= Trade Tower =

Office skyscraper in Seoul, South Korea

Coordinates: 37°30′37.26″N 127°03′39.77″E

- 트레이드타워
- Interactive map of the Trade Tower area

General information
- Status: Completed
- Type: Office building
- Location: 511, Yeongdong-daero, Gangnam-gu, Seoul, South Korea
- Owner: KITA

Height
- Height: 228 m (748 ft)

Technical details
- Floor count: 55
- Floor area: 107,933m^{2}

Design and construction
- Architect: Nikken Sekkei
- Main contractor: Kukdong E&C

Website
- www.wtcseoul.com

The Trade Tower (Korean: 트레이드타워) in Gangnam district, Seoul, is one of South Korea's tallest buildings, part of the World Trade Center Seoul. The 55-floor Trade Tower high-rise was built in 1988 and stands at 748 feet (228 m). It resembles two quadro-level towers in mirror image of each other. It is part of the COEX complex. Its 52nd floor hosts a restaurant.

== Pop culture ==
Thirty-one seconds into the Gangnam Style music video, the Tower can be seen in the background while Psy is doing his horse-riding dance on the top of ASEM Tower. It can be seen again from far away 1:28 into the video.

== See also ==
- List of tallest buildings in Seoul
- List of tallest buildings in South Korea
