= TradeKorea =

South Korean trading platform

tradeKorea
- Founded: 2008; 18 years ago
- Headquarters: Gangnam District, Seoul, Korea
- Key people: Young-ju Kim, CEO
- Parent: Korea International Trade Association
- Website: www.tradekorea.com

tradeKorea is Korea-based online B2B platform for global trade. It is operated by KITA (Korea International Trade Association), the largest business organization in Korea and which runs World Trade Center Seoul.

== History ==
tradeKorea launched in April 2008 to strengthen overseas marketing efforts at small and midsize exporters. It is owned and operated by KITA (Korea International Trade Association) where global buyers and suppliers feel free to connect with Korean companies for their business needs.

== See also ==
- B2B
- Korea International Trade Association
- ecommerce
