= World Trade Center Seoul =

Complex in Gangnam, Seoul, South Korea

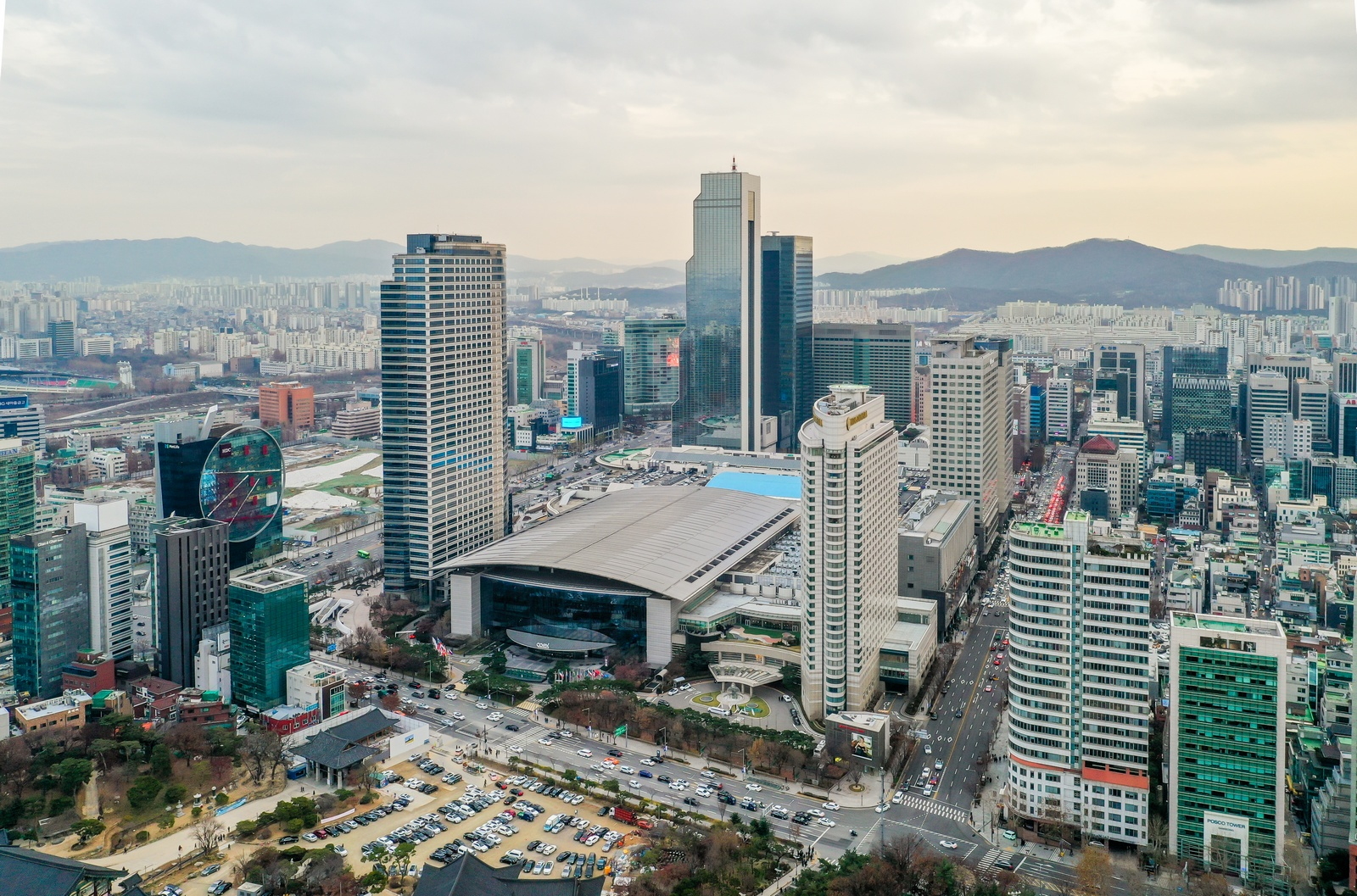
- WTC Seoul in 2019
- Interactive map of the World Trade Center Seoul area

General information
- Location: Gangnam-gu, Seoul
- Coordinates: 37°30′37.08″N 127°3′39.6″E
- Owner: Korea International Trade Association

Other information
- Public transit: Samseong; Bongeunsa

Website
- wtcseoul.org

Korean name
- Hangul: 한국종합무역센터
- Hanja: 韓國綜合貿易센터
- RR: Hanguk jonghap muyeok senteo
- MR: Han'guk chonghap muyŏk sent'ŏ

World Trade Center Seoul (WTC Seoul; Korean: 한국종합무역센터) is a building complex centered on the COEX Convention & Exhibition Center (Coex) on Teheranno in Samseong-dong, Gangnam-gu district of Seoul. It is operated by Korea International Trade Association.

== Notable Facilities ==
- COEX
- Trade Tower
- COEX Mall - underground shopping center
- COEX Aquarium
- ASEM Tower
- Korea City Air Terminal
- Hyundai Department Store

== In popular culture ==
- The interior of the penthouse of the Oakwood Premier COEX Center was used as a filming location for the Paris home, in the first three episode, of male lead, Han Ki-joo played by Park Shin-yang, in Seoul Broadcasting System (SBS)'s drama Lovers in Paris.
- Legally Blonde, The Musical: 16 November 2012 to 17 March 2013, CoexArtium, starring Jung Eun-ji of A Pink.

== Administration ==
The 836-meter (914-yard) section of sidewalk along Yeongdong Boulevard from exit No.5 of Samseong Station on Seoul Subway Line 2, outside Convention & Exhibition Center and ASEM Tower is designated as a smoke-free zone by the Seoul Metropolitan Government.

== See also ==
- World Trade Center
