= Starfield COEX Mall =

Shopping mall in Seoul, South Korea

- 스타필드 코엑스몰
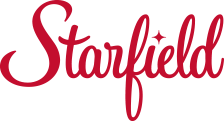

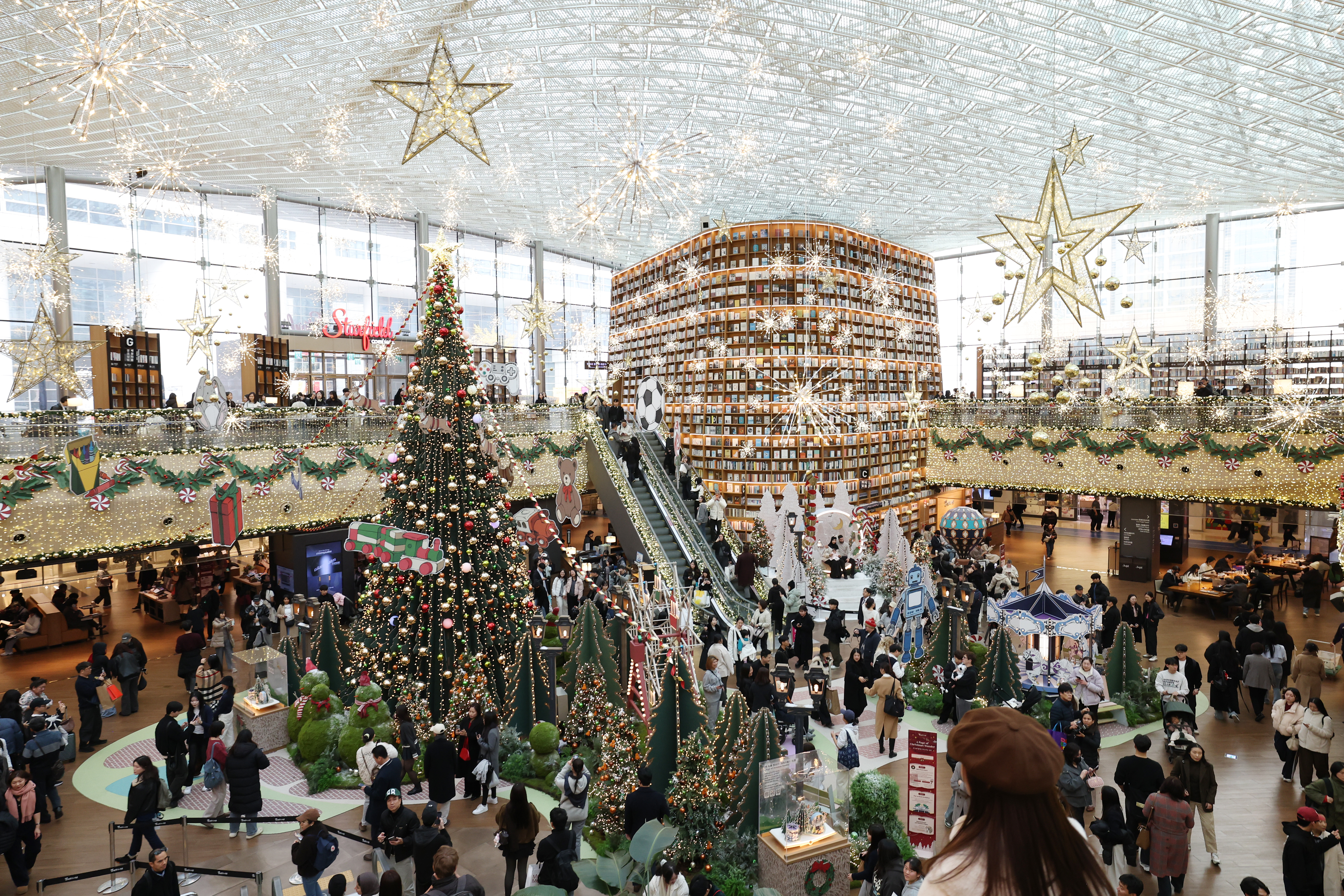
- The Byeolmadang Library (별마당도서관) inside the mall (2018)
- Location: Seoul
- Coordinates: 37°30′43″N 127°3′32″E
- Address: 513, Yeongdong-daero, Gangnam-gu, Seoul
- Previous names: COEX Mall
- Developer: KITA
- Manager: Shinsegae
- Owner: KITA
- Public transit: Samseong; Bongeunsa
- Website: www.starfield.co.kr/coexmall

Starfield COEX Mall (Korean: 스타필드 코엑스몰; formerly known as COEX Mall) is an underground shopping mall in Samseong-dong, Gangnam-gu Seoul, South Korea. The name "COEX" is derived from "COnvention centers" and "EXhibition halls".

The mall is located at the intersection of Teheranno and Yeongdong Dae-ro, near Samseong station on Seoul Subway Line 2 and Bongeunsa station on Seoul Subway Line 9. The COEX Mall is adjacent to the COEX Convention & Exhibition Center, which is part of the COEX complex, run by the Korea International Trade Association (KITA). Millennium Square is the main exit of COEX Mall connecting with Line 2's Samseong Station.

It has an area of about 154,000 square metres (1,660,000 sq ft), of which 144,000 square metres (1,550,000 sq ft) are on a single underground floor, making it the world's largest underground shopping mall. Along with hundreds of shops, the mall houses two food courts, MegaBox (cinema), COEX Aquarium and a large bookstore, but the Kimchi Fields Museum has moved to Insadong. It features a game area that is used to film computer game tournaments, which are broadcast on local television. There are stages inside and outside the mall for seasonal events and public appearances by celebrities. It is open year-round from 10:30 AM to 10:00 PM and admission is free.

== History ==
The mall was originally developed by investments from the Korea International Trade Association. COEX Mall was designed by the US interior design company RTKL. COEX Mall was also designed by Gensler, under the theme "Unfolding Sky", emphasizing seamless flow and openness. Construction of the mall began in May 1997 and finished in April 2000. Construction costs amounted to ₩140 billion (US$150 million).

In May 2012, KITA (Korea International Trade Association) announced major renovation plans for the mall. It will spend ₩180 billion to the upgrade project. The renovation is needed to create passenger walkways between the new Bongeunsa Station on Seoul Subway Line 9, due for completion in 2014, with Samseong Station on Line 2. It was scheduled to start at the end of 2012 and complete by November 2014. The floor space is expected to increased to 173,025 square metres (206,936 square yards) from its current 152,116 square metres (181,929 square yards). The COEX complex renovation was completed on 27 November 2014.

== Location ==
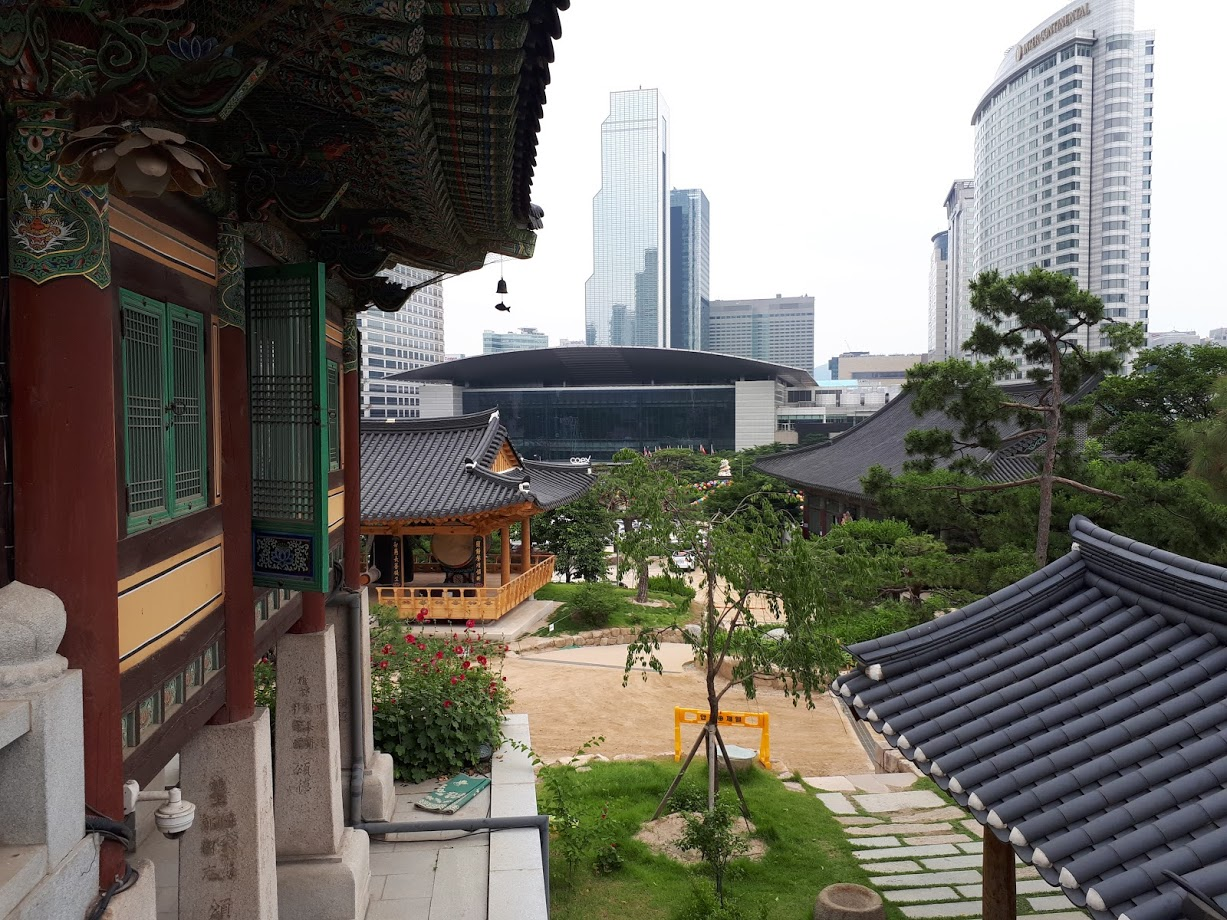
View of the COEX from the nearby Bongeunsa Temple

The COEX Mall is located at Seoul Gangnam-gu Yeongdong-daero 513(Samseong dong). This mall is connected the Samseong station on Seoul Subway Line 2 and Bongeunsa station on Seoul Subway Line 9. Cheongdam station on Seoul Subway Line 7 is next to COEX Mall, as is World Trade Center Seoul.

== Venues ==
COEX Mall Central Plaza Atrium in 2016, it changed to Starfield Library in 2017

COEX Mall Live Plaza

SMTOWN COEX Artium

=== Plazas ===
The mall features five plazas: the Central Plaza, Live Plaza, Millennium Plaza, Asem Plaza, and Airport Plaza.

=== Starfield Library (Byeolmadang Doseogwan) ===
The library has 50,000 books, 600 magazines, and offers e-books. In addition, it serves as an event center, intended to host talk shows with authors, lectures with intellectuals and personalities, and concerts. Contrary to popular belief, not all the books on display are real. Books on higher shelves or on shelves that cannot be reached are decorative.

The library featured in the series Record of Youth (2020) starring Park Bo-gum and garnered increased attention from viewers.

== Gallery ==
Asem Plaza

Central Plaza Access

Airport Plaza Restaurants

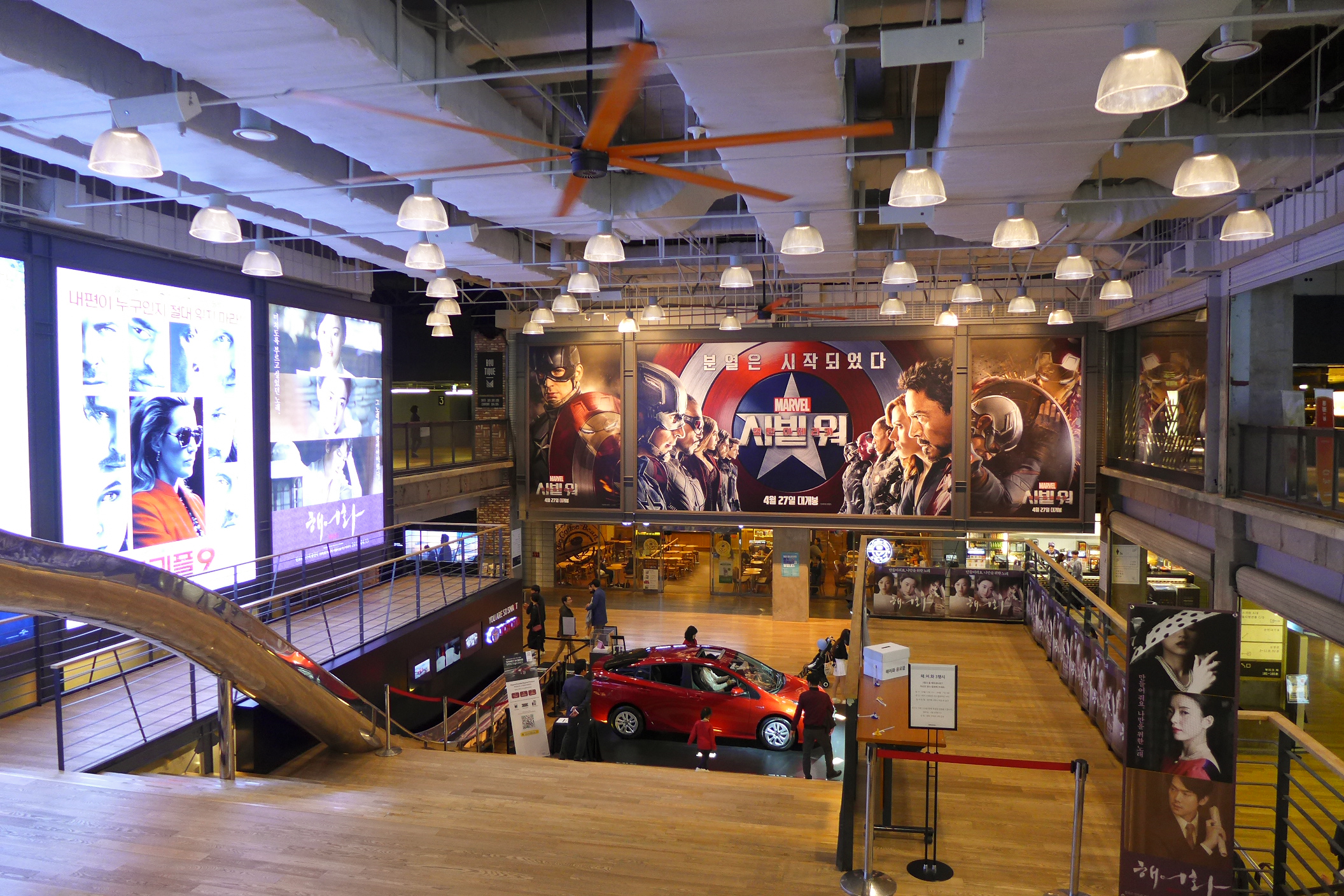
Megabox Cinema

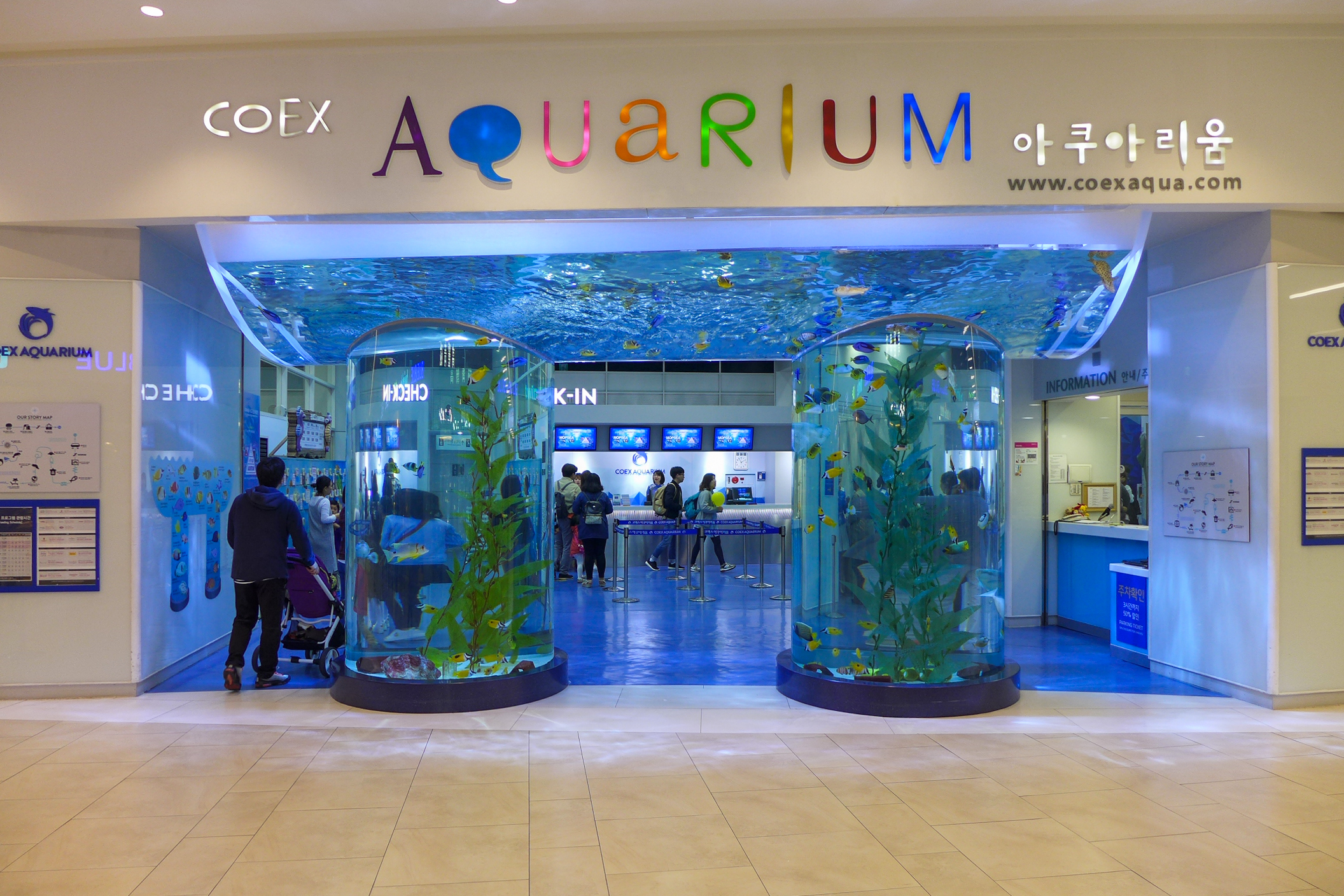
COEX Aquarium

2nd floor of Byeolmadang library

== See also ==
- Contemporary culture of South Korea
