= Trade day in South Korea =

South Korean holiday (December 5)

Trade Day is observed on December 5. It is a commemorative day in South Korea hosted by the Korea International Trade Association and organized by the Ministry of Trade, Industry, and Energy of South Korea. It features events aimed at reaffirming the country's commitment to trade and promoting balanced trade development.

== History ==
The day was originally designated as Export Day to commemorate November 30, 1964, when South Korea achieved $100 million in exports for the first time. In 1990, it was renamed Trade Day, and until 2011, it was still celebrated on November 30.

On December 5, 2011, South Korea became the 9th country in the world to achieve $1 trillion in trade volume. As a result, from 2012 onward, the date was changed to December 5 to mark this significant milestone.
