= Teheran-ro =

Street in Seoul, South Korea

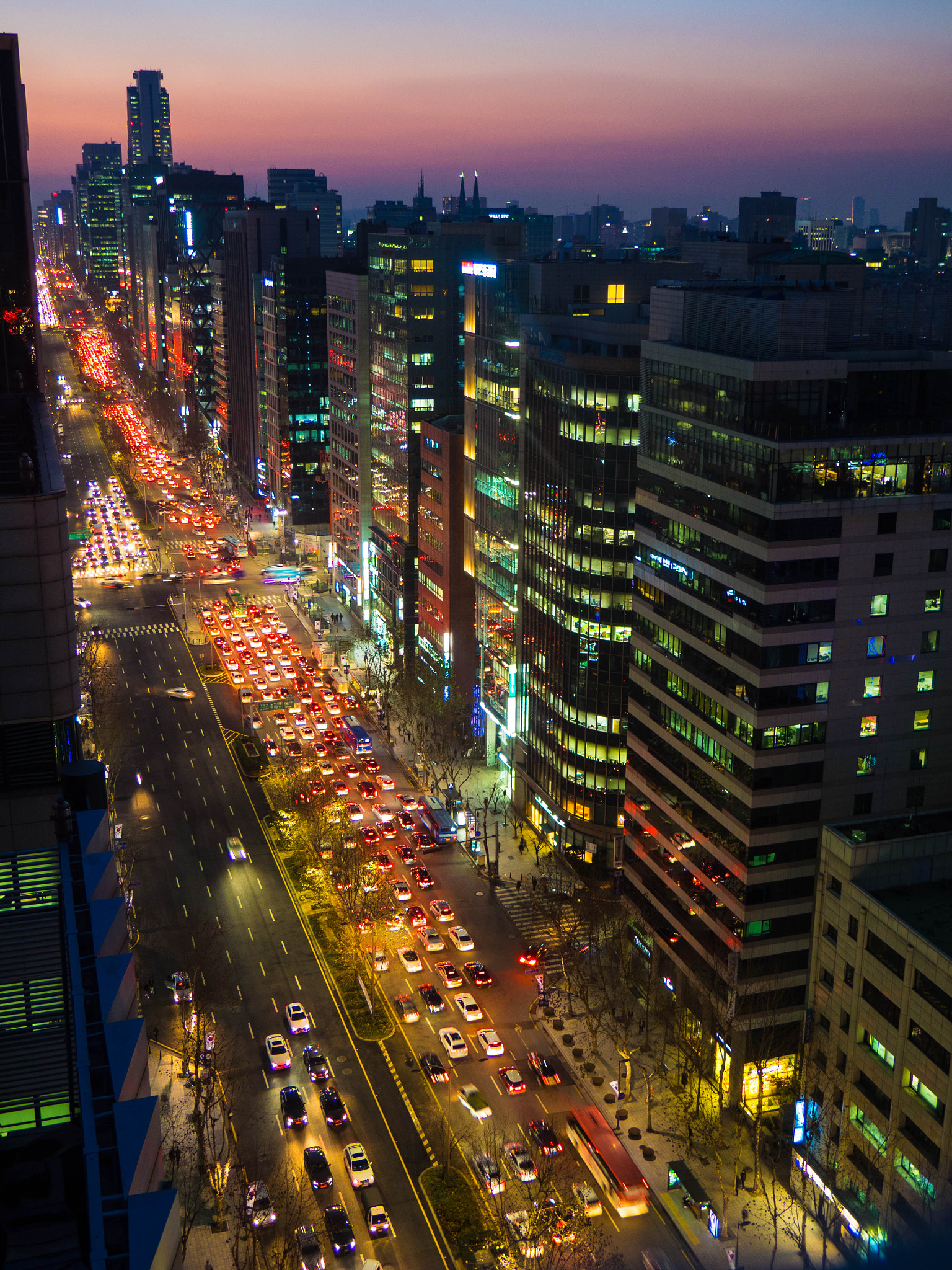

Korean name
- Hangul: 테헤란로
- Hanja: 테헤란路
- RR: Teheran-ro
- MR: T'eheran-ro

Teheran-ro (Korean: 테헤란로; named for Tehran, Iran) is a street in the Gangnam district of Seoul, South Korea. It runs from Gangnam Station through Yeoksam-dong and into Samseong-dong. It is colloquially known as "Teheran Valley" (after Silicon Valley) due to the number of internet-related companies operating there. The district of Gangnam-gu experienced phenomenal growth and waves of construction, with Teheran-ro becoming one of the busiest streets in South Korea. Its counterpart, Seoul St. in Tehran, Iran, runs in the north of that city, close to the Evin district.

Teheran-ro is a 3.5 km section of Seoul City Route 90, and runs eastwards from Gangnam Station to Samseong Station and the COEX/KWTC complex. Yeoksam and Seolleung stations are also on Teheran-ro. All stations are on Seoul Subway Line 2.

Some of South Korea's tallest skyscrapers and most expensive real estate are in Teheran-ro, while Seoul Metropolitan Government estimates that more than half of South Korea's venture capital, some 200 billion won (approximately $200 million), is invested in Teheran Valley.

== Name ==
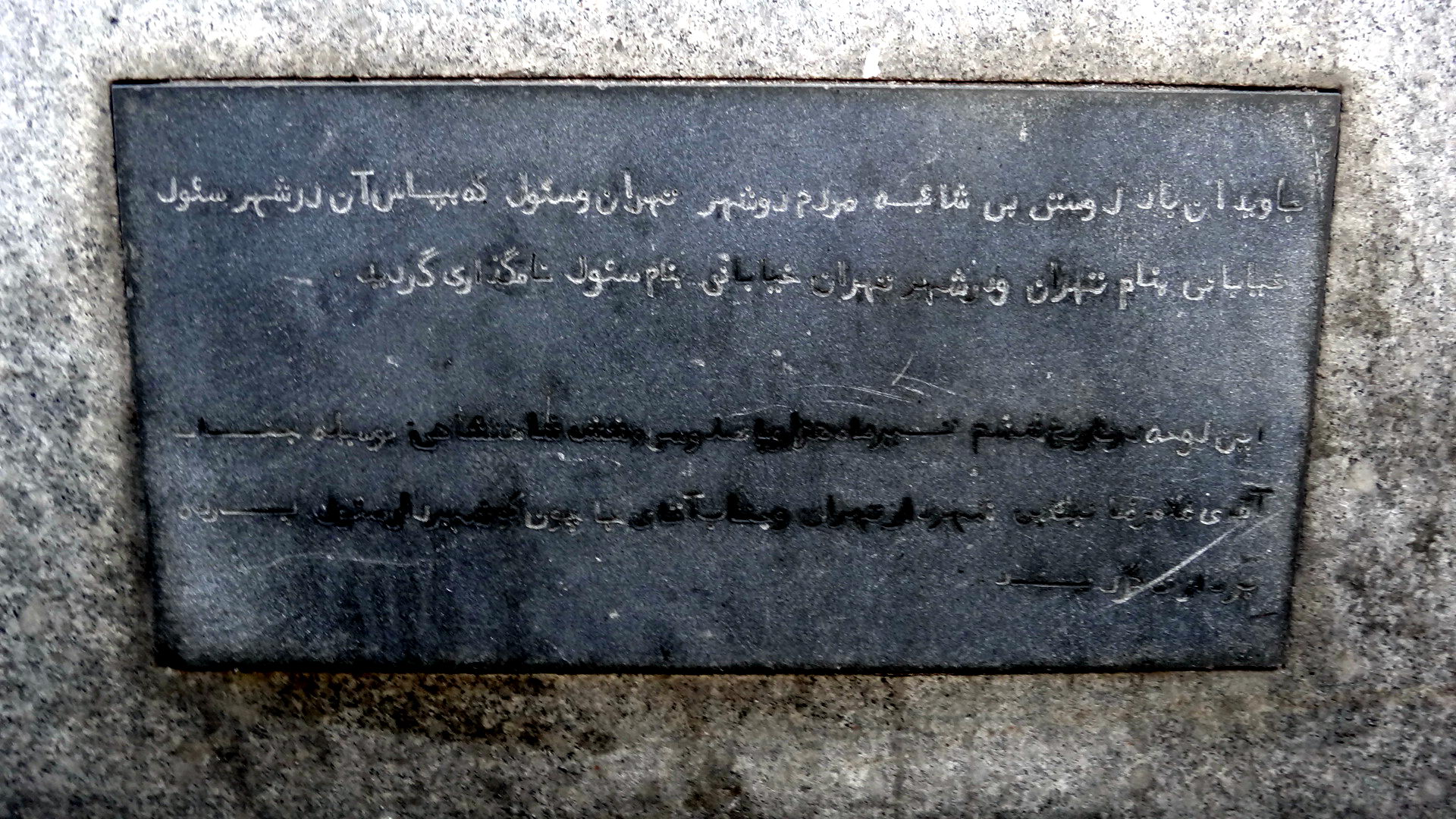
The tablet of commemorating the visit by Gholamreza Nikpey, Tehran's mayor, to Kuh Cha-chun, Seoul's mayor

On 27 June 1977, the Seoul Metropolitan Government suggested that the cities of Seoul (the capital of South Korea) and Tehran (the capital of then Imperial State of Iran) exchange street names on the occasion of the visit to South Korea of Gholamreza Nikpey, the Mayor of Tehran. The following year, Samneungno street was renamed Teheran-ro, which then ran through a relatively underdeveloped area that had been annexed into Seoul in 1963.

== Economy ==
The area hosts major domestic internet portals Daum and Naver as well as Google. Samsung Electronics and Hynix both operate offices there. Various South Korean and international financial and business institutions including POSCO, Standard Chartered and Citibank also maintain offices there.

Jungsuck Building, the headquarters of Kakao M (now Kakao Entertainment), one of the largest music companies in the country, is located in Teheran-ro.

The explosive growth of Teheran-ro is discussed by the architect and researcher Sun-Young Rieh in her Korean-language book Boom or Bust?: The future of Teheran-ro after the Gangnam Building Boom. The work analyzes aspects of urban planning related to sustainability, especially as regards energy regulations.

== Photo gallery ==
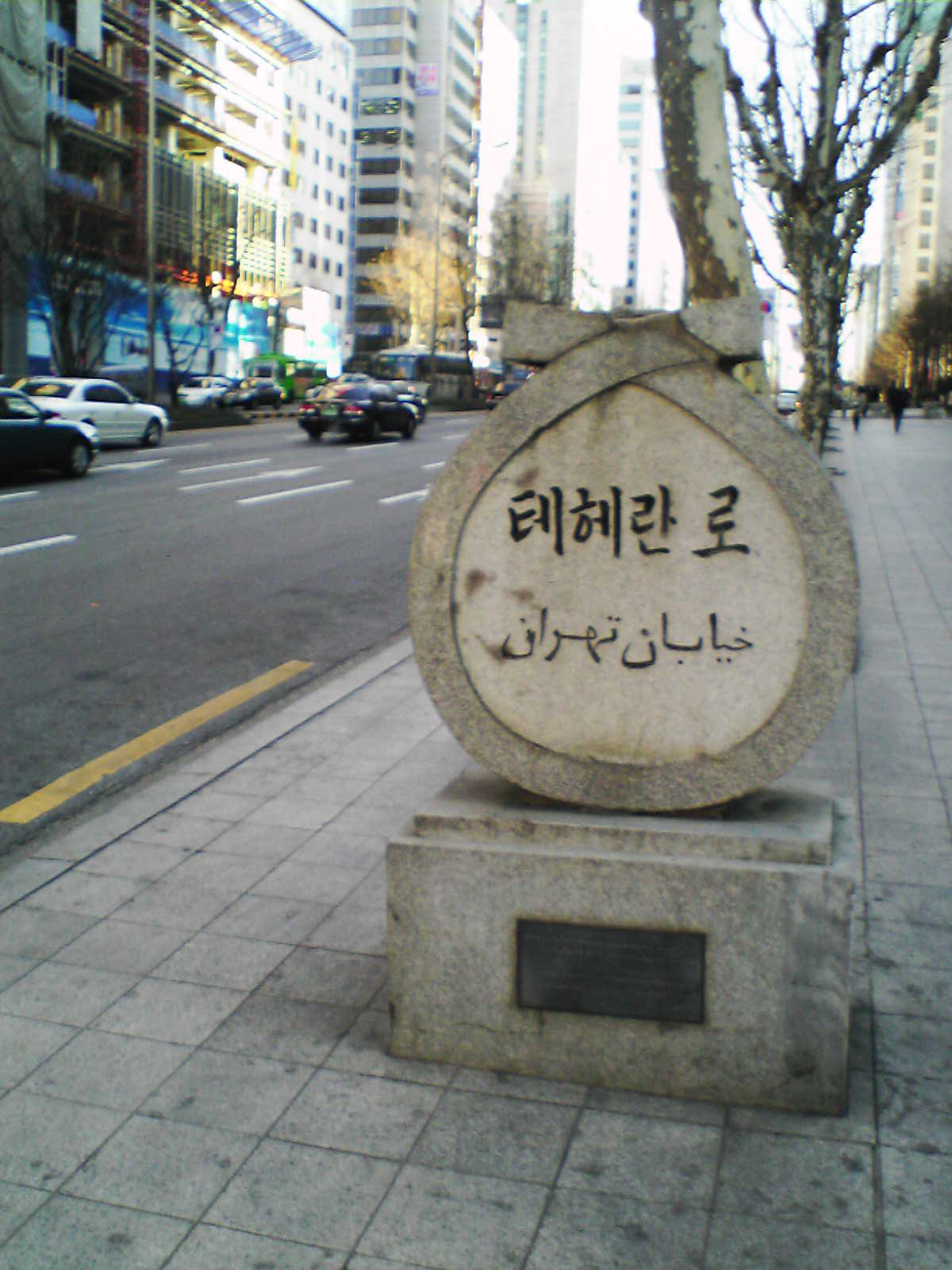
Road post that says "Tehran Road" both in Korean hangul (테헤란로) and Persian (خیابان تهران).

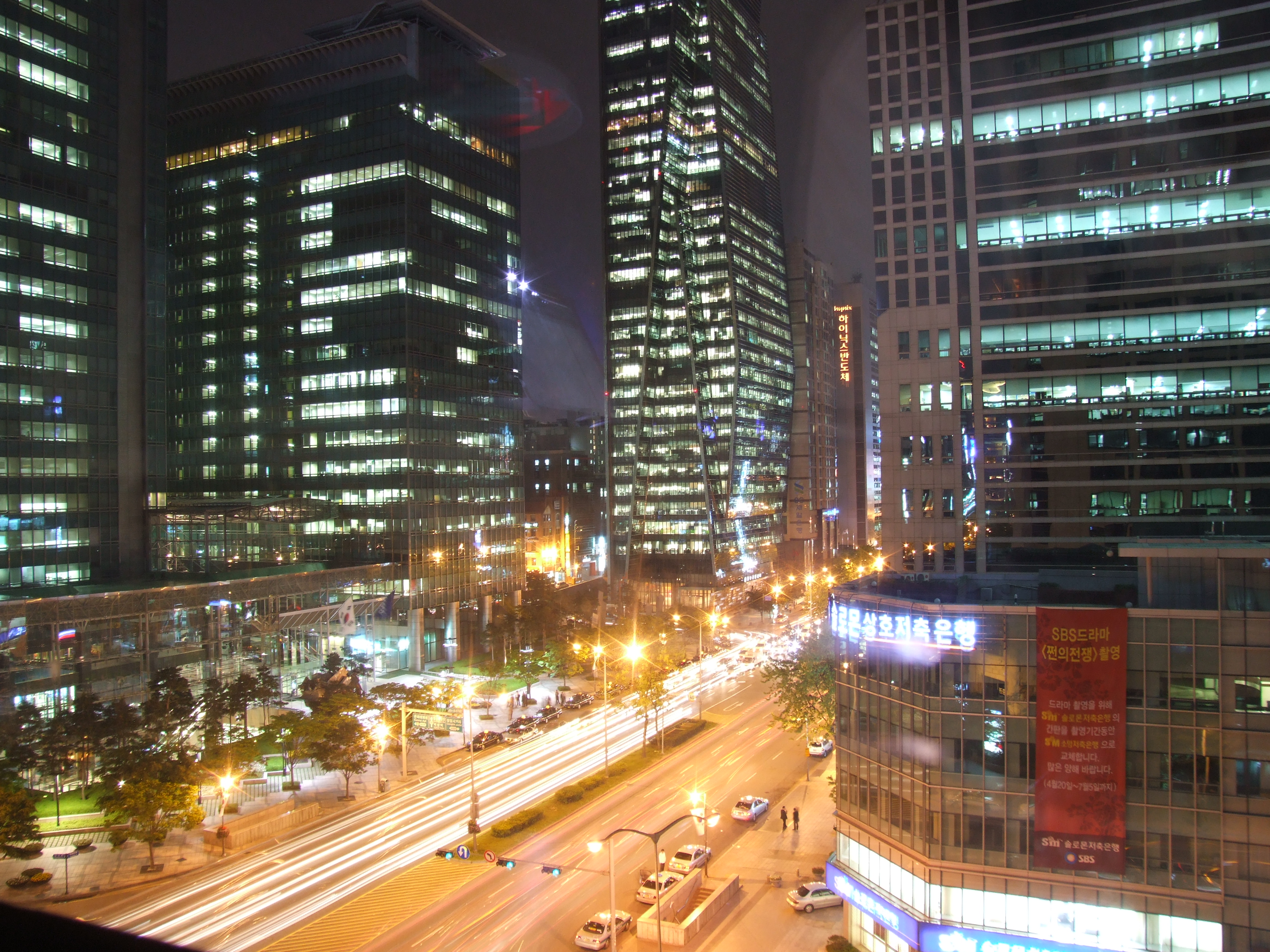
Posco intersection

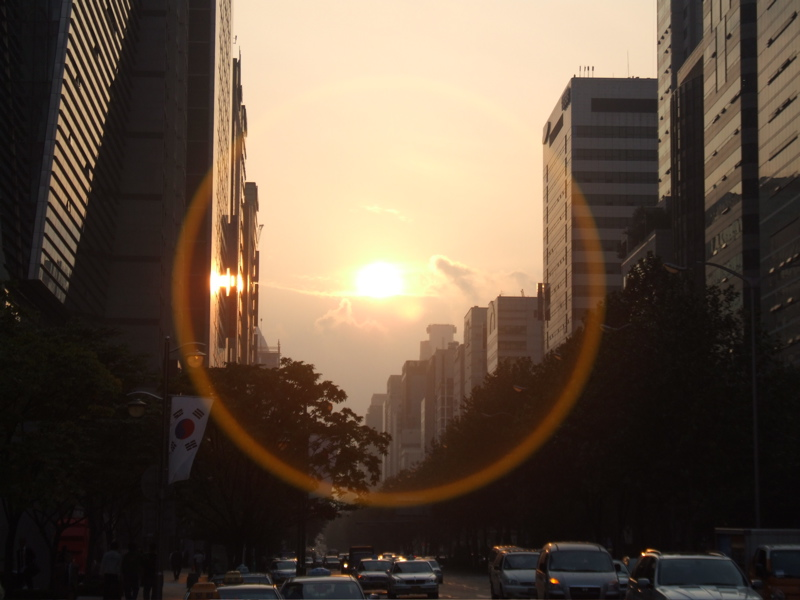
Posco sunset

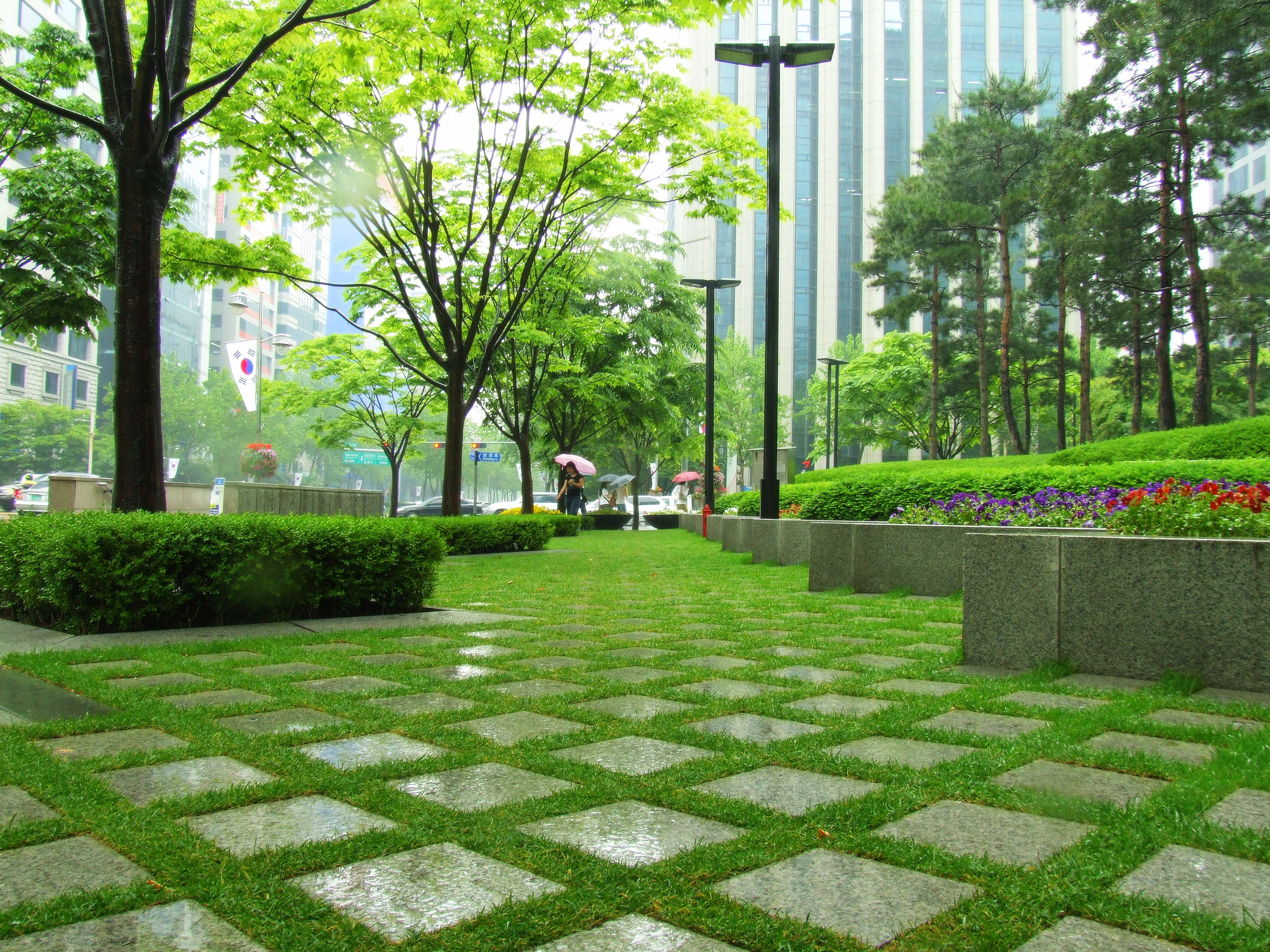
A small walkway on a rainy day, in front of the Posco building

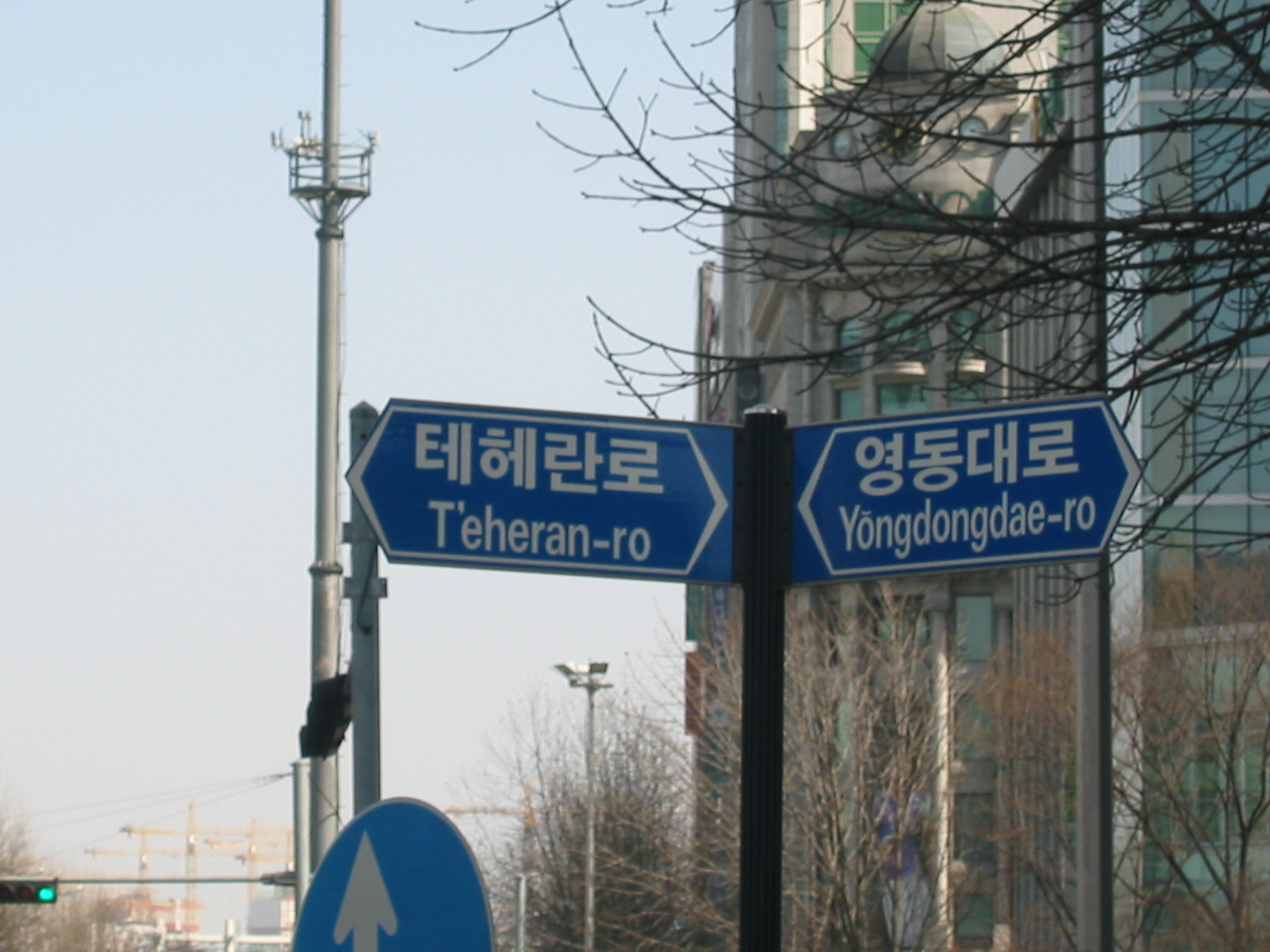
Roadsign, COEX-KWTC intersection

== See also ==
- Seoul Street
