= Korea International Trade Association =

- 한국무역협회
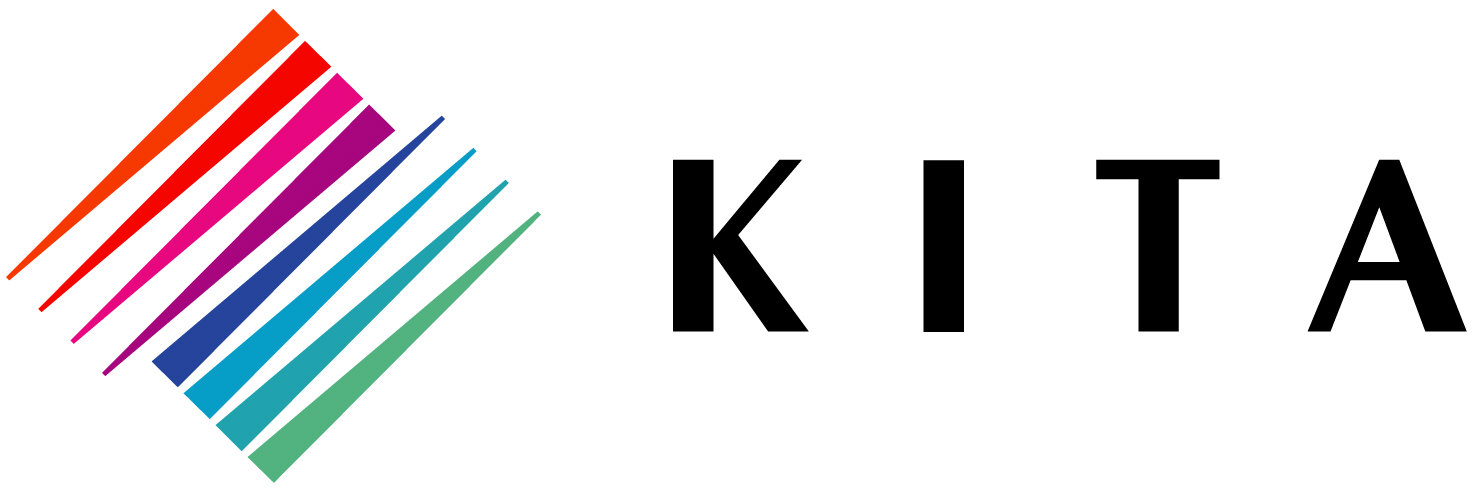
- Founded: July 1946
- Type: Nonprofit
- Purpose: Trade association
- Headquarters: Gangnam-gu, Seoul, South Korea
- Website: www.kita.net (in Korean) www.kita.org (in English)

The Korea International Trade Association (KITA; Korean: 한국무역협회; Hanja: 韓國貿易協會) is a private non-profit trade organization founded in 1946 with 105 traders as its founding members.

KITA runs the World Trade Center Seoul (WTCS), commonly known as COEX, which includes two large office complexes, the Trade Tower and ASEM Tower. The WTCS has a number of subsidiaries and affiliates, including the COEX Convention & Exhibition Center and COEX Mall. KITA owns KTNET (Korea Trade Network) which is the National Paperless Trade Platform or Single Window (uTradeHub) operator and e-commerce infrastructure (such as Certificate of Authority issuing Digital Certificate)-related service provider.

In May 2012, KITA announced major renovation plans for the COEX Mall. It will spend ₩180 billion to the upgrade project. The renovation was needed to create passenger walkways between the new COEX Station on Seoul Subway Line 9, due for completion in 2014, with Samseong Station on Line 2. It was scheduled to start at the end of 2012 and be completed by November 2014. The floor space was expected to increased to 173,025 square meters from the current 152,116 square meters.

On April 16, 2025, the Korea International Trade Association held the 'Trade Industry Meeting Invited by Governor Wes Moore of Maryland, USA' at the Grand Intercontinental Hotel in Samseong-dong.

== Main activities ==
- Trade policy recommendation & trade consulting

== History ==
=== Since 2000 ===
- 2016 Jan.: Chengdu Center established
- 2015 Jan.: Jakarta Center established
- 2014 Jun.: Kmall24 service opened
- 2014 Jan.: New Delhi Center established
- 2011 Sep.: Ho Chi Minh Center established
- 2011 Apr.: Jeju Center established
- 2010 Nov.: Hosted G20 Seoul Summit
- 2009 Apr.: COEX Artium established
- 2008 Apr.: tradeKorea service opened
- 2006 Jul.: Announced “The New KITA Strategy” for KITA’s 60th anniversary
- 2006 Feb.: Singapore Center established
- 2006 Feb.: Washington Center established
- 2005 Feb.: Korea Paperless Trade Center established
- 2005 Feb.: Korea International Logistics Council established
- 2002 Jun.: Shanghai Center established
- 2000 Oct.: Hosted the 3rd Asia-Europe Meeting (ASEM)
- 2000 May.: Extension of World Trade Center Seoul completed

=== From 1946 to 1999 ===
- 1995 Oct.: Gwangju Trade Tower opened
- 1995 Apr.: Gyeongnam Trade Tower opened
- 1992 Aug.: Beijing Center established
- 1991 Dec.: KTNet established
- 1988 Sep.: Construction of WTC Seoul completed
- 1986 Jun.: Busan Trade Tower established
- 1984 May.: Brussels Center established
- 1984 Feb.: World Trade Academy opened
- 1978 Aug.: COEX established
- 1974 Aug.: New York Hankook Center (U.S.A) Inc. founded
- 1972 Jan.: Joined WTCA (World Trade Centers Association)
- 1967 Jan.: New York Center established
- 1948 Apr.: Tokyo Center established
- 1946 Jul.: KITA founded
