= Sun-Young Rieh =

South Korean architect

Sun-Young Rieh (Korean: 이선영) is a Korean architect known for her writing and teachings on educational environments, sustainable architecture, and gender-conscious environments. As she is well versed in both practice and academia, her research strives to integrate with architectural design, particularly in the area of eco-friendly and human-friendly design.^{[1]} She is a professor in the Department of Architecture at the University of Seoul, and has previously been awarded a Fulbright Visiting Scholar grant. She is also a registered architect in both Korea and the United States (NCARB), and she works as a public architect for the City of Seoul. She has served as a board member on multiple key councils for more than a decade, including the Korean Institute of Architects, the Architectural Institute of Korea, the Korea Green Building Council, and the Korea Institute of Female Architects.

== Educational Background ==
Rieh studied architecture in Korea and in the United States, earning a Bachelor of Engineering and subsequently a Master of Engineering from Seoul National University's College of Engineering, a Masters of Architecture from UC Berkeley's College of Environmental Design, and a Doctor of Architecture from The University of Hawaii's School of Architecture.

Of her experience studying architecture in Korea in the mid-1980s, Rieh admits that she had to ‘’struggle alone as one of the few female students, acknowledging that she had to “design in a highly masculine way out of desperation to survive.” Her difficult experience has borne out a willingness to discuss gender realities that has marked her practice, teaching, and research.

== Architectural Career and Design Research ==
Rieh began her architectural career working in a number of firms. She started her design work in 1987 at Junglim Architecture in Seoul; she subsequently moved onto I.M. Pei and Associates in New York; Woo and Williams (later to become Kyu Sung Woo Architects) in Cambridge, Massachusetts; Bruner/Cott and Associates in Cambridge; Lake Flato in San Antonio, and Marmon Mok in San Antonio. Additionally, she worked as a public architect for the City of Seoul from 2013 to 2019.

She pivoted from focusing on architectural practice to architectural research in the mid-1990s, and began a professorial path, first as an assistant professor at the School of Architecture at Prairie View A&W University, then as an assistant professor at University of Seoul, followed by a year as a Fulbright Visiting professor at the School of Architecture at the University of Hawaii, and finally as a tenured professor at the University of Seoul, where she has taught since 2005. In 2017, she also taught at the Delft University of Technology as a visiting professor. In her position as the University of Seoul, she has taught architectural design studios, seminars on sustainable architecture and environmental design, and seminars on architecture and a sense of place. She acknowledges that she was initially appointed as a professor due to a Seoul municipal quota policy to increase the low proportion of female professors at the University of Seoul; yet she celebrates that women in Korea are now “considered as people who can realize universality,” with “women” now being used in a positive sense.

=== Educational Environments ===
One of the central points of Rieh's teaching, research, and practice has been her design theories of place attachment, as put forth in her book Creating a Sense of Place in School Environments: How Young Children Construct Place Attachment. Through the work integrating built and landscape environments with behavioral psychology, she unpacks how the architectural and landscape design of schools is inextricably linked to the formation of place in children, acknowledging that schools are one of the least investigated places in society in terms of place attachment and developmental psychology. She articulates the importance of place for cognitive development, and suggests design elements that should be considered:

…Children’s place attachment is a precondition for cognitive development. The environment in which children’s lives are organized influences the personal schema that enables them to respond to the world. Such childhood memory imprints not only affect life quality, but also frame identity and enduring traits of adult world view. The childhood school environment therefore needs special attention with respect to sense of place…If architects want to create schools that help child development and heighten quality of life in the form of assisting the formation of lasting cherished childhood memories, they need to pay special attention to aesthetically satisfactory design…[including elements of design at areas representing] boundaries, centers, and paths…[as well as] functional diversity, privacy, thermal comfort, articulated outdoor space and children’s participation in the design and/ or construction of the school setting.

Rieh has sought to put into practice these considerations of place-shaping school design through her work with the Korean Educational Development Institute (KEDI) in brainstorming and crafting a new prototype school. The process invited users to participate in the design phase through a series of workshops involving both teachers and students, representing the first time in Korea that users have been consulted on issues relating to school design. Design charettes involved participants compiling a collective wish list, proposing designs for a given space, and giving feedback to architectural concept drawings. The result was an encouraging collaboration among students, as well as between students and staff, to imagine a variety of gathering spaces that could nurture a school's unique community culture.

At the core of such a collaborative design process is the hope that schools can serve as community nodes for neighbourhoods. For Rieh, schools have the potential to serve as special places cultivating social infrastructure—whether as a multigenerational meeting place, a space for community gardening, or a shelter in emergency times. In providing a place of connection that meets the public's changing needs, schools have an opportunity (in addition to the standard purpose of cultivating youth) to work for all of society's benefit.

=== Sustainable Architecture ===
Rieh's work with schools has focused on good design not only in terms of place attachment but also in terms of sustainability. She affirms that, in the design of schools, the integration of eco-friendliness with environmental can benefit children's emotional development. Her research, coupled with her architectural-practice background have, for instance, led to specific suggestions for sustainably renovating the standard school plan of 1980s Korea: increasing natural lighting, increasing ventilation, improving thermal performance, etc.

Sustainable architecture and environmental design have comprised a critical part of Rieh's research in general. She considers it vital to employ simulation tools to analyze energy usage, reducing energy consumption for lighting, ventilation, and heating and cooling loads throughout the life of a building, thus minimizing waste and recycle. Yet, for Rieh, such tools and any kind of performance-focused certification are not enough: they must be partnered with qualitative research based on environmental psychology. These perspectives are exemplified in her Korean-language book Boom or Bust?: The future of Teheran-ro after the Gangnam Building Boom that discusses the Teheran-ro blocks of Seoul's Gangnam area, analyzing aspects of urban planning related to sustainability in the realm of energy regulations.

All this is part of a pursuit of architecture that synthesizes eco-friendly and human-friendly design. This is an architecture for social benefit, and, according to Rieh, architects who create eco-friendly and human-friendly environments will find “everything to be precious.”

== Additional Publications ==
- "A Study on Elementary Schools as Community-Friendly Public Infrastructure Facilities for Aging Society: Focusing on Acceptance of Facilities for the Elderly" (National Research Foundation of Korea), 2019–2022
- "A Study on Changes in School Learning Environment and Student Life Adaptation" (University of Seoul), 2018
- "Development of Guidelines for the Eco-Friendly Renovation of Campus Buildings at the University of Seoul" (Seoul Metropolitan City/University of Seoul), 2013–2014
- "The Aspects of Favorite Place in Urban Mini Schools" (Journal of the Architectural Institute of Korea), April 2011
- "How to Build a Women-Friendly City" (World Women's Forum), 2008
- "An Analysis of Outdoor Space in Elementary School Design Based on the Possibility of Forming a Sense of Place for Children" (Journal of Korean Institute of Educational Facilities), September 2008.
- "Restructuring Architectural Education in Korea - With focus on Curriculum" (International Forum on Architectural Education) December 2003.
- "Aspects of Collaboration between Domestic and Foreign Architecture Firms in Korea" (Journal of the Architectural Institute of Korea), October 1999.
- "A Study on the Curriculum in Architectural Education in the U.S.A" (Journal of the Architectural Institute of Korea), October 1999
- "A Critical Analysis on the Architectural Education in Korea from the view of International Accrediting Criteria" (Journal of Korean Association of Architectural History), March 1999
