= Gaepo-dong station =

Metro station in Seoul, South Korea

Coordinates: 37°29′20″N 127°03′58″E

개포동; Gaepo-dong
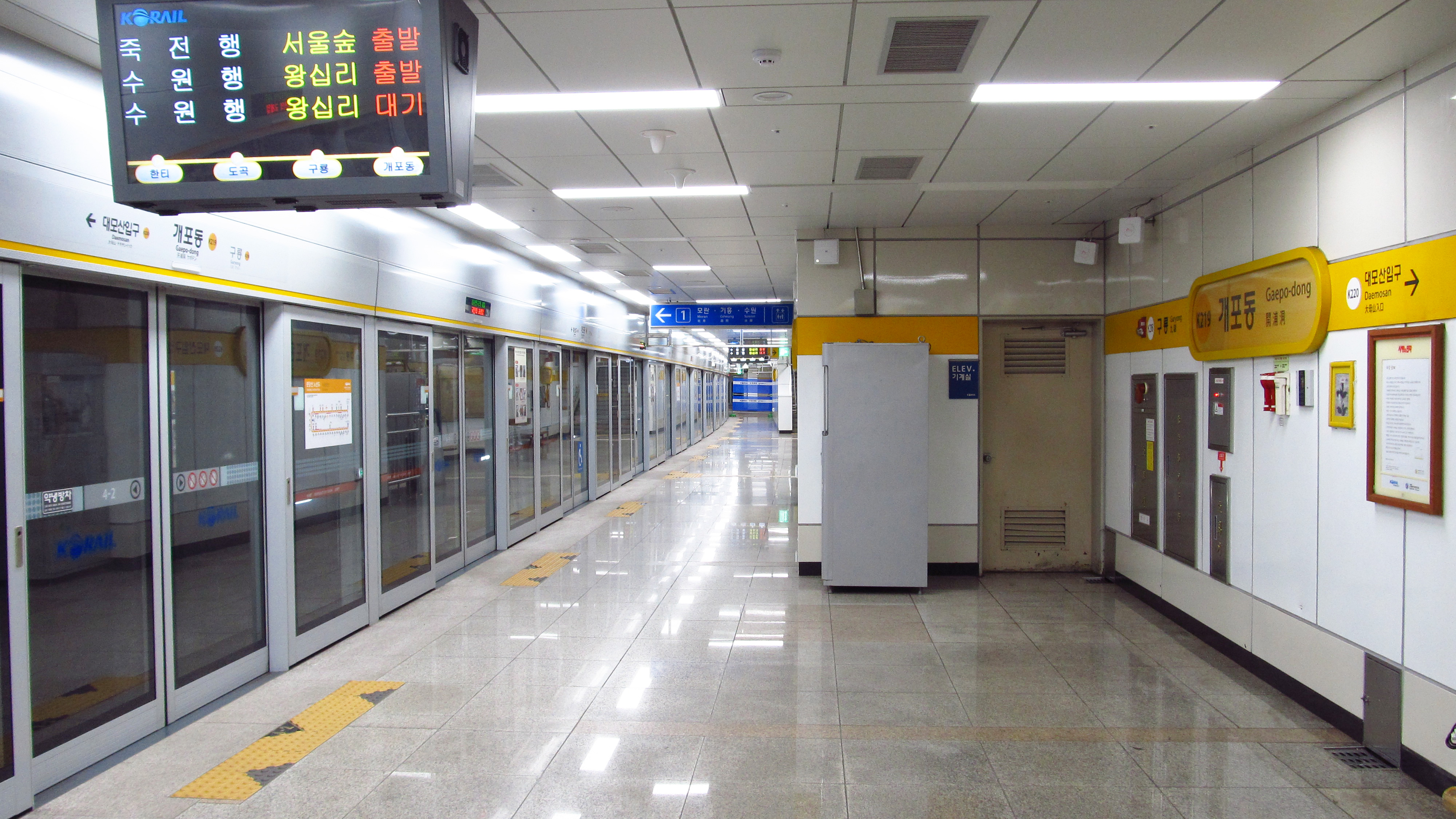

Korean name
- Hangul: 개포동역
- Hanja: 開浦洞驛
- Revised Romanization: Gaepodong-yeok
- McCune–Reischauer: Kaep'odong-yŏk

General information
- Location: 195 Gaepo-dong, 420 Gaeporo, Gangnam-gu, Seoul
- Operator: Korail
- Line: Suin–Bundang Line
- Platforms: 2
- Tracks: 2

Construction
- Structure type: Underground

Key dates
- September 3, 2003: Suin–Bundang Line opened
Location

Gaepo-dong Station (Korean: 개포동역) is a station on the Suin–Bundang Line, a commuter rail line of Korail.

Preceding station	Seoul Metropolitan Subway	Following station
Guryong towards Cheongnyangni	Suin–Bundang Line	Daemosan towards Incheon
