= ASEM Tower =

Office building located in Samseong-dong, Gangnam district, Seoul

Coordinates: 37.5130°N 127.0599°E

- Interactive map of the ASEM Tower area

General information
- Status: Completed
- Location: Seoul
- Completed: 2000

Height
- Height: 176.5 m (579 ft)

Technical details
- Floor count: 42 (+4 below-grade)
- Floor area: 91,315 m^{2} (982,910 sq ft)
- Lifts/elevators: 31

Design and construction
- Architect: Skidmore, Owings & Merrill LLP

ASEM Tower is an office building located in Samseong-dong, Gangnam District, Seoul, South Korea. It was constructed for the 3rd Asia–Europe Meeting (ASEM 3) in 2000.

The 836-meter (914-yard) section of sidewalk along Yeongdong Boulevard from exit No. 5 of Samseong Station on Seoul Subway Line 2, outside the COEX Convention & Exhibition Center and ASEM Tower, is designated as a smoke-free zone by the Seoul Metropolitan Government.

== History ==
Construction began in 1997, with a planned period of about three years. Construction was headed by Daewoo Engineering & Construction, Samsung C&T and Hyundai Engineering & Construction.

On 1 January 2000, the Millennium Festival selected it as one of the "buildings symbolizing the new millennium" and held an event to turn on the entire building's lights on the arrival of the new year. It was opened in August 2000 at the time of the third Asia–Europe Meeting (ASEM) and approved for use on 13 March 2002.

In 2012, a Korean Wikipedia event was held to celebrate the 10th anniversary.

== Facility ==
Most of the buildings consist of offices, and there are Ashem Tower on the 11th, 18th and 33rd floors, Pivotpoint Business Center on the 30th and 37th floors, and Machine Room on the 41st floors and other office facilities.

== Characteristics ==
The building is 176 meters tall, similar to the height of 2IFC located in Yeouido, and has the Ashem Tower, except for 101-dong and 102-dong of Samsung-dong I'Park. Tower Palace has been the tallest tower since 2004, and besides, skyscrapers and skyscrapers weighing more than 200 meters are higher than the buildings.

== In popular culture ==
Thirty-one seconds into the "Gangnam Style" music video, the Tower is the location where Psy is doing his horse-riding dance.

== See also ==
- List of tallest buildings in Seoul
