= KTNET =

South Korean trade service provider

Korea Trade Network (KTNET) is a South Korean paperless trade service provider. KTNET is designated as the National Paperless Trade Platform Operator, Customs Network Service Operator, and electronic Bill of Lading Registry and Purchase Certificate Issuing Agency by the Korean government. In accordance with the Korean government's basic plan for comprehensive trade automation, KTNET was established in 1990 with funding from the Korea International Trade Association (KITA).

KTNET, which the government designated as a trade automation business (presently known as National Paperless Trade Infrastructure Operator) in 1992, has contributed to the innovative improvement of trade processes and reduction of trade-related expenses by realizing automation services for all complex processes of export & import businesses through establishment of paperless trade infrastructure. It affects US$5.57 billion annually in trade and services.

Through a trade system linking about 97,000 customers and trade-related organizations, including trading companies, banks, customs brokers, shipping companies, insurance firms, forwarders, and bonded storages, KTNET has digitized c. 614 types of export & import documents in the G2B and B2B sectors, and processes an annual average of 370 million cases of paperless documents.

== Service Area ==
- Paperless Trade Service
- Electnoric Trade Financing
- Transport and Logistics
- Customs Clearance
- TradeSign Certified Certificate Authority(TradeSign)
- Paperless Trade Platform Export
