= Daemosan station =

Metro station in Seoul

| 대모산입구; Daemosan |
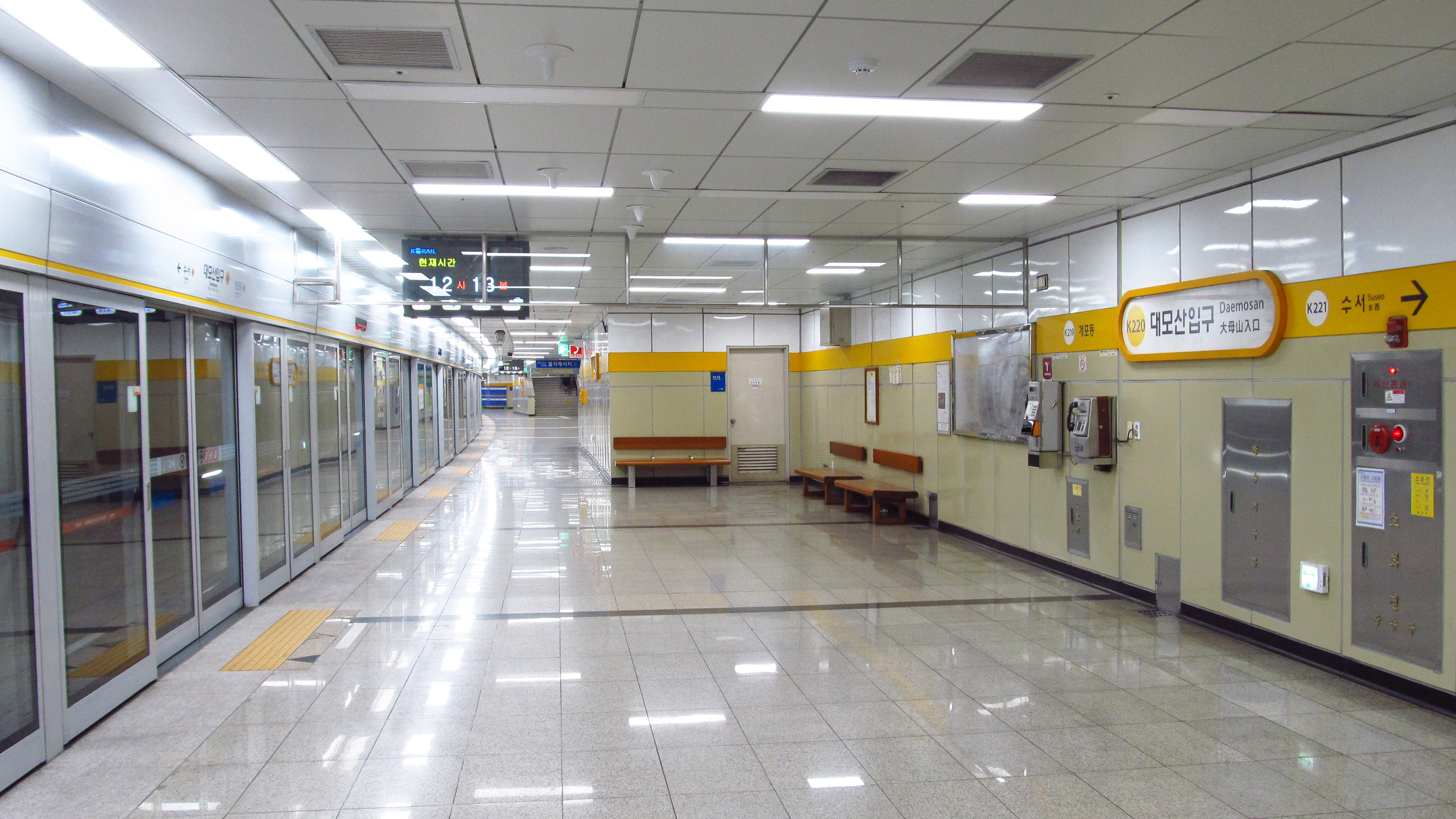

Korean name
- Hangul: 대모산입구
- Hanja: 大母山入口
- Revised Romanization: Daemosanipgu
- McCune–Reischauer: Taemosanipku

General information
- Location: 700-1 Irwon-dong, 522 Gaeporo, Gangnam-gu, Seoul
- Coordinates: 37°29′28″N 127°04′22″E
- Operator: Korail
- Line: Suin–Bundang Line
- Platforms: 2
- Tracks: 2

Construction
- Structure type: Underground

Key dates
- September 3, 2003: Suin–Bundang Line opened
Location

Daemosan station (Korean: 대모산입구역) is a station on the Suin–Bundang Line, a commuter rail line of Korail.

| Preceding station | Seoul Metropolitan Subway | Following station |
|---|---|---|
| Gaepo-dong towards Cheongnyangni | Suin–Bundang Line | Suseo towards Incheon |
