= Samseong station =

Station on the Seoul Subway

Coordinates: 37°30′31.48″N 127°3′48.67″E

삼성 (무역센터); Samseong (World Trade Center Seoul)
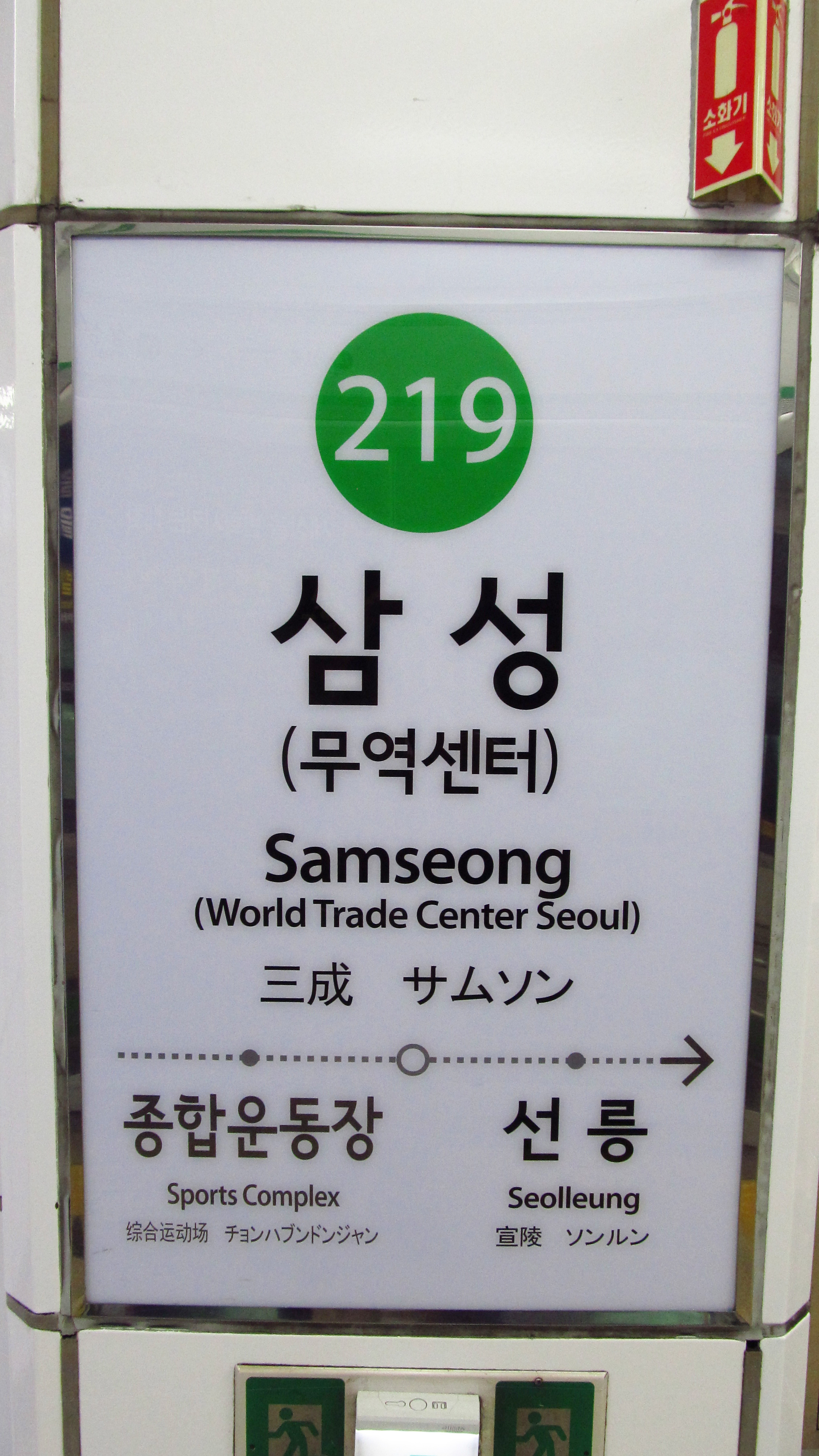
- Station Sign

Korean name
- Hangul: 삼성역
- Hanja: 三成驛
- RR: Samseong-yeok
- MR: Samsŏng-yŏk

General information
- Location: 172-66 Samseong 1-dong, 538 Teherandaero Jiha, Gangnam-gu, Seoul
- Operator: Seoul Metro
- Line: Line 2
- Platforms: 1
- Tracks: 2

Construction
- Structure type: Underground

History
- Opened: December 23, 1982

Passengers
- (Daily) Based on Jan-Dec of 2012. Line 2: 137,927

Services
Preceding station	Seoul Metropolitan Subway	Following station
Sports Complex Next counterclockwise	Line 2	Seolleung Next clockwise
Location

Samseong Station is a station on Seoul Subway Line 2. It serves the eastern area of Teheranno. Some of the more famous buildings near the station include World Trade Center Seoul, COEX Mall, Korea Electric Power (KEPCO) headquarters, Korea Air City Terminal (buses run from here to Incheon and Gimpo Airports, and vice versa), and Gangnam main police and fire stations. Due to security concerns, the station was closed during the G20 summit and the 2012 Nuclear Security Summit, as this station is directly connected with COEX.

The ridership of this station is very high, consistently ranking among the five most heavily used subway stations in Korea. The table below shows the average daily ridership between 2010 and 2012.

Year	2010	2011	2012
Ridership	69,863	70,501	68,002

Although the name of this station shares its pronunciation with the company Samsung, the Hanja for the company (三星) and the station (三成) are different, so there is no relation between the two.

The 836-meter (914-yard) section of sidewalk along Yeongdong Boulevard from exit No.5 of this station, outside COEX Convention & Exhibition Center and ASEM Tower is designated as a smoke-free zone by the Seoul Metropolitan Government.

== Station layout ==
G	Street level	Exit

B1; Concourse	Lobby	Customer Service, Shops, Vending machines, ATMs

B2; Platform level	Inner circle	← Line 2 Next clockwise (Seolleung)
B2; Platform level	Island platform, doors will open on the left
B2; Platform level	Outer circle	Line 2 Next counterclockwise (Sports Complex) →

== Vicinity ==
- Exit 1: Gangnam Police Station, Park Hyatt Hotel
- Exit 2: Russian Embassy of Korea
- Exit 3: Hwimoon Middle & High Schools
- Exit 4: POSCO Center, Daemyeong Middle School
- Exit 5: Korea Air City Terminal, Hyundai Department Store, InterContinental Hotel Grand Seoul Parnas
- Exit 6: COEX Mall (direct passageway), World Trade Center Seoul
- Exit 7: KEPCO Headquarters
- Exit 8: Gangnam Fire Station
