= Gangnam District =

District of Seoul, South Korea

Gangnam
- Autonomous District
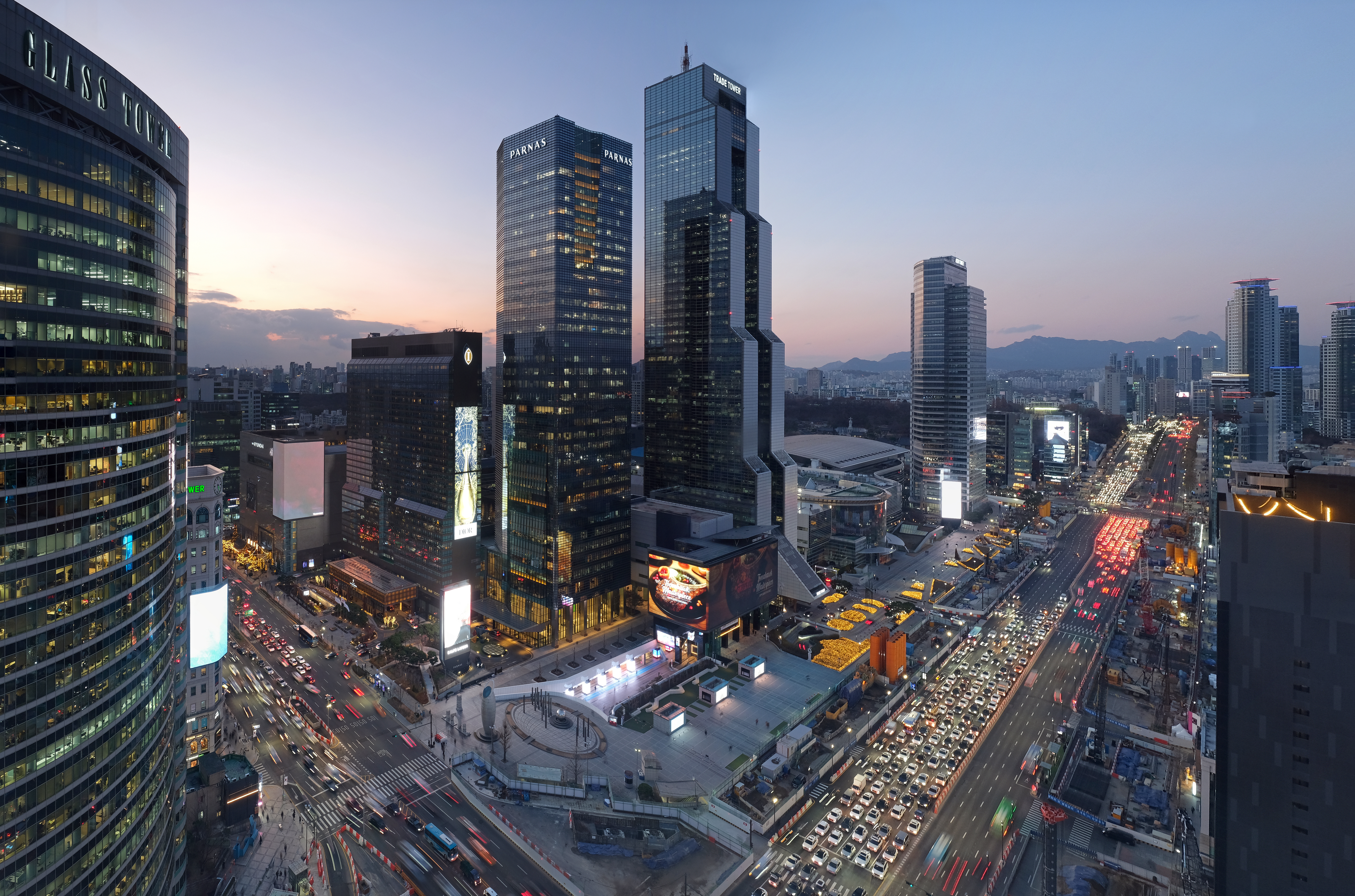
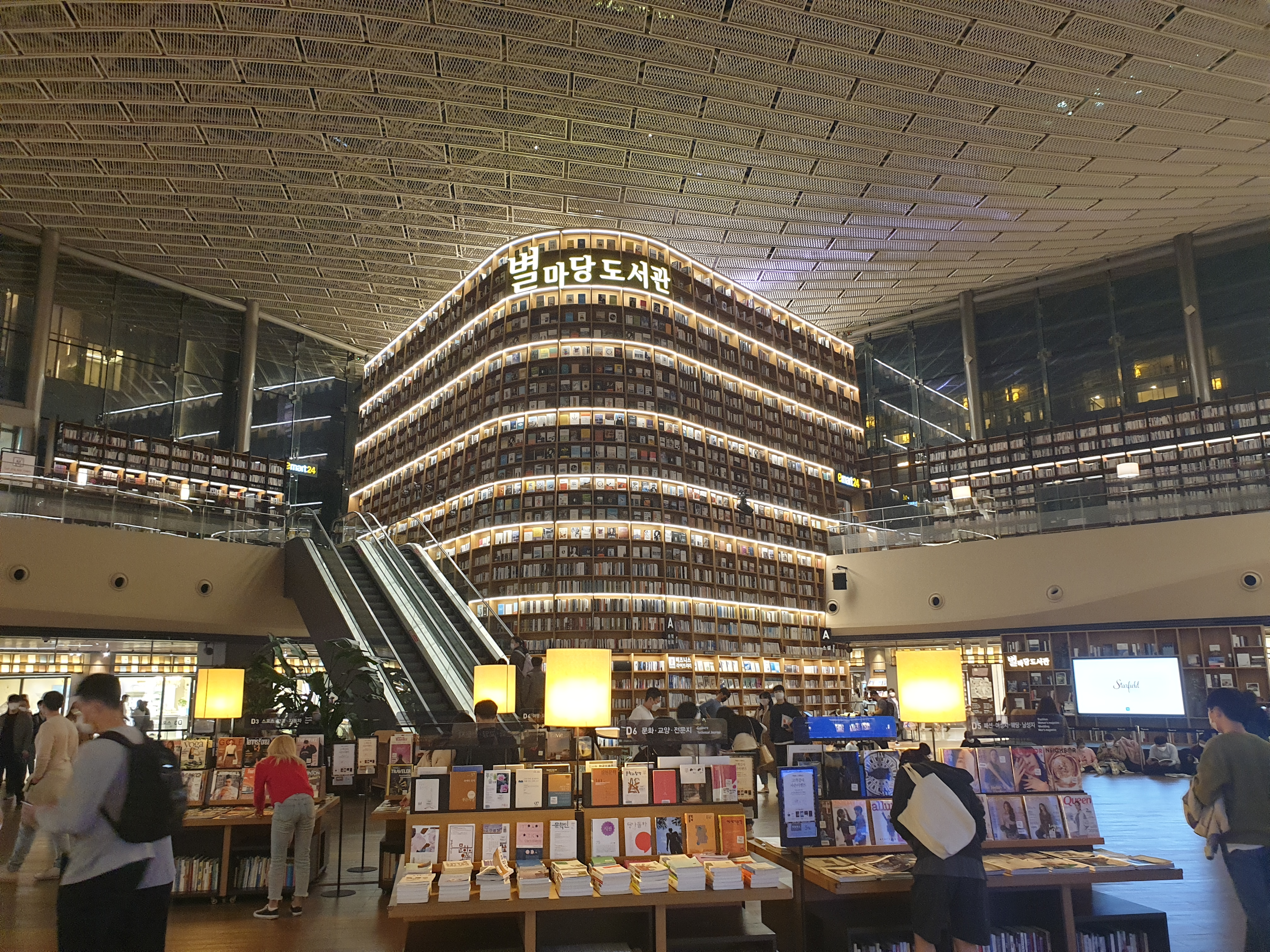
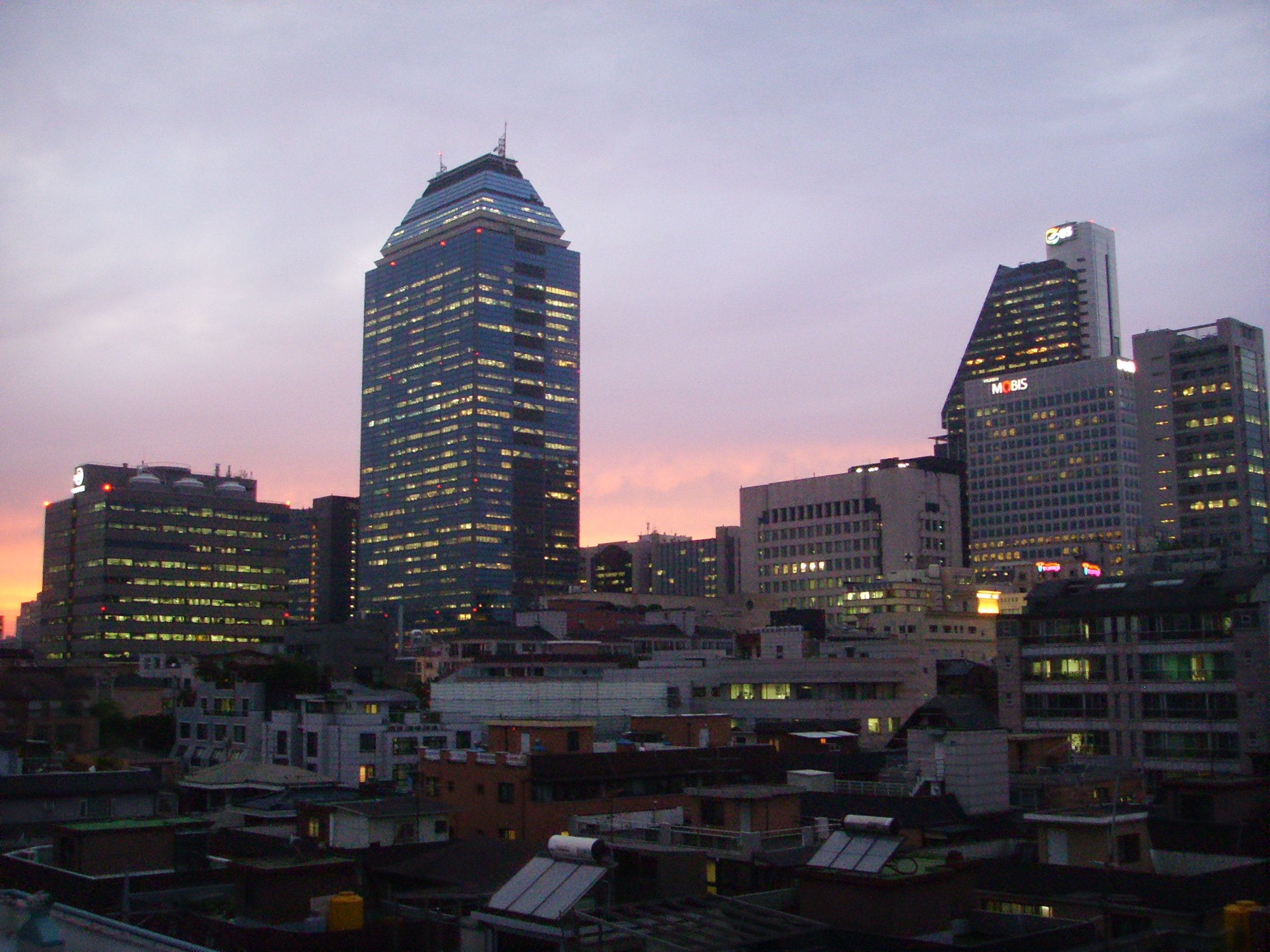
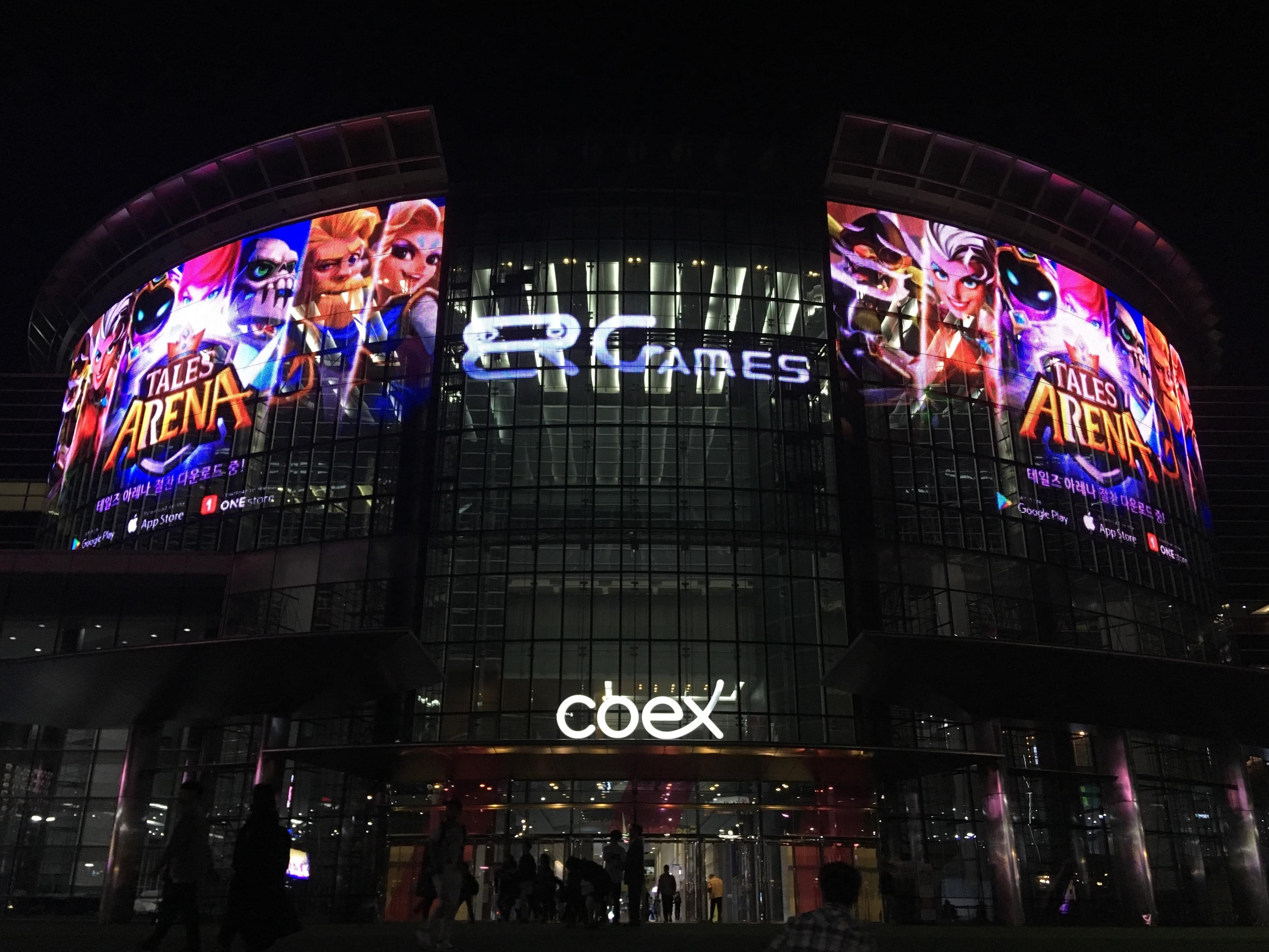
- Teheran-ro and Yeongdong-daero crossing Starfield Library Gangnam Finance Center COEX Center

- Flag

- Location of Gangnam District in Seoul
- Interactive map of Gangnam
- Coordinates: 37°29′48″N 127°01′39″E
- Country: South Korea
- Region: Sudogwon
- Special City: Seoul
- Administrative dong: 22

Government
  - Body: Gangnam-gu Council
  - Mayor: Kim Hyeon-ki (People Power)
  - MNAs: List of MNAs (22nd): Suh Myung-ok (People Power); Park Soo-min (People Power); Koh Dong-jin (People Power)

Area
  - Total: 39.49 km^{2} (15.25 sq mi)

Population (JULY, 2025)
  - Total: 556,492
  - Density: 14,090/km^{2} (36,500/sq mi)
- Time zone: UTC+9 (Korea Standard Time)
- Postal code.: 06000 – 06499
- Area code(s): +82-2-2226,400,500
- Website: gangnam.go.kr

Korean name
- Hangul: 강남구
- Hanja: 江南區
- RR: Gangnam-gu
- MR: Kangnam-gu

Administrative divisions

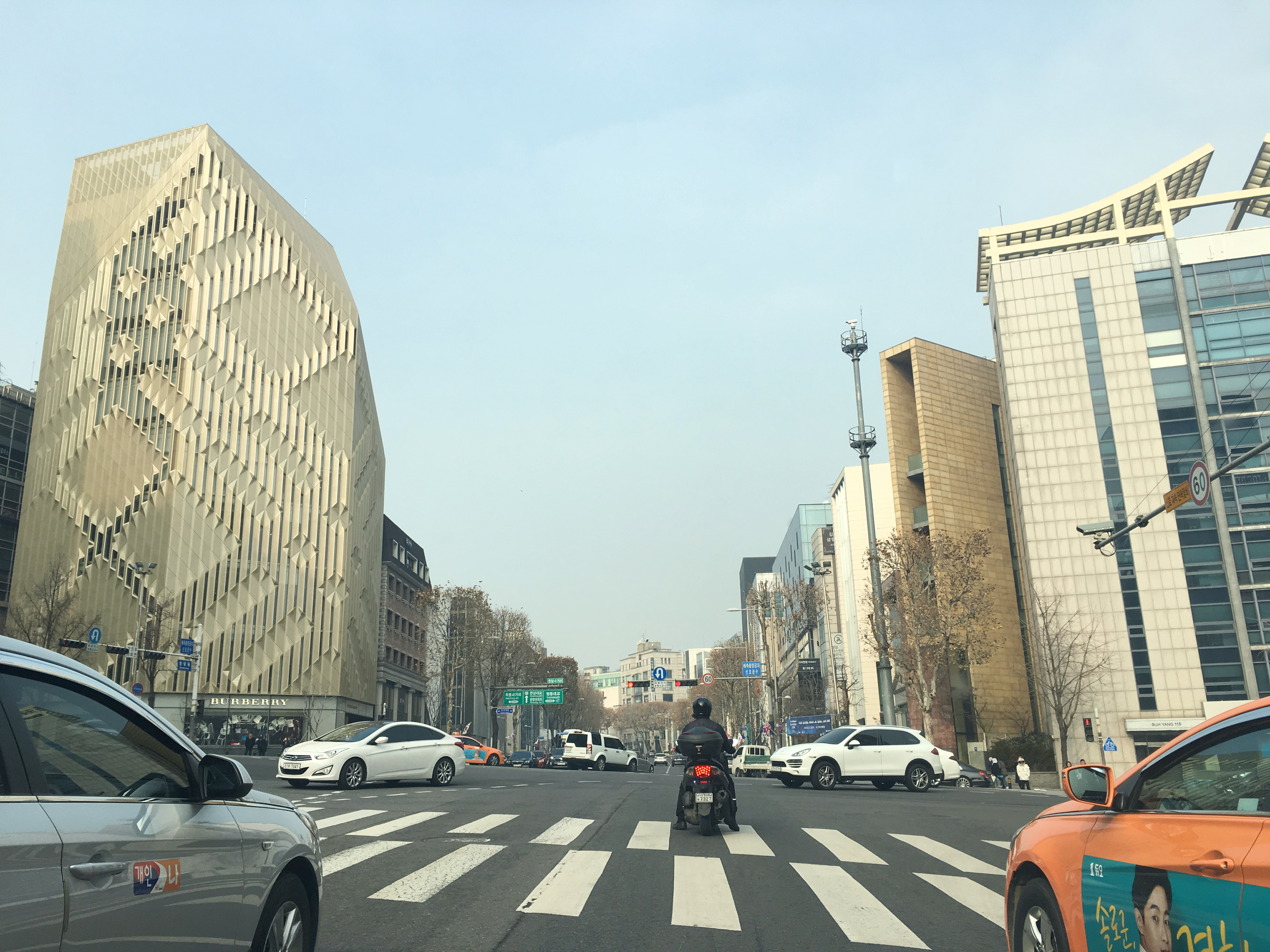
Cheongdam Intersection, the starting point of Cheongdam Fashion Street

Gangnam District (Korean: 강남구; pronounced [kaŋnam.ɡu]; lit. 'South of the [Han] River') is one of the 25 districts of Seoul, South Korea. It is a world-class fashion and trend center and affluent area, home to countless luxury homes, high-end brand stores, and skyscrapers. Gangnam District is the third-largest district in Seoul, with an area of 39.5 km^{2} (15.3 sq mi). As of the 2024 census, Gangnam District had a population of 556,570. There is a high concentration of wealth in the district, with prices for an apartment as of 2024 more than double those in the rest of Seoul. Gangnam District is a part of the Gangnam region, along with the Seocho and Songpa districts. (Note: Koo, Hagen (15 July 2022). Privilege and Anxiety: The Korean Middle Class in the Global Era. Ithaca, New York: Cornell University Press. doi:10.7591/cornell/9781501764912.001.0001. ISBN 978-1-5017-6492-9. OCLC 1295620078.: "Although not every area of Gangnam is affluent, its three core districts (Gangnamgu, Seochogu, and Songpagu) are definitely middle or upper middle class in terms of the residents’ economic status."; Jin, Min-ji (11 February 2023). "How did Gangnam become the Seoul epicenter it is today?". Korea JoongAng Daily. 중앙일보. Archived from the original on 26 February 2023.: "The term Gangnam technically means south of the river, and refers to three districts in Seoul below the Han River: Gangnam, Seocho and Songpa."; Yang, Myungji (7 February 2018). "The rise of 'Gangnam style': Manufacturing the urban middle class in Seoul, 1976–1996". Urban Studies. 55 (15). SAGE Publishing: 3404–3420. doi:10.1177/0042098017748092. ISSN 0042-0980. JSTOR 26533030. S2CID 158677717.: "While Gangnam can be defined in different ways – from the narrowest, limited to just the administrative district of Gangnam-gu itself, to the broadest, which would encompass the whole area south of the Han River– I follow the conventional and common definition of Gangnam as an area composed of the three administrative units of Gangnam-gu, Seocho-gu, and Songpa-gu.") This district shares half of Gangnam-daero Gangnam station area with Seocho District, one of the most crowded places in South Korea.

It is home to Bongeunsa Temple, which dates to the Unified Silla period. It also hosts Seonjeongneung, royal tombs of the Joseon Dynasty, and the earlier gravesite of Gwangpyeong Daegun and his family's land, which are preserved as national treasures. Apgujeong, in particular, became notable from the early Joseon period as the site of the villa of Han Myeong-hoe, a high-ranking official during King Sejo's reign.

== History ==
Until 1962, the area was part of Gwangju-gun's Eonju-myeon and Daewang-myeon in Gyeonggi Province, and it was incorporated into Seongdong District when Seoul's administrative districts were expanded in 1963. Compared to Jongno and Jung Districts, which have been the historical heart of Seoul for over 600 years since the Joseon Dynasty established Hanseong (name for Seoul at the time) as its capital, this area has a less prominent historical role.

With the full-scale development of the Gangnam (Yeongdong) area in the 1970s, the southern portion of Seongdong District (present-day Gangnam District, Seocho District, Songpa District, and Gangdong District) was separated to form Gangnam District in 1975. In 1979, the area east of the Tancheon Stream was divided off to create Gangdong District, which originally included the current Gangdong District and Songpa District. In 1980, Bangbae-dong and part of Banpo-bon-dong, formerly part of Dongjak-dong, were incorporated from Gwanak District.

== Administration ==
Gangnam is one of two gu that make up the Greater Gangnam Area together with neighboring Seocho District.

The Gangnam District office has designated two smoke-free zones within the district. The first is the section of Gangnam Boulevard between exit No. 2 of Gangnam station of Seoul Subway Line 2 and exit No. 5 of Sinnonhyeon station of Line 9; the second is the 836-meter (914-yard) section of sidewalk along Yeongdong Boulevard from exit No. 5 of Samseong station on Line 2, outside COEX Convention & Exhibition Center and ASEM Tower of the COEX complex.

=== Divisions ===
Gangnam District is composed of 12 dong (neighborhoods):

- Apgujeong-dong
- Cheongdam-dong
- Daechi-dong
- Dogok-dong
- Gaepo-dong
- Irwon-dong
- Nonhyeon-dong
- Samseong-dong
- Segok-dong
- Sinsa-dong
- Suseo-dong
- Yeoksam-dong

== Economy ==
Both the Greater Gangnam Area and Gangnam itself are widely known for its heavily concentrated wealth and very high standard of living, which has been compared to cities such as Beverly Hills, California. The most significant indicator is its extremely expensive real estate. Seoul as a whole is known for its expensive housing prices—as of 2011, its average apartment cost approximately US$5,500 per m^{2}—but the average price in Gangnam is almost twice as high, roughly US$10,000 per m^{2}, which is 3.5 times the nationwide average. This is driven in part by the price of land: the 40 km^{2} making up Gangnam district rivals in valuation with the entirety of the city of Busan, the second-largest city in South Korea which occupies 770 km^{2}. Combined with the neighboring districts of Seocho and Songpa, the Greater Gangnam Area accounts for almost 10% of the land value of the entire country.

While Seoul's traditional business centers such as Central District, Jongno District, Yongsan District and Yeongdeungpo District still maintain their leading roles, Gangnam and its neighboring districts have swiftly become the new core across all areas of business over the last few decades. KOSPI 200 companies based in Gangnam district include KEPCO, GS Group, Hyundai Department Store Group, HiteJinro, Hansol, Hankook, Hyundai Glovis and Korea Zinc Corporation. Besides, POSCO also operates POSCO Center in Teheran Valley, and KT&G operates Kosmo Tower. Other notable companies based in Gangnam include Dongbu Fire Insurance, Young Poong Group, T'way Airlines and Procter & Gamble Korea. Gangnam is also home to many IT and other internet-related companies including NC Soft and Pandora TV, and is also a strong hub of the country's financial and banking sectors. Many international companies also operate key offices in Gangnam, including Google, IBM, Toyota, and AMI.

Since January 2012, the area has also been home to FNC Entertainment, which moved into its own company offices in Cheongdam-dong, separate from its parent company in the CJ E&M Music Performance Division Building in neighbouring Apgujeong-dong. Other entertainment companies historically or currently located there include SM Entertainment (headquarters relocated to Seongsu-dong in 2021), JYP Entertainment (until 2018), Cube Entertainment, Pledis Entertainment, LOEN Entertainment, Source Music, Plan A Entertainment, DSP Media, MBK Entertainment, C-JeS Entertainment, WM Entertainment, NH Media, TOP Media, Jellyfish Entertainment, and DR Music.

The Korean subsidiary of American Megatrends, AMI Korea, is headquartered in Daechidong, Gangnam District.

=== Economic development ===
Until the early 1980s Gangnam and its neighboring areas had remained the least developed in Seoul, but development over the last 30 years has earned it a reputation of being one of the most affluent, dynamic, and influential areas in both Seoul and South Korea as a whole.

In addition, the COEX Convention & Exhibition Center in Gangnam recently hosted several international conferences such as the 2010 G-20 summit and the 2012 Nuclear Security Summit.

== Education ==
South Korea is known for its high standard of education and intense competition for university entrance, and Gangnam is considered the national capital of education, which is one of the decisive factors to make Gangnam the most attractive destination in South Korea. In 2026, roughly 25% of the successful candidates to Seoul National University, which is considered the best university in South Korea, were from Gangnam district, while Gangnam's population makes up only 1% of the country's population. In 2026, the educational focus has inverted from Koreans leaving to foreign students entering. Driven by the government’s aggressive Study Korea 300K project, South Korea shattered its targets early, hosting 314,397 international students. Following the substantial raising of the profile of the Gangnam district internationally, the area has become a popular destination for international students seeking Korean language lessons, marking the rise of Korea as a 'study tourism' destination. Both long-standing locally owned schools such as the Seoul Korean Academy, and more recent foreign-owned entities such as Lexis Korea report a significant increase in interest in the location.

International schools:

- Korea International School (한국외국인학교)
- Seoul Academy International School (서울아카데미국제학교)

Former schools

- Japanese School in Seoul

== Attractions ==
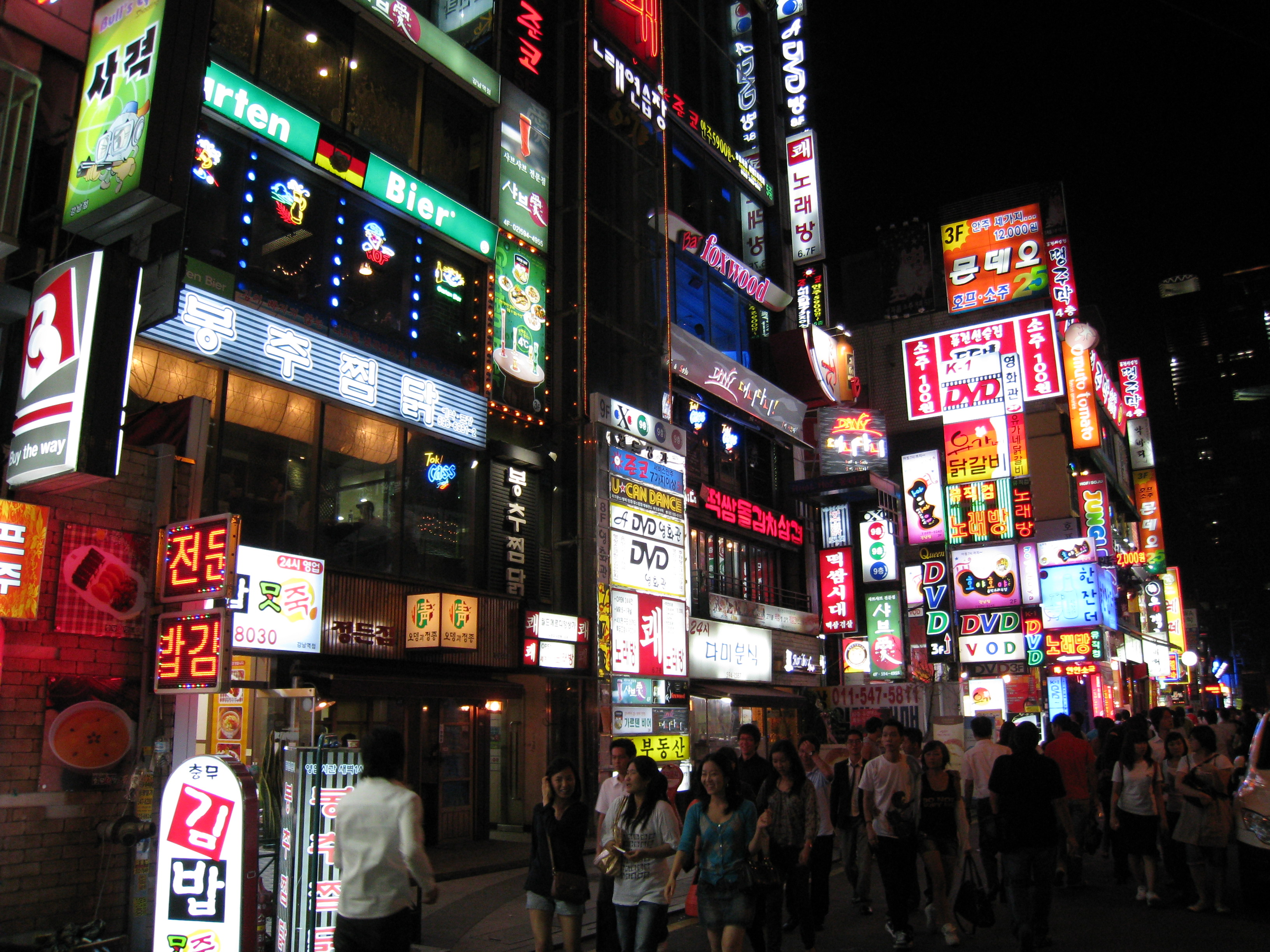
Gangnam District at night

The important business district around Teheranno (Tehran Street) runs east–west from Gangnam station to Samseong station and the COEX Convention & Exhibition Center-Korean World Trade Center complex. Several popular shopping and entertainment areas are located in Gangnam District, including Apgujeong, the COEX Mall and the area around Gangnam station and Garosugil.

Cheongdam-dong is notable as an upmarket shopping area, with stores of global and local luxury brands, such as MCM Haus flagship store; Vera Wang's third global and first Asian flagship store 'Vera Wang Bridal Korea'; as well as French jeweler Cartier's Cartier Maison, located on Apgujeong-ro, which is the largest in Korea and at the time of opening, in 2008, the seventh largest in the world.

The area has a large concentration of vegetarian and other upscale restaurants that serve Korean cuisine with a modern twist, namely on the main street from Bongeunsa to Park Hyatt Hotel in Samseong-dong.

- Galleria Department Store
- Seolleung and Jeongneung tombs
- Trade Tower
- Apgujeong Rodeo street
- Sinsa Garosugil
- COEX Mall
- COEX Aquarium
- Kukkiwon (World Taekwondo Headquarters)
- Korea City Air Terminal
- Simone Handbag Museum
- Bongeunsa, close to COEX Mall
- Dosan Park
- Metasequoia Road
- Nonhyun Furniture Road
- Yangjae Stream

== Transportation ==
Gangnam District is served by Seoul Subway Line 2, Seoul Subway Line 3, Seoul Subway Line 7, Seoul Subway Line 9, Suin–Bundang Line, and the Shinbundang Line, as well as high-speed rail services (SRT) and GTX-A at Suseo station.

- Korail

- Suin–Bundang Line

(Seongdong-gu) ← Apgujeongrodeo – Gangnam-gu Office – Seonjeongreung – Seolleung – Hanti – Dogok – Guryong – Gaepo-dong – Daemosan – Suseo → (Songpa-gu)

- Seoul Metro

- Seoul Subway Line 2 Euljiro Circle Line

(Songpa-gu) ← Samseong – Seolleung – Yeoksam – Gangnam → (Seocho-gu)

- Seoul Subway Line 3

(Seongdong-gu) ← Apgujeong – Sinsa → (Seocho-gu) ← Maebong – Dogok – Daechi – Hangnyeoul – Daecheong – Irwon – Suseo – (Songpa-gu)

- Seoul Subway Line 7

(Gwangjin-gu) ← Cheongdam – Gangnam-gu Office – Hak-dong – Nonhyeon → (Seocho-gu)

- NeoTrans

- Shinbundang Line

(Seocho-gu) ← Sinsa – Nonhyeon – Sinnonhyeon – Gangnam → (Seocho-gu)

- Metro 9 corporation

- Seoul Subway Line 9

(Seocho-gu) ← Sinnonhyeon – Eonju – Seonjeongreung – Samseong Jungang ← Bongeunsa

== Festivals ==
There are several festivals held in Gangnam District.

- International Peace Marathon Festival in October
- Gangnam Fashion Festival in October
- Sports Festival for residents in Gangnam Distinct in May
- Daemosan Festival

Following the anti-American protests in Seoul in the early 2000s, the local authorities in the Gangnam District have organized various cultural and sporting events, such as the International Peace Marathon, jointly with the United States Forces Korea. In 2009 they were awarded a 'special prize' by the US Army for promoting cultural exchanges with American troops.

== Popular culture ==
- The Caffè Pascucci coffee chain in Apgujeong-dong was used as one of the main filming locations for Seoul Broadcasting System's 2001 drama Beautiful Days, starring Lee Byung-hun, Choi Ji-woo, Ryu Si-won, Shin Min-a, Lee Jung-hyun and Lee Yoo-jin.
- Several subway stations in Gangnam and nearby areas were used as filming locations for the 2012 Hollywood film The Bourne Legacy, the fourth installment in the Bourne film series.
- The 2012 K-pop song "Gangnam Style" by South Korean entertainer Psy was inspired by the lifestyle of the Gangnam region and its music video was shot there as well. The song and video's popularity increased international awareness of the district. In the music video, Psy can be seen dancing on top of the ASEM Tower with the Trade Tower in the background. The two buildings are part of World Trade Center Seoul (WTC Seoul), also known as COEX.
- In December 2012, Cheongdam-dong was the setting for the SBS weekend drama series, Cheongdam-dong Alice. It stars Moon Geun-young, Park Si-hoo, So Yi-hyun and Kim Ji-seok and is based on the novel, Cheongdamdong Audrey.
- In May 2013, the Cheongdam-dong branch of 10 Corso Como was used as a filming location for the music video of Psy's single "Gentleman".
- The webtoon My ID is Gangnam Beauty (내 ID는 강남미인!) by Gi Maeng-gi, which is about a girl who underwent plastic surgery due to being bullied because of her appearance, was released on Naver Webtoon in 2016. Its title referred to the namesake district being called the "Mecca of plastic surgery", with the term "Gangnam beauty" being used as a pejorative term to those who undergo the process. In 2018, generalist pay TV channel JTBC aired a television drama adaptation of the webtoon which was produced by ACC Korea.

== Notable people ==
- CL, 2NE1 member
- Kim So-Hye, I.O.I member
- Kim Yoon-ah, Jaurim vocal
- Kim Chaewon, member of girl group Le Sserafim
- Kim Gyuvin, member of boy group Zerobaseone
- Baek Ji-young, singer
- Seo Jang-hoon, basketball player and broadcaster
- Psy, singer and rapper

== Twin towns – sister cities ==
Gangnam District is twinned with:

- Chaoyang (Beijing), China
- Gwinnett County, United States
- Licheng (Jinan), China
- Riverside, United States
- Woluwe-Saint-Pierre, Belgium
- Zhongshan (Dalian), China
- Buyeo, South Korea
- Boseong, South Korea
- Cheongdo, South Korea
- Cheorwon, South Korea
- Ganghwa, South Korea
- Gapyeong, South Korea
- Goesan, South Korea
- Grand Rapids, Michigan, United States
- Gunsan, South Korea
- Paju, South Korea
- Sangju, South Korea
- Sinan, South Korea
- Tongyeong, South Korea
- Yangpyeong, South Korea
- Yeongju, South Korea
- Yeongdo (Busan), South Korea
- Yeongdong, South Korea

== See also ==
- List of districts of Seoul
- Administrative divisions of Gangnam District
- Fashion in South Korea
