= COEX Aquarium =

SEA LIFE COEX, Seoul Aquarium
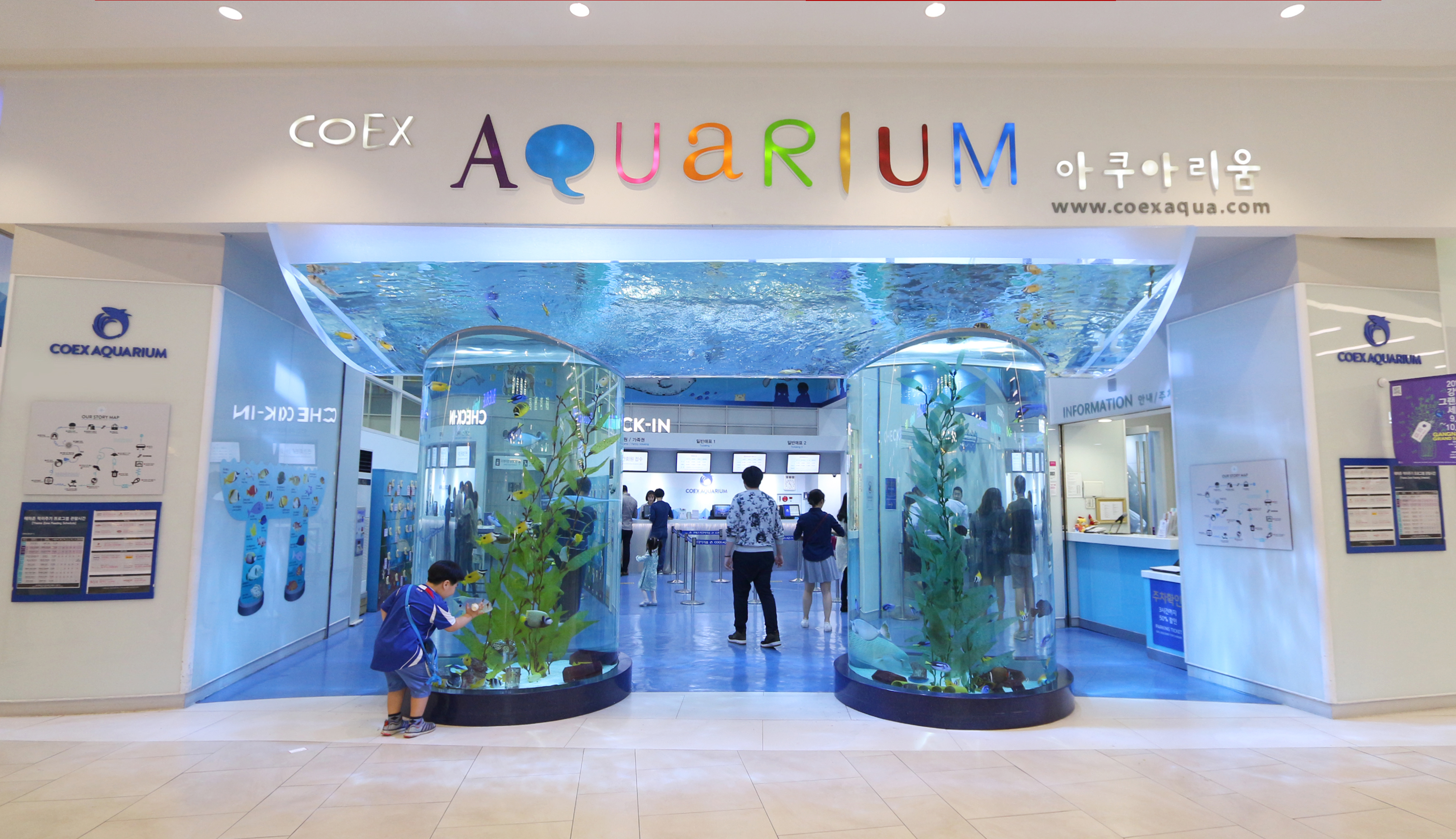
- Interactive map of SEA LIFE COEX, Seoul Aquarium
- 37°30′45″N 127°03′32″E
- Date opened: 2000
- Location: Starfield COEX Mall, Gangnam District, Seoul, South Korea
- No. of animals: 40,000+
- No. of species: 650
- Volume of largest tank: 2,000,000 litres (528,000 US gal)
- Total volume of tanks: 3,500,000 litres (925,000 US gal)
- Website: www.visitsealife.com/coex-seoul/

The SEA LIFE COEX, Seoul Aquarium (formerly COEX Aquarium) (Korean: 씨라이프 코엑스 아쿠아리움) is an aquarium located within the Starfield COEX Mall in the Gangnam District of Seoul, South Korea. The aquarium opened in 2000.

== Exhibits ==
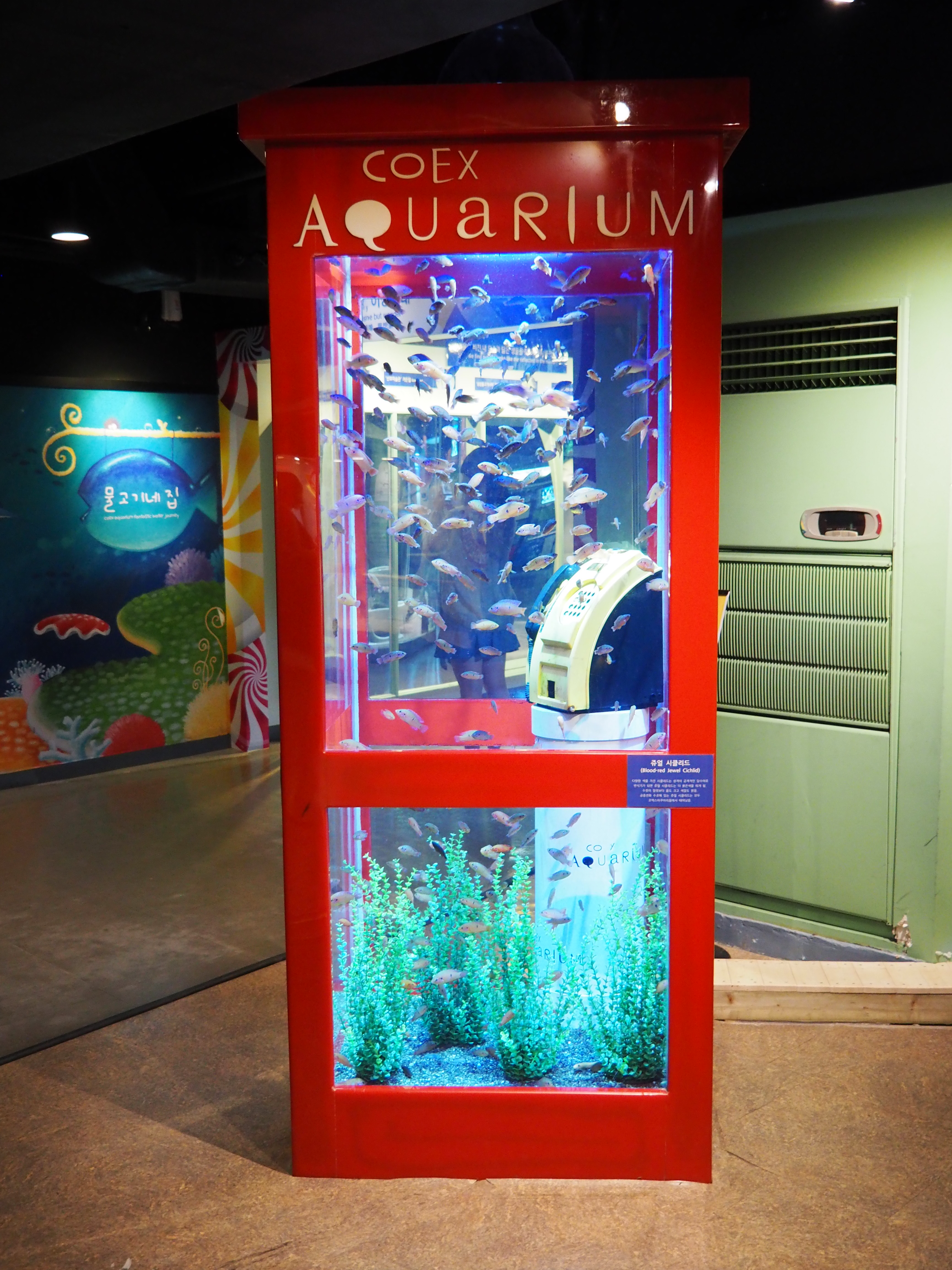
Telephone box Aquarium

The SEA LIFE COEX, Seoul Aquarium features 90 exhibition tanks grouped in fourteen "discovery zones", including six themed areas. The SEA LIFE COEX, Seoul Aquarium is arranged such that visitors follow a preset path through the aquarium, experiencing each of the themed areas in turn. Each exhibit features a dedicated aquarium tank where visitors can view species of fish indigenous to the theme location. In addition to fish, other local animals are included in the exhibit such as birds, otters, and appropriate vegetation is also included in each exhibit.

In the undersea tunnel exhibit, visitors walk in an acrylic tunnel through a tank containing 2000 tons of water. The tank includes sharks and sea turtles which swim around visitors in all directions.

In an introductory first gallery, six tanks are filled with fish which are changed each season. The aquarium also features exhibits detailing the local Korean river ecosystems. The SEA LIFE COEX, Seoul Aquarium also features several smaller exhibits, many with a focus on entertaining children. One such exhibit, titled "Wonderland", contains a collection of "eccentric fish tanks" including a shower cubicle, computer monitor, bath tub, and toilet bowl. Several exhibits specifically allow visitors to touch starfish and shellfish.

== Facilities ==
The theme areas, in order of presentation, are:

1. Check-In
2. Sea at Night
3. Rainbow Lounge
4. Story of Korean Fish
5. Garden of Korea
6. Rainforest
7. Marine Discovery Center
8. Mangrove & Beach
9. Maruelous Marine Gallery
10. Ocean Kingdom
11. Seal Beach Cove
12. Deep Blue Square
13. Deep Blue Sea Tunnel
14. Secret Garden of Seahorses
15. Penguin's Playground
16. The Gift Shop
