= Koh Dong-jin =

South Korean businessman (born 1961)

- 고동진
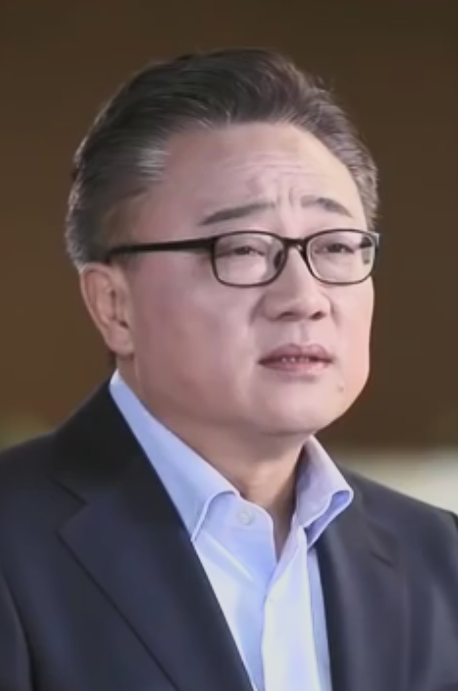
- Born: March 26, 1961 (age 65); Seoul, South Korea
- Other name: DJ Koh
- Occupations: Businessman, politician, congressman
- Employer: Samsung
- Political party: People Power

Member of the National Assembly
- Incumbent
- Assumed office 30 May 2024
- Preceded by: Yu Kyung-jun
- Constituency: Gangnam C

Personal details
- Party: People Power

Korean name
- Hangul: 고동진
- Hanja: 高東眞
- RR: Go Dongjin
- MR: Ko Tongjin

Koh Dong-jin (Korean: 고동진; born March 26, 1961), also known as DJ Koh, (Note: Informal English name alternative, from his Korean first name "Dong-Jin". Not to be confused with disc jockey.) is a South Korean businessman, politician and current member of National Assembly in the Gangnam C constituency.

In 2015, Koh became the head of Samsung Electronics and was in charge of its Mobile Experiences (MX) business. In January 2020, Koh stepped down to become a co-CEO leading the company's IT and mobile communications division, succeeded by Roh Tae-moon.

In 2024, Koh became a member of People Power Party, the then-governing party of South Korea, and elected as an MP in the same year.
