= Samseong-dong =

Neighbourhood in Seoul, South Korea

Coordinates: 37.5140°N 127.0565°E

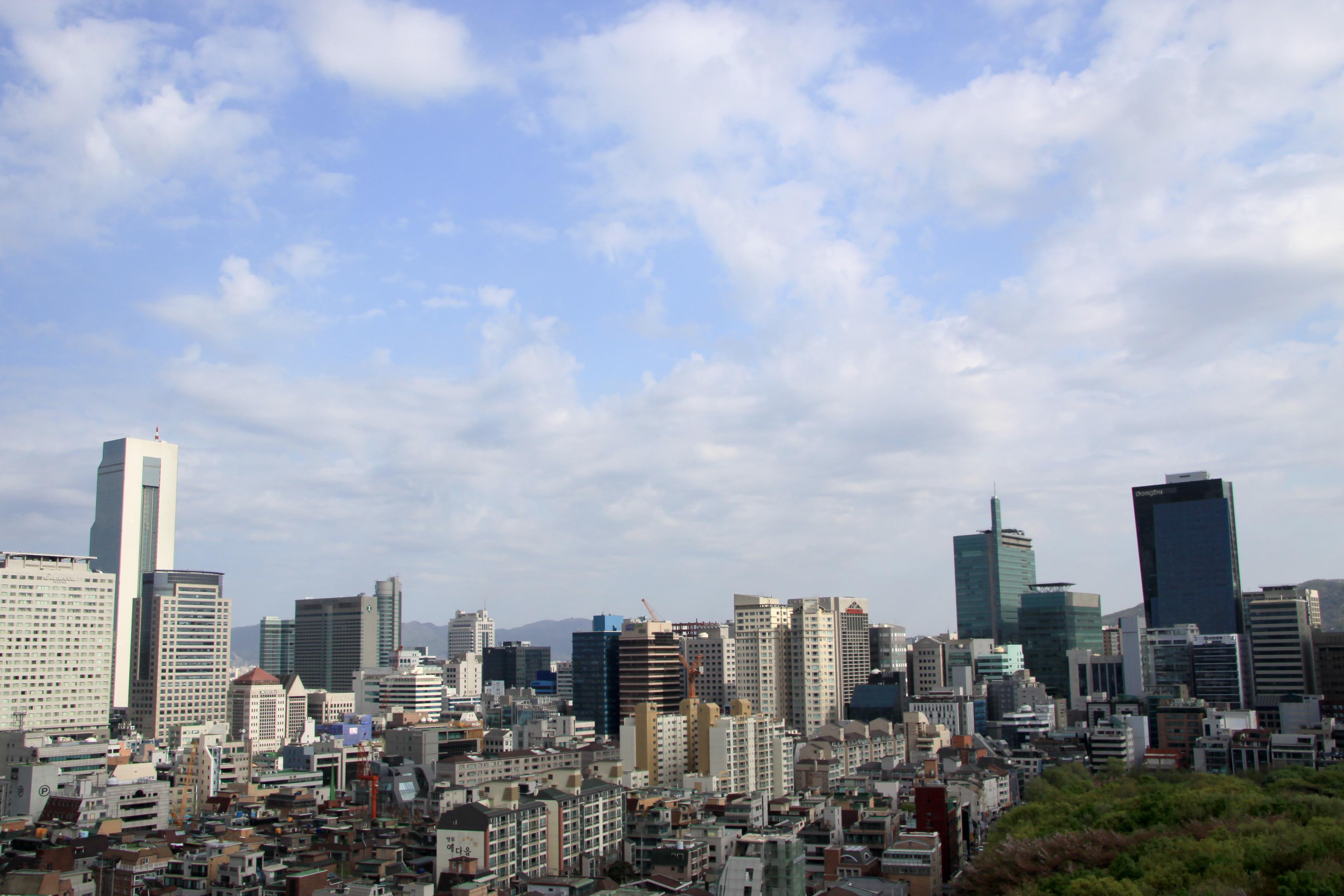

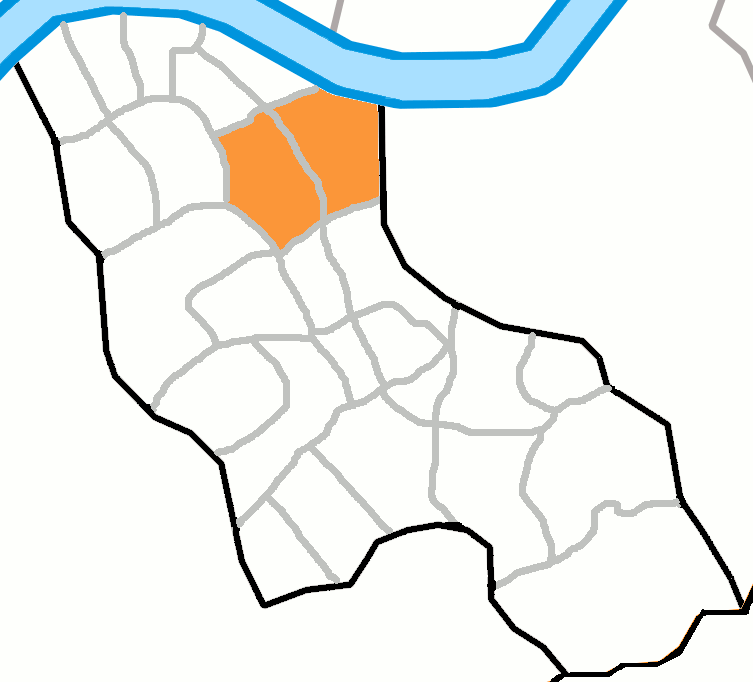
- Location in Gangnam District
- Country: South Korea

Area
  - Total: 3.19 km^{2} (1.23 sq mi)

Population (2001)
  - Total: 41,171
  - Density: 12,906/km^{2} (33,430/sq mi)

Korean name
- Hangul: 삼성동
- Hanja: 三成洞
- RR: Samseong-dong
- MR: Samsŏng-dong

Samseong-dong (Korean: 삼성동) is a neighborhood of Gangnam District, Seoul, South Korea.

It is considered an affluent area of Gangnam District, along with Cheongdam-dong and Apgujeong-dong. The area has a large concentration of upscale shopping malls, popular restaurants and hotels such as the Ramada Seoul Hotel, the Hyatt Park Hotel and Intecontinental Hotel. The Starfield COEX Mall, a major underground shopping mall featuring the Starfield Library, is located in Samseong-dong.

It consists of a large apartment complex and a general residential area, and the 56,000-pyeong Seonjeongneung is loved as a resting place for local residents, including a walk.

The designation itself has nothing to do with Samsung Group. It is coincidental that the names are the same.

The school district is also famous for its good quality. To the north of COEX is Gyeonggi High School, a prestigious high school, and its surrounding area is a rich village with expensive houses, villas, and apartments.

== History ==
- March 1, 1914 Gyeonggi-do District extension (Samseong-ri, Eonju-myeon, Gwangju-gun, Gyeonggi-do)
- January 1, 1963 Merged from Gyeonggi-do to Sudo-dong, Eonju Branch Office, Seoul
- May 18, 1970 Sudo-dong renamed as Cheongdam-dong
- September 1, 1977 Divided from Cheongdam-dong into Samseong-dong
- September 1, 1985 Samseong-dong divided into Samseong-1-dong, Samseong-2-dong

== Schools ==
=== Samseong-1-dong ===
- Seoul Bongeun Elementary School
- Bongeun Middle School
- Gyeonggi High School

=== Samseong-2-dong ===
- Seoul Samneung Elementary School
- Eonju Middle School

== Attractions ==
- World Trade Center Seoul
- COEX Convention & Exhibition Center
- Kimchi Field Museum
- Bongeun Temple
- Baekam Art Hall

== Education ==
Schools located in Samseong-dong:

- Bongeun Elementary School
- Samreung Elementary School
- Bongeun Middle School
- Eonju Middle School
- Kyunggi High School
- Seoul Jungae School

== Transport ==
There are two main transportation methods, subway, and bus.

- Seoul Subway Line 2
  - Samseong Station
- Seoul Subway Line 9
  - Bongeunsa station
  - Samseong Jungang station
  - Seonjeongneung station
- Suin–Bundang Line
  - Seonjeongneung station
- Yeongdong Highway

== See also ==
- POSCO
- Dong of Gangnam District
