= COEX =

Convention center in Seoul, South Korea

- 코엑스

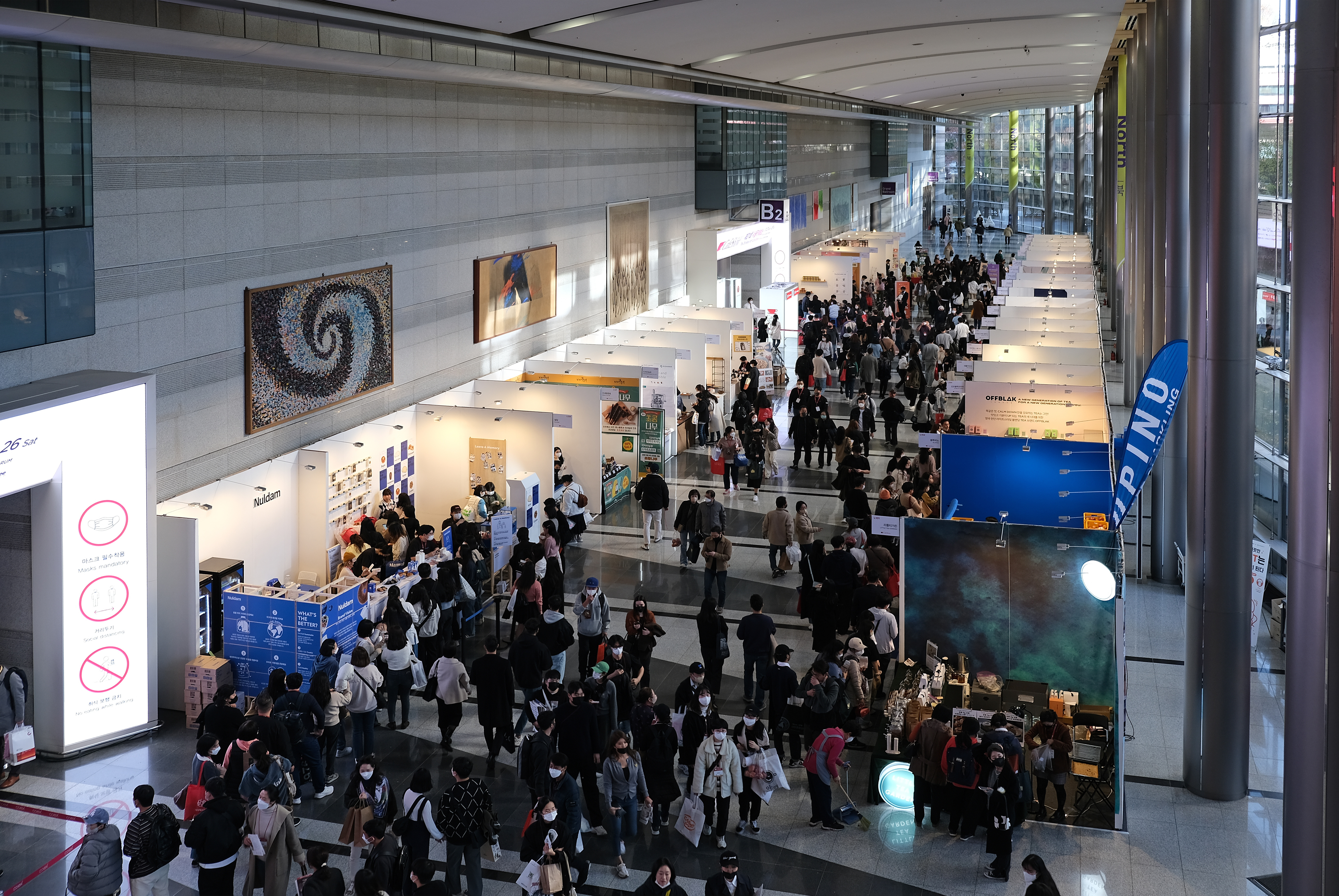
- Former names: KOEX

General information
- Location: 513, Yeongdong-daero, Gangnam-gu, Seoul, Seoul, South Korea
- Coordinates: 37°30′43″N 127°3′32″E
- Completed: 1979
- Owner: Korea International Trade Association

Technical details
- Floor count: 4

Other information
- Seating capacity: 1,080 (Auditorium); 7,500 (Hall D)
- Number of rooms: 4 exhibition halls, 55 meeting rooms

Website
- coexcenter.com

COEX (Korean: 코엑스) is a convention and exhibition center located in Samseong-dong, Gangnam District, Seoul, South Korea. COEX is a portmanteau of 'COnvention' and 'EXhibition'.

COEX is serviced by Samseong station on line 2 and Bongeunsa station on line 9 of the Seoul Subway. The 836-meter (914-yard) section of sidewalk along Yeongdong Boulevard from exit No. 5 of Samseong station on to exit No. 7 of Bongeunsa Station is designated as a smoke-free zone by the Seoul Metropolitan Government.

== Notable events ==
- The 2000 Asia-Europe Summit (ASEM)
- 2010 G-20 Seoul summit – November 2010
- 2012 Nuclear Security Summit – 26–27 March 2012
- International Congress on Mathematical Education – 8–15 July 2012
- TVing OSL Finals – 28 July 2012
- Seoul Motor Show

== See also ==
- Korea International Exhibition Center
