= Cheongdam-dong =

Neighborhood in Seoul, South Korea

Coordinates: 37.525°N 127.049°E

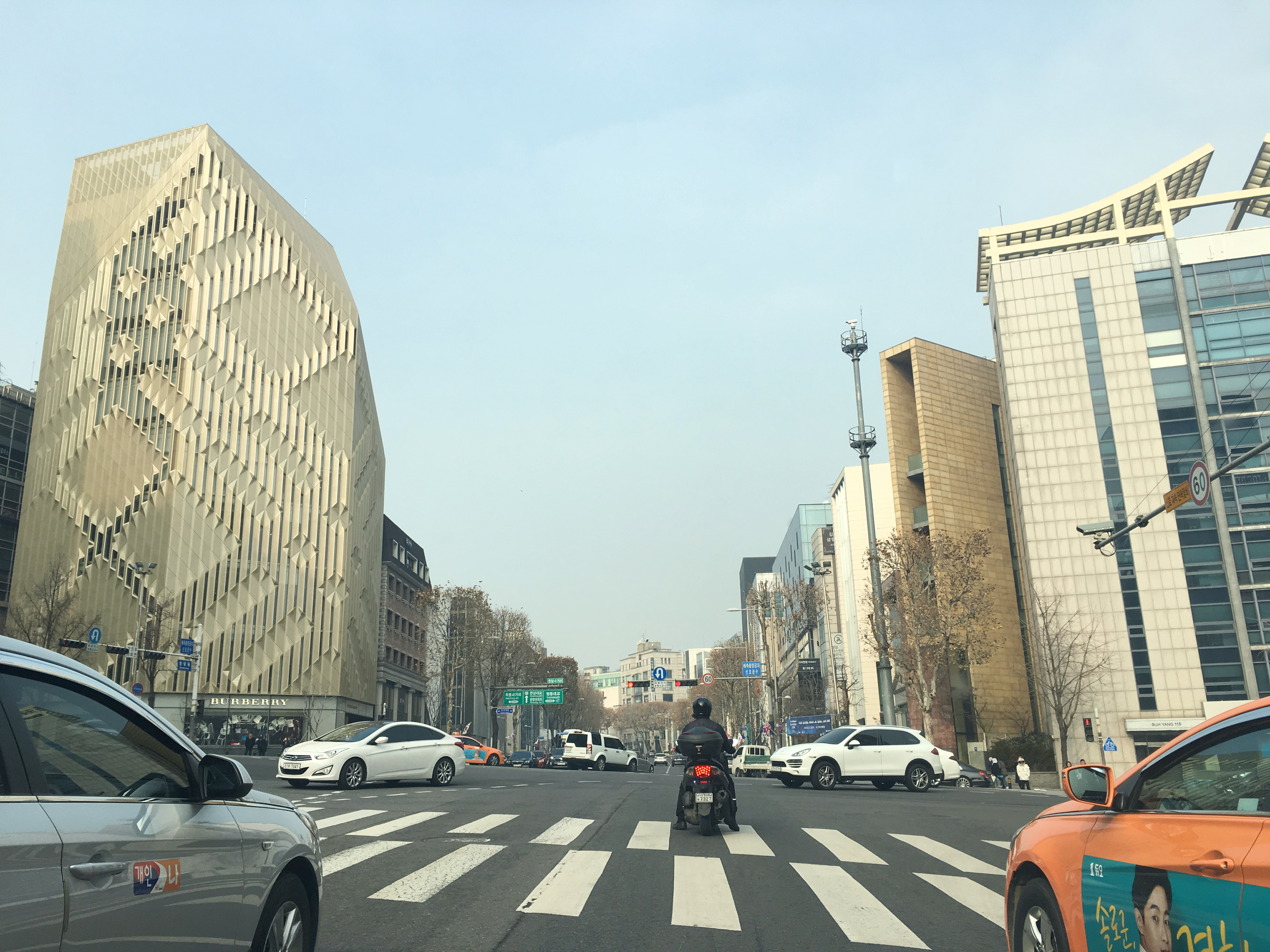
- Cheongdam Intersection, the starting point of Cheongdam Fashion Street

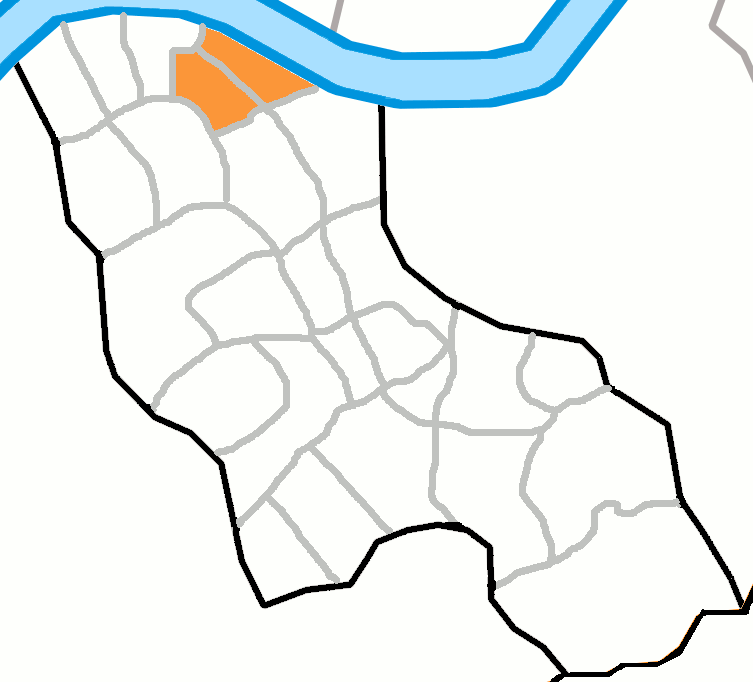
- Country: South Korea
- Region: Sudogwon
- Special City: Seoul
- District: Gangnam District

Area
  - Total: 2.33 km^{2} (0.90 sq mi)

Population (2001)
  - Total: 34,262
  - Density: 14,705/km^{2} (38,090/sq mi)

Korean name
- Hangul: 청담동
- Hanja: 淸潭洞
- RR: Cheongdam-dong
- MR: Ch'ŏngdam-dong

Cheongdam-dong (Korean: 청담동) is a ward of Gangnam District, Seoul, South Korea. The area is best known in South Korea as an affluent neighborhood populated by a disproportionately high number of high-income individuals and for having some of the most expensive real estate in the country. It is known as an upmarket shopping area, with the main shopping street dubbed Cheongdam Fashion Street. Along with Apgujeong's Rodeo Street in Apgujeong-dong and Garosu-gil in Sinsa-dong, which are connected by the main Apgujeong-ro, they are seen as fashionable and trendsetting destinations.

== Characteristics ==
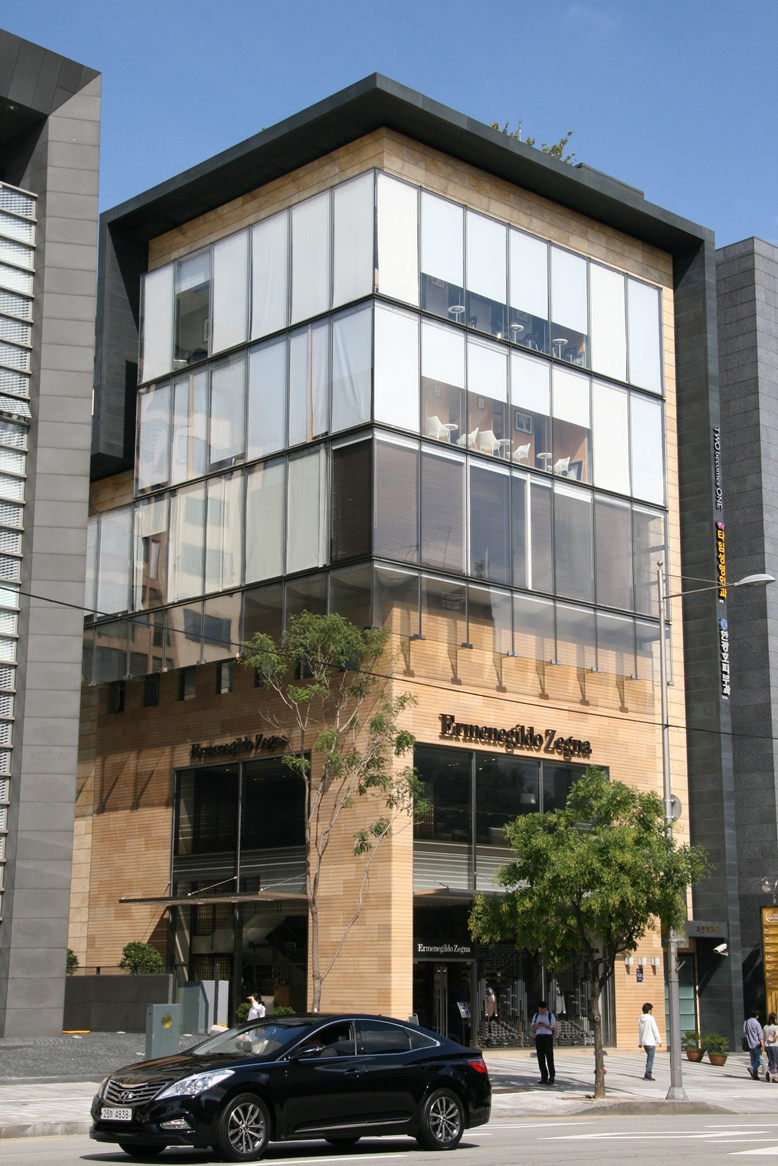
Ermenegildo Zegna store in 2012

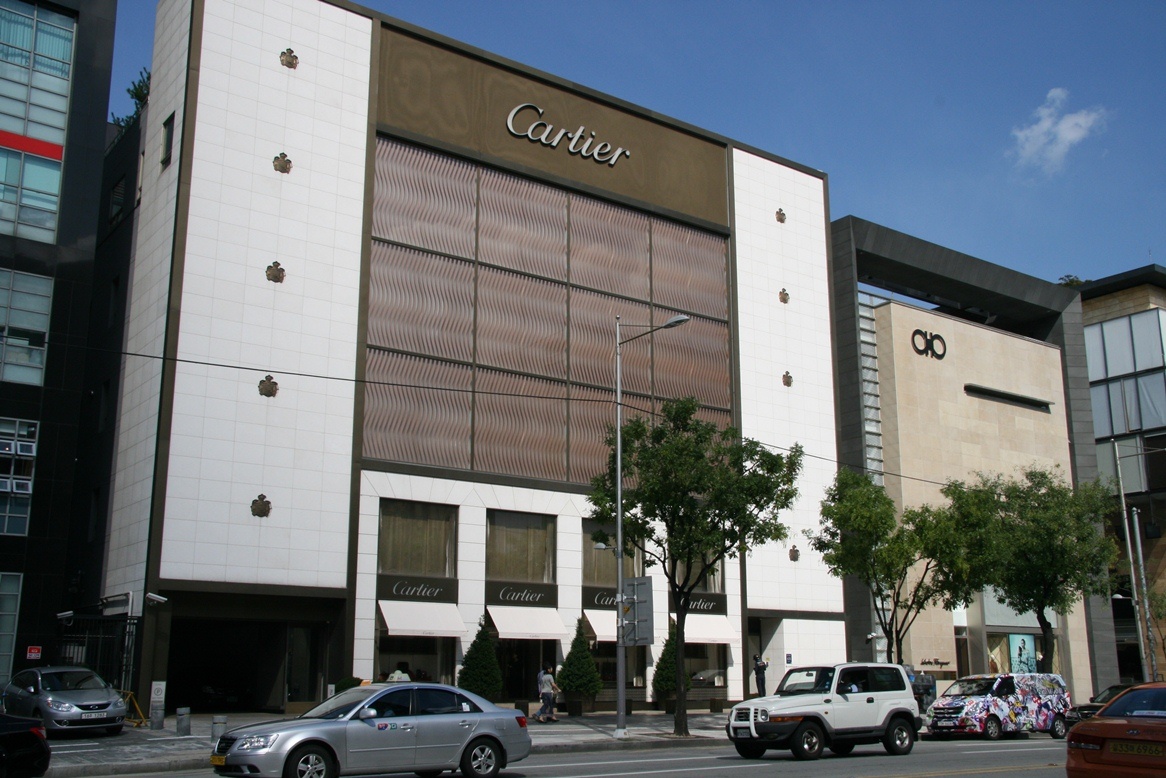
Cartier Maison and Salvatore Ferragamo stores in 2012

This area was originally named Chungsutgol which means clean water valley, for a clean pond that existed here during the Joseon period. Until Joseon Dynasty and the Japanese Colonial Era in the early 20th century, it was a part of Gyeonggi Province which currently indicates the outskirt of Seoul, the capital city of Republic of Korea. On January 1, 1963, Cheongdam-dong was incorporated into Seoul. On October 1, 1973, it became one of the 26 dong (neighborhoods) of the Gangnam-gu or Gangnam District. Gangnam District is one of the 25 gu (gu refers to local government district in Korea) in Seoul. In 1988, Cheongdam-dong was divided into two administrative sub-regions: Cheongdam 1-dong and Cheongdam 2-dong. However, on March 1, 2009, the two were officially merged back into a single administrative ward named Cheongdam-dong.

Cheongdam-dong was underdeveloped up until 2011, during which time, galleries moved to this area. It formed the existing gallery street, near the Galleria Department Store in Apgujeong-dong towards Cheongdam Park. Apart from galleries and luxury shopping the area also has high-end restaurants, bars, clubs, cafes and beauty salons; and known as an upscale residential area, especially for Korean celebrities such as actors and K-pop artists.

The 760-meter-long section of main street Apgujeong-ro, that runs from Apgujeongrodeo Station at Galleria Department Store to Cheongdam crossroad, has been dubbed the 'Cheongdam Fashion Street' or 'Cheongdamdong Street of Luxury Goods'. It is lined with stores of luxury brands, such as Ermenegildo Zegna, Salvatore Ferragamo, Louis Vuitton, Prada, Burberry, as well as outlets for 3.1 Phillip Lim, Martin Margiela and Tory Burch, and Korean designer Son Jung-wan.

== Attractions ==
The area is the location for the headquarters of many K-pop management companies. The MCM Haus flagship store is also located in the area. One half of the multi-colour facade is designed by British artist Richard Woods, while the other half of the exterior is decorated with individually numbered brass plates. It also has an Italian restaurant in the basement, furnished with Woods' designs.

Shopping and dining complex 10 Corso Como, opened in 2008, opposite the Galleria Department Store. Also in September 2008, French jeweler Cartier opened its first flagship store in South Korea, named Cartier Maison, located on Apgujeong-ro, with its facade inspired by Korean Bojagi wrapping cloth. Helmed by Managing Director Philippe Galtie, he said it was the largest in Korea and at the time of opening it was the seventh largest in the world.

In June 2012, luxury bridal gown designer Vera Wang opened her third global and first Asian flagship store 'Vera Wang Bridal Korea', helmed by President Jung Mi-ri, in Cheongdam-dong.

== Transportation ==
There are mainly three types of public transportation running in and through Cheongdam-dong: Bus, Subway, and Taxi. An electronic pre-paid card called T-money can be typically used for all three types of transportation, in addition to credit cards and cash. For more information about getting around Cheongdam-dong, visit the official Korea Tourism webpage.

- Bus: Buses of four colors run in Cheongdam-dong, just like in the rest of Seoul. Bus lines that pass through Cheongdam-dong include: 143, 146, 2415, 3414, 3011, 9407, 9507, and many more.

Subway: Three main subway stations serving Cheongdam-dong are Cheongdam station, Apgujeongrodeo station, and Gangnam-gu Office station. Subway lines that pass through this area are Seoul Subway Line 7 and the Suin–Bundang Line. Taxi: The most common ride-hailing app used in Cheongdam-dong and throughout South Korea is Kakao T (formerly KakaoTaxi).

== Education ==
- Cheongdam Elementary School
- Eonbuk Elementary School
- Cheongdam Middle School
- Youngdong High School

== See also ==
- Shopping in Seoul
- Fashion in South Korea
- Gangnam District
