= CJ CGV =

South Korean movie theater chain

- Trade name: CGV Cinemas
- Native name: 씨제이씨지브이 주식회사
- Traded as: KRX: 079160
- Industry: Film industry
- Founded: 20 December 1996; 29 years ago
- Founder: CJ Corporation; Golden Harvest; Village Roadshow
- Headquarters: Seoul, South Korea
- Number of locations: 455
- Area served: Worldwide
- Key people: Seo Jung (CEO)
- Products: CGV theatres; CGV IMAX; 4D Plex; Starium; ScreenX; Ciné de Chef
- Services: Multiplex
- Number of employees: South Korea: 1,525 (2016 non-consolidated); Indonesia: 77 (2020); Vietnam: 82 (2020); USA: 2; Turkey: 105 (as Paribu Cineverse, 2020)
- Parent: CJ Group
- Subsidiaries: CGV Arthouse; Mars Entertainment; CJ 4DPLEX; CGV Pictures; (South Korea); V Studios (Vietnam, Previously as CGV V Pictures); CGV Mars Dağitim (Turkey)
- Website: CGV Korea; CGV Vietnam; CGV Indonesia; CGV China; CGV Hong Kong; CGV Macau; CGV United States

CJ CGV (Korean: 씨제이 씨지브이; d/b/a CGV Cinemas) is the largest multiplex cinema chain in South Korea and also has branches in China, Indonesia, Myanmar, Turkey, Vietnam, and the United States. The fifth largest multiplex theater company in the world, CJ CGV currently operates 3,412 screens at 455 locations in seven countries, including 1,111 screens at 149 locations in South Korea as of 2017. CGV takes its name from the first letters of the joint venture partners at the time of launching; CJ, Golden Harvest (Orange Sky Golden Harvest), and Village Roadshow.

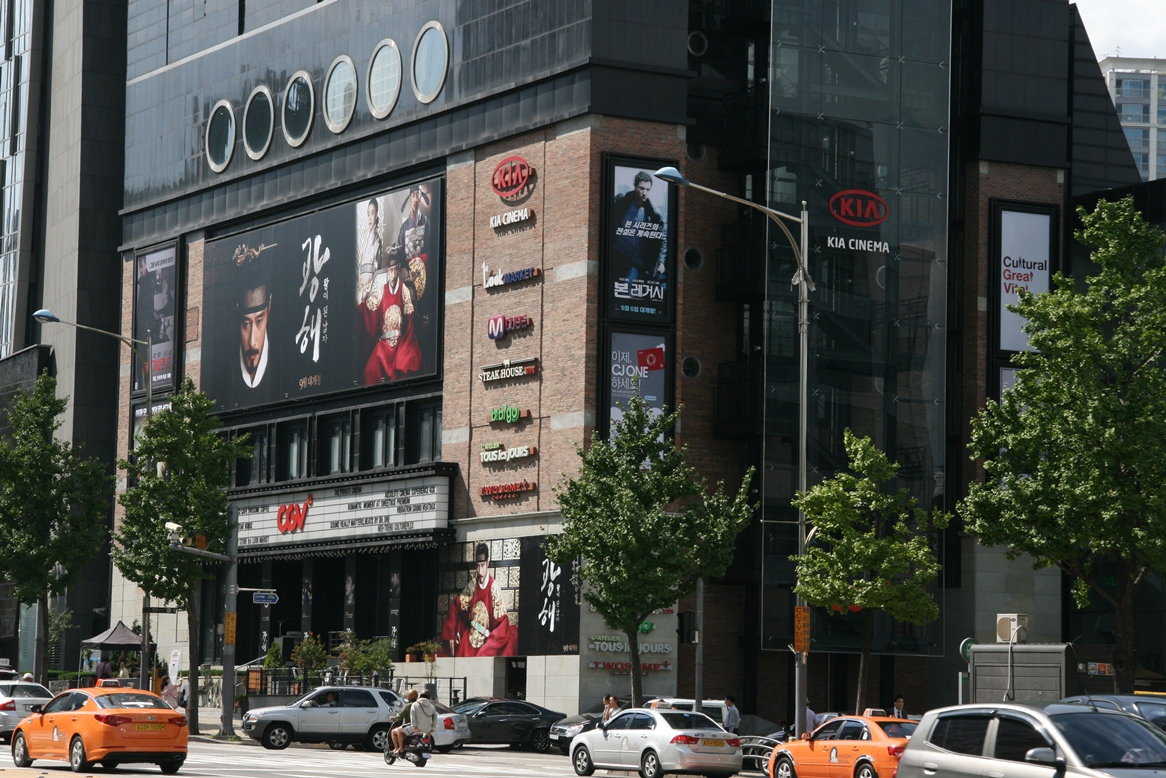
CGV Cheongdam Cine City in Sinsa-dong, Gangnam-gu, Seoul

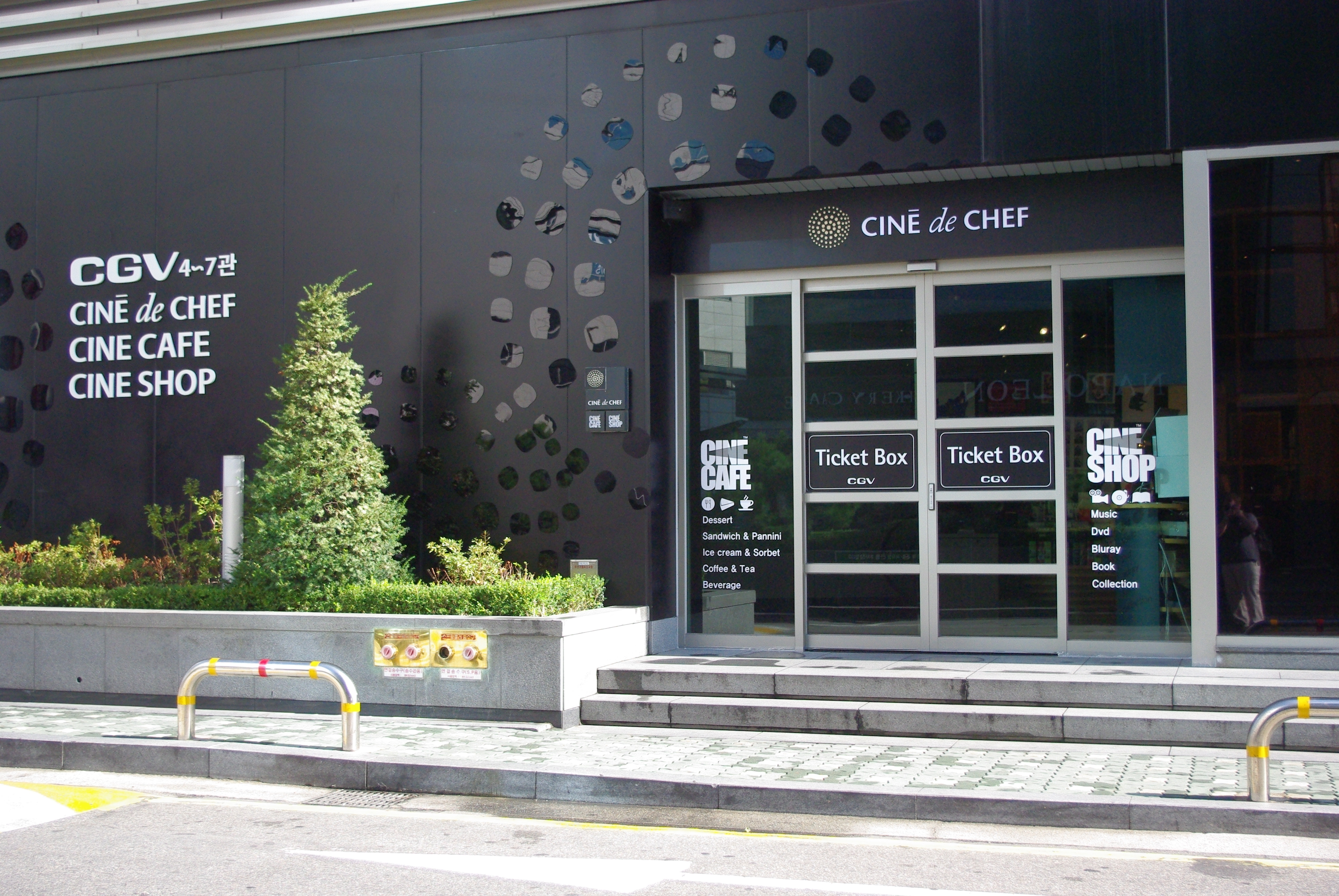
CGV CINĒ de CHEF theater

== History ==
CGV started as Theater Business Team inside CJ CheilJedang in 1995. CJ Golden Village was jointly established in 1996 by CJ Cheil Jedang of South Korea, Orange Sky Golden Harvest of Hong Kong and Village Roadshow of Australia. However, now it is operated by CJ only as Golden Harvest and Village Roadshow have pulled out of the group. CGV opened the first multiplex in Gangbyeon in 1998. It merged CJ Golden Village and renamed the company to CJ CGV. In December 2004, it became the first theater chain listed on the Korea Stock Exchange.

CGV exceeded an aggregated total of 100 million viewers in 2004. It opened its first digital movies in 2006, SMART PLEX in 2008, 4D PLEX in 2009 and Cine City in 2011. In 2006, it opened eight sites in China and one in Los Angeles, and took over major cinema chain in Vietnam. 2013, CGV had 101 million visitors within one year. It is the fifth cinema company achieving this mark, joining Regal, AMC, Cinemark and Cinepolis. 2017 saw the second U.S. location open, in Buena Park, in Orange County.

As of 2019, CGV held a market share of 49.5%, significantly surpassing Lotte Cinema's 29.1% and Megabox's 18.6%.

== Service ==
Culture Day

2D regular movie screenings between 17:00 and 21:00 available for 7,000 won reservation.

4DX DAY: All-day 4DX movie viewing available for 11,000 won (excluding ULTRA 4DX format).

SCREENX DAY: All-day SCREENX movie viewing available for 10,000 won.

Discounts

- Senior Citizens: Discount for individuals aged 65 or older with valid identification.
- Disabled Individuals: Discount for individuals with disabilities with valid welfare cards or equivalent proof.
- Military Discount: Discount for military personnel with valid identification and accompanying up to 3 individuals (total of 4 people).
- Police Officer Discount: Discount for police officers with valid identification and accompanying up to 3 individuals (total of 4 people).

== Timeline ==
- 1995: Theater Business Team formed inside the Cheil Jedang
- 1996: Jointly established by CJ Cheil Jedang (South Korea), Golden Harvest (Hong Kong) and Village Roadshow (Australia)
- April 1998: Opened the first multiplex cinema in Gangbyeon
- December 1999: Opened second multiplex cinema in Incheon
- July 2000: Opened South Korea's first premium cinema, Gold Class
- October 2001: Exceeded an aggregated total of 100 million viewers
- October 2002: Renamed the company to CJ CGV
- February 2003: Exceeded an aggregated total of 100 screens
- February 2004: Showed South Korea's first digital movie
- October 2004: Opened the first multiplex indie theater
- December 2004: the first theater chain listed on Korea Stock Exchange
- December 2005: Introduced South Korea's first IMAX system in Yongsan and Incheon
- October 2006: first to enter Chinese theater market (1st CGV in Shanghai)
- May 2007: Opened Cine de Chef, a premium theater with fine dining
- October 2007: Launched CGV 'Movie Collage'
- July 2008: Opened Smartplex 'edutainment' theater
- October 2008: Opened Starium in Incheon
- January 2009: Showed South Korea's first 4D movie
- August 2009: Opened Starium with Asia's largest screen
- April 2010: Exceeded an aggregated total of 200 3D screens
- July 2010: Opened the first CGV in U.S., in Los Angeles
- June 2010: Opened the Pyeong-chon CGV in Anyang, Gyeonggi
- November 2010: Launched new CGV BI
- April 2011: Started movie down loading service
- July 2011: Took over multiplex cinema, 'MegaStar Cineplex', in Vietnam
- November 2011: Opened Cine City in Cheongdam
- April 2013: CGV Junggye opened in Junggye-dong, Nowon-gu
- May 2013 : Opened in Samsan CGV in Ulsan
- May 2013: scheduled to open in Beomgye on May 16.
- January 2014: Acquired 14% ownership/stake of Indonesia's BlitzMegaplex through Blitz's IPO, which causes controversy due to regulations. Despite controversy, which since cooled down, the BlitzMegaplex cinema will be renamed as "CGV Blitz" in 2015. At that time, "CGV Blitz" opens in Jogjakarta's Sahid JWalk and its flagship "Cultureplex" at Grand Indonesia, while the rest of its theaters currently undergo rebranding and remodeling. It also stated that its franchise brand, "Blitztheater" won't be changed due to franchise agreement with mall operators. CGV Blitz Grand Indonesia was the first to operate SphereX technology in South East Asia, following footsteps of CGV China, who first to introduce the technology, and by CGV Korea, who opened their first SphereX branch in CGV Cheonho.
- April 2015: Introduced Vietnam's first IMAX system in Ho Chi Minh (CGV SC VivoCity)
- April 2016: CJ CGV Co. to acquire a 38.12% interest in Mars Cinema Group, Turkey's largest cinema chain, for $688 million.
- July 2016: CJ CGV increased their stake at CGV Blitz, setting aside 28.8 billion won ($25 million) to buy 50.6 million of its owner PT. Graha Layar Prima Tbk. shares by August 1, which leads to slow rebranding from CGV Blitz into CGV Cinemas.
- January 2017: Opened the 2nd U.S. location in Orange County, in Buena Park.
- September 2018: First Location in D2 Place in Lai Chi Kok, Hong Kong SAR.
- December 2021: First Location in Nova Mall in Taipa Macau SAR.
- July 2026: Founded the film distribution subsidiary "CGV Pictures".

== Facilities ==
CGV opened South Korea's first luxury theater, Gold Class, with sofa and service; along with Cine de Chef, the premium theater with fine dining in Apgujeong-dong, Seoul. This was followed by CGV Art Hall, a concert hall with 500 seats, in Yeongdeungpo-gu for concert, musical and broadcasting program in addition to movies.

Since 2009, with the construction of digital cinema, it started showing a variety contents such as baseball game, Japanese K-1, concert and opera shows. In 2010 FIFA World Cup, it was marketed as a location for cheering games with the most number of 2D/3D screens.

In 2011, CGV Chungdam Cine City, with luxury life culture concept, was opened. It markets CJ's own brands such as The First Look Market operated by Oshopping and Vips, Bibigo, Twosome operated by Foodville.

CGV Arthouse (formerly Movie Collage) is the first indie theater in South Korea operated by CGV for independent films (which later on became the name for a separate distribution company focused on these kinds of films).

From 2011, CGV extended their chain to Vietnam by taking over the multiplex cinema Megastar and opening more theaters like CGV Liberty Citypoint and CGV Crescent Mall. CGV opened their first luxury theater in Vietnam with sofas and went on to offer the Sweetbox (a red sofa that seats two) in multiple theaters. In 2015, CGV opened its 10th cinema complex (CGV Vivocity) and introduced the first IMAX theater in Vietnam with 311 seats, one premium studio with wide spaces and armchairs, and one studio for showing 4DX movies (augmented with environmental effects such as seat motion, wind, rain, fog, lighting, and aroma along with the standard video and audio thanks to a motion picture technology owned and developed CJ 4DPLEX). The remaining studios have Sweetbox seats as private spaces for couples.

CJ CGV is the second-largest operator of joint venture IMAX screens in China, behind Wanda Cinemas, China's largest theater chain.

== Special theaters ==
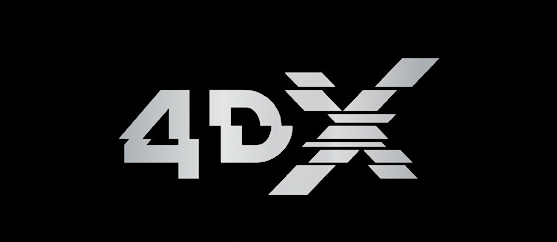
4DX former logo

- 4DX - 4DX was created by CJ 4DPLEX (a subsidiary of CJ CGV), the world's first 4-D cinema, company and the technology enhances the on-screen visuals of action-packed blockbusters with special-effects that include motion-activated seats, wind, fog, rain, lightning, vibration, snow, and scents. CJ's 4DX systems are offered by theater owners in 41 countries.
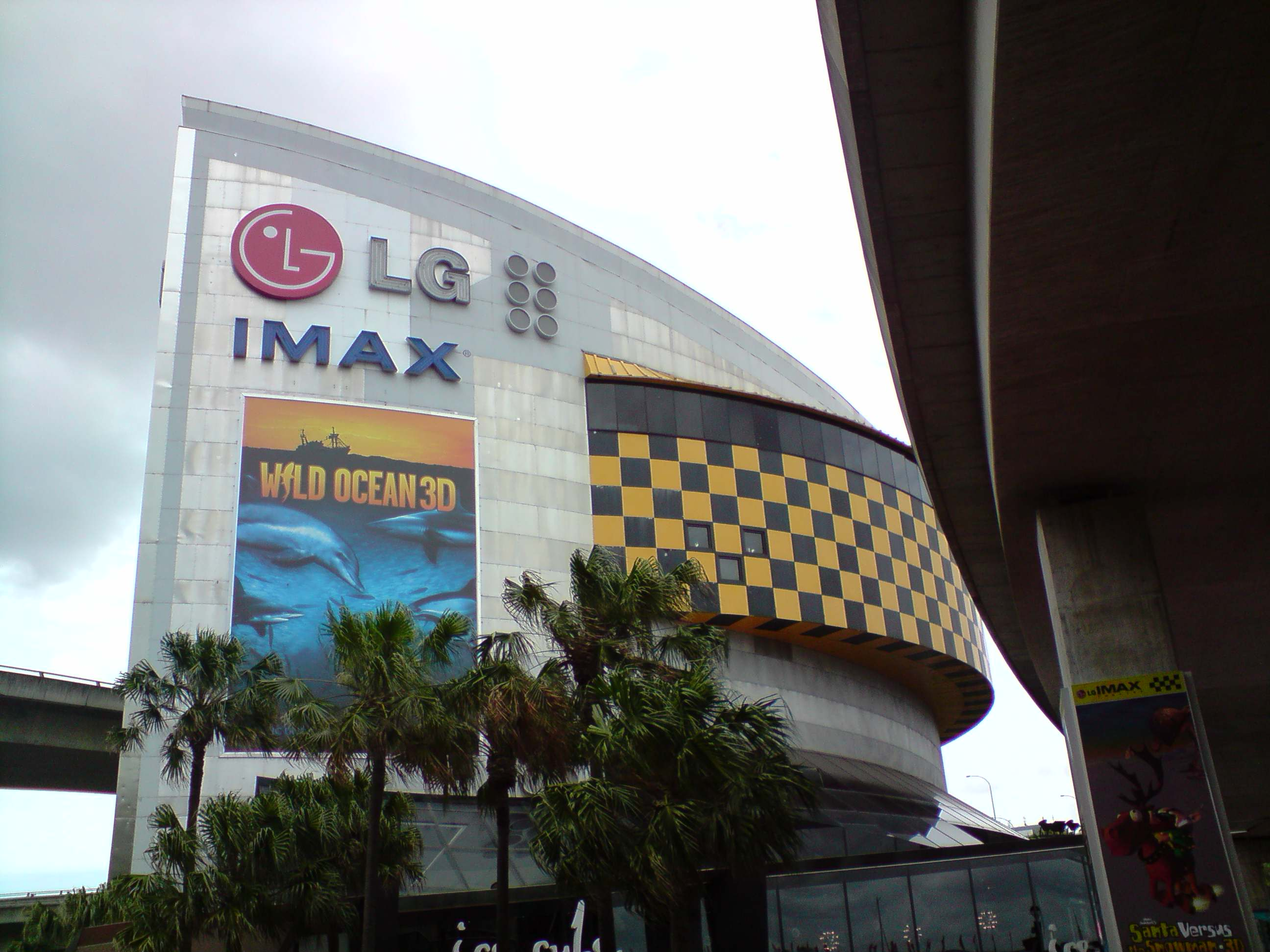
- IMAX
  IMAX - IMAX is a specialized high-definition movie format. It features a 1.43:1 unique aspect ratio and high-resolution. CJ CGV only represent IMAX format in South Korea.
- ScreenX - ScreenX uses three sides of a theater as screens to project images. It was developed in 2012 by CJ CGV and KAIST.
- SweetBox - SweetBox is a premium-seat for a couple. It added two-seats together with no arm-rest.
- Starium - There are two Starium screens in South Korea. They are in Centum City, Busan and Yeongdeung-po, Seoul. The Yeongdeungpo Stadium CGV has been officially listed in the Guinness Book of World Records as the "World's Biggest Screen" until 2014. The theater features a very large screen, a very high-resolution digital image, and a 16-channel sound system.
- Velvet (Indonesia)/L'Amour (Vietnam) - Velvet was first introduced by CGV Pacific Place when it was known as Blitzmegaplex Pacific Place in 2007. It features a queen-size sofa bed with the works (pillows and blankets), and service button on each sofa bed, enabling customers to order food and beverages without leaving the theater. CGV Vietnam adopted the concept and named it L'AMOUR in 2017.

== Events ==
- 2004: Sangam CGV Multiplex Cinema in the World Cup Mall, Seoul World Cup Stadium at Seongsan-dong was used as the filming location for Seoul Broadcasting System (SBS)'s drama Lovers in Paris. It was used as the cinema CSV of Baek Seung-kyung, Ki-joo's ex-wife, played by Park Shin-yang, also where Tae-young, played by Kim Jung-eun, worked and had the pajama party.
- 5 March 2012: Shinhwa comeback press conference after a four-year hiatus, where they served mandatory military service, was held at CGV Cheongdam-dong, which was also streamed live by Mnet Media to 200 countries.
- 30 April 2012: Showcase for film I AM. - SM Town Live World Tour in Madison Square Garden, released on 10 May, by SM Town artists at CGV Yeongdeungpo-gu.

== Recognition ==
- Globalization Achievement, CinemaCon 2011: CGV was awarded a prize of 'Globalization Achievement' for its efforts in leading South Korean cinema business and commercialize of the first 4D system in the world.
- In 2012, CNN Go listed 4DX and Cine de Chef on its list of "Movie theaters: 10 of the world's best".

== See also ==
- Megabox
- Lotte Cinema
