= Garosu-gil =

Shopping street in Seoul, South Korea

- View of the street (2017)

Korean name
- Hangul: 가로수길
- Hanja: 街路樹길
- RR: Garosu-gil
- MR: Karosu-kil

Garosu-gil (Korean: 가로수길) is an upscale area in Sinsa-dong, Gangnam District, Seoul, South Korea. The name means "tree-lined street", referring to the ginkgo trees planted along the streets in the area. Garosu-gil is known for luxury boutiques, galleries, restaurants, and cafes.

Garosu-gil, Fashion Street in Cheongdam-dong and Rodeo Street in Apgujeong-dong are connected by the main Apgujeong-ro and are the main fashionable and trendsetting areas in Seoul.

== History ==
In the 1980s, art galleries started to move into the area, after which a variety of cultural facilities have formed. These have provided the foundation of Garosu-gil. Later in the 1990s, the area began to attract young artists and fashion designers, the latter of which would launch their own brands, transforming Garosu-gil into the "Designer Street." Many small shops and restaurants, as well as a wide range of popular clothing stores, have since moved into the neighborhood. Based on this history, Garosu-gil presents a fascinating dichotomy of the old and new.

The first Apple Store in South Korea, Apple Garosugil, opened on the street in January 2018. Over time, Garosu-gil has evolved into a key commercial hub for flagship stores of major international and domestic lifestyle, eyewear, and fashion brands, such as Gentle Monster, Tamburins, and Maison Kitsuné.

== Transportation ==
- Sinsa station (Line 3 and Shinbundang Line)
- Apgujeong station (Line 3)

== Gallery ==
Map of the surrounding area, with Garosu-gil highlighted in blue

The street at night (2009)
