= Gangnam-gu Office station =

Train station in Seoul, South Korea

강남구청; Gangnam-gu Office
강남구청; Gangnam-gu Office
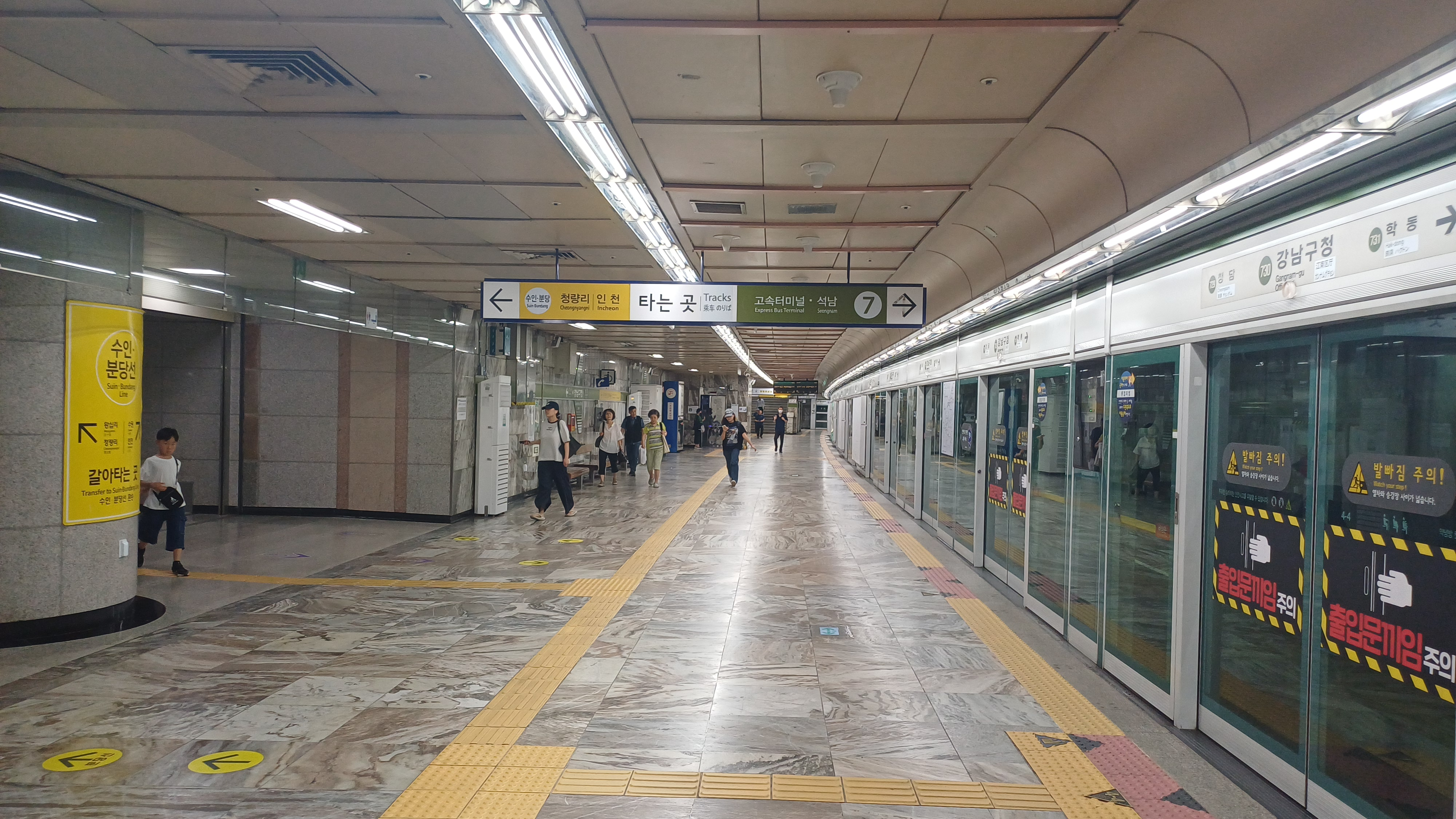
- Station Platform (Line 7)

Korean name
- Hangul: 강남구청역
- Hanja: 江南區廳驛
- Revised Romanization: Gangnamgucheongnyeok
- McCune–Reischauer: Kangnamguch'ŏngnyŏk

General information
- Location: 111-44 Samseong-dong, 346 Hakdongno Jiha, Gangnam-gu, Seoul
- Coordinates: 37°31′02″N 127°02′29″E
- Operator: Seoul Metro; Korail
- Lines: Line 7 Suin–Bundang Line
- Platforms: 4
- Tracks: 4

Construction
- Structure type: Underground

Key dates
- August 1, 2000: Line 7 opened
- October 6, 2012: Suin–Bundang Line opened
Location

Gangnam-gu Office Station (Korean: 강남구청역) is a station on Seoul Subway Line 7 and the Suin–Bundang Line in the Gangnam district of Seoul.

The station serves the southern area of Apgujeong-dong, and is closer to various parts of Apgujeong than Apgujeong Station.

The Gangnam - University of California, Riverside (GNUCR) International Education Center and the SK Blue Hub building are adjacent to the station. The eponymous Gangnam-gu local government district headquarters is a short distance to the east of the station.

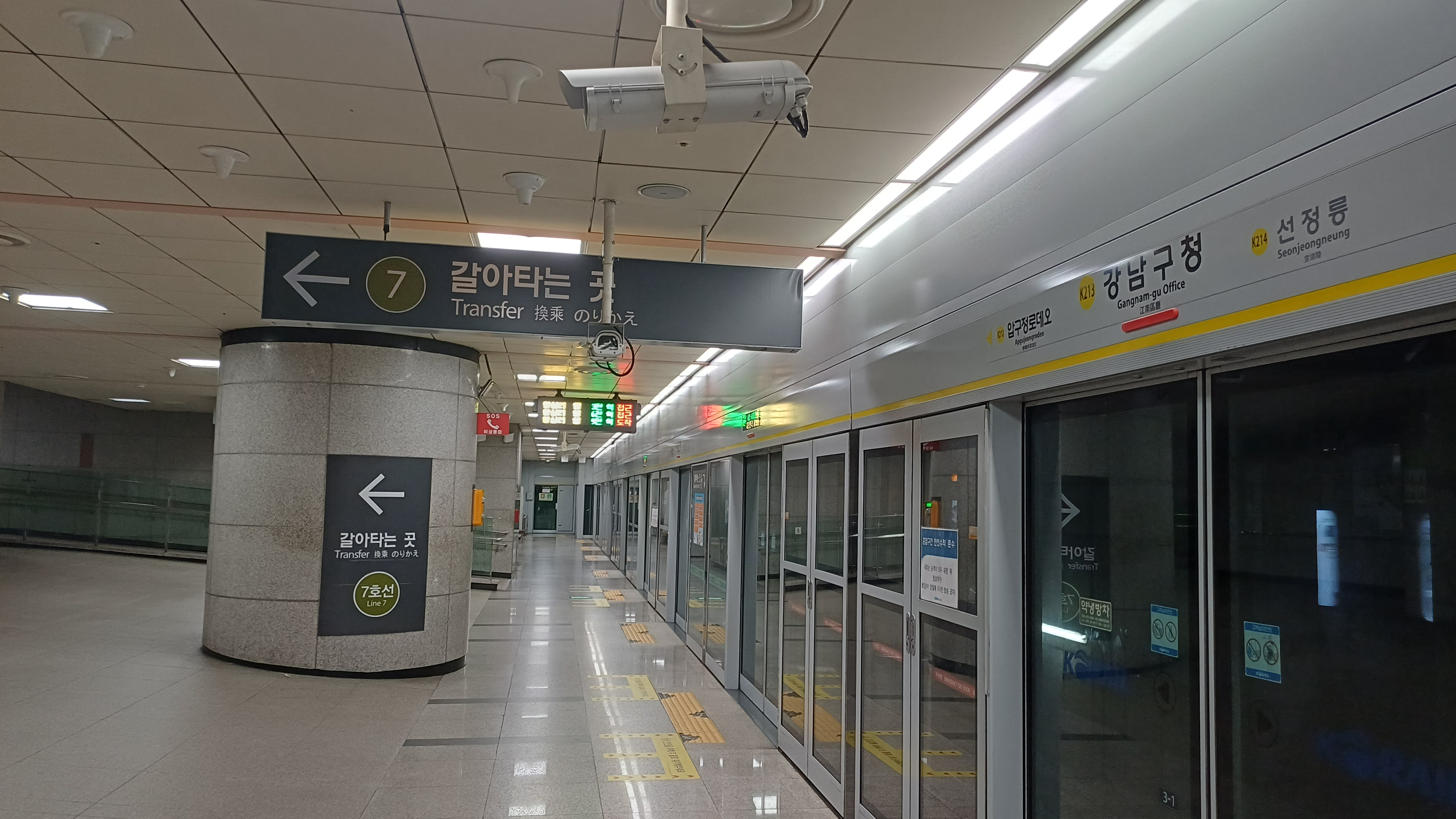
Suin-Bundang Line platform

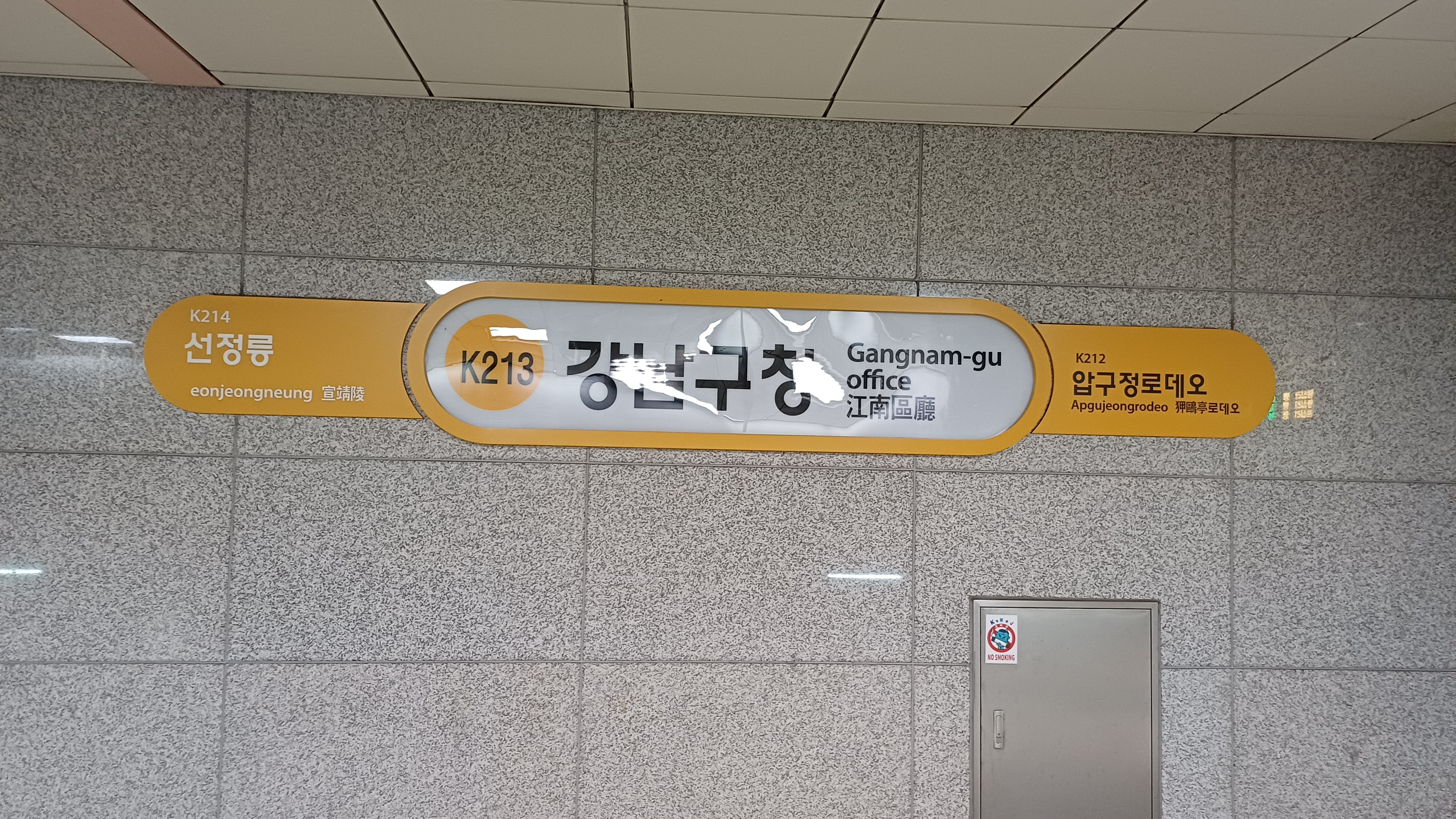
Suin-Bundang Line station nameplate

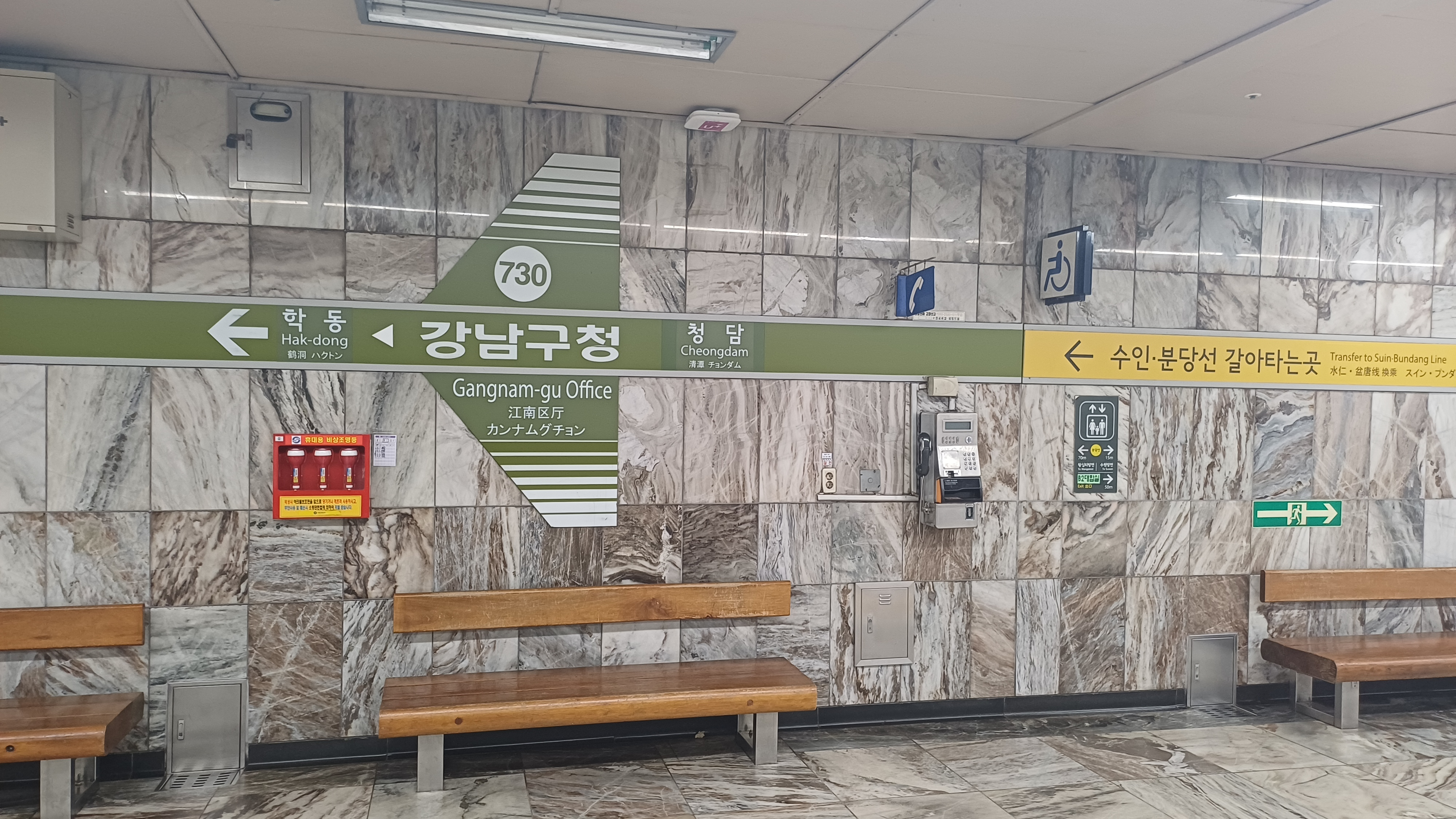
Line 7 station nameplate

== Station layout ==
=== Line 7 ===
Cheongdam ↑
S/B | | N/B
↓ Hak-dong

Southbound	← ● Line 7 toward Seongnam
Northbound	● Line 7 toward Jangam →

=== Suin–Bundang Line ===
↑ Apgujeongrodeo
2 | | 1
Seonjeongneung ↓

1	● Suin–Bundang Line toward Incheon →
2	← ● Suin–Bundang Line toward Cheongnyangni

== Vicinity ==
- Exit 1: Gangnam District Office, Eonju Middle School
- Exit 2: Hakdong Elementary School
- Exit 3: Yeongdong Central Market
- Exit 4: Yeongdong High School

Preceding station	Seoul Metropolitan Subway	Following station
Cheongdam towards Jangam	Line 7	Hak-dong towards Seongnam
Apgujeongrodeo towards Cheongnyangni	Suin–Bundang Line	Seonjeongneung towards Incheon
