= Shinsegae =

South Korean company

Shinsegae Inc.
- Native name: 주식회사 신세계
- Type: Public
- Traded as: KRX: 004170
- Industry: Retail
- Predecessor: Mitsukoshi Keijō (Gyeongseong) Store
- Founded: 9 December 1955; 70 years ago
- Founder: Original store acquired by Lee Byung-chul
- Headquarters: 63 Sogong-ro, Jung District, Seoul, South Korea
- Area served: South Korea
- Key people: Lee Myung-hee (Chairwoman); Chung Yong-jin (Vice Chairman); Cha Jeong-ho (CEO)
- Owner: Estate of Lee Myung-hee (28.56%); National Pension Service (12.16%)
- Parent: Samsung (1955–1997); Independent (1997–present)
- Subsidiaries: E-mart
- Website: www.shinsegae.com

Shinsegae Inc. (Korean: 신세계; Hanja: 新世界; lit. 'new world', KRX: 004170) is a South Korean department store franchise, along with several other businesses, headquartered in Seoul, South Korea. The firm is an affiliate of Shinsegae Group, South Korea's leading retail chaebol, and one of the big three department store firms in Korea, along with Lotte and Hyundai Department Store. Its flagship store in Centum City, Busan, is the world's largest department store at 3,163,000 square feet (293,900 m^{2}), surpassing Macy's flagship Herald Square in New York City in 2009.

Shinsegae was the first credit card company in South Korea. They issued their own charge card from 1967 to 2000. In 2000, Shinsegae sold their credit card division to KorAm Bank, which was later acquired by Citibank Korea.

Shinsegae was originally part of the Samsung Group, from which it separated in the 1990s along with CJ Group (Food/Chemicals/Entertainment), Saehan Group (Electronic Media/Apparel/Textiles), and the Hansol Group (Paper/Telecom). Chairwoman Lee Myung-hee is the fifth daughter of Samsung founder Lee Byung-chul and the aunt of Lee Jae-yong, the executive chairman of Samsung Electronics.

The group owns the brands Shinsegae and E-Mart, and is in direct competition with Lotte Shopping and Hyundai Department Store Group.

== History ==
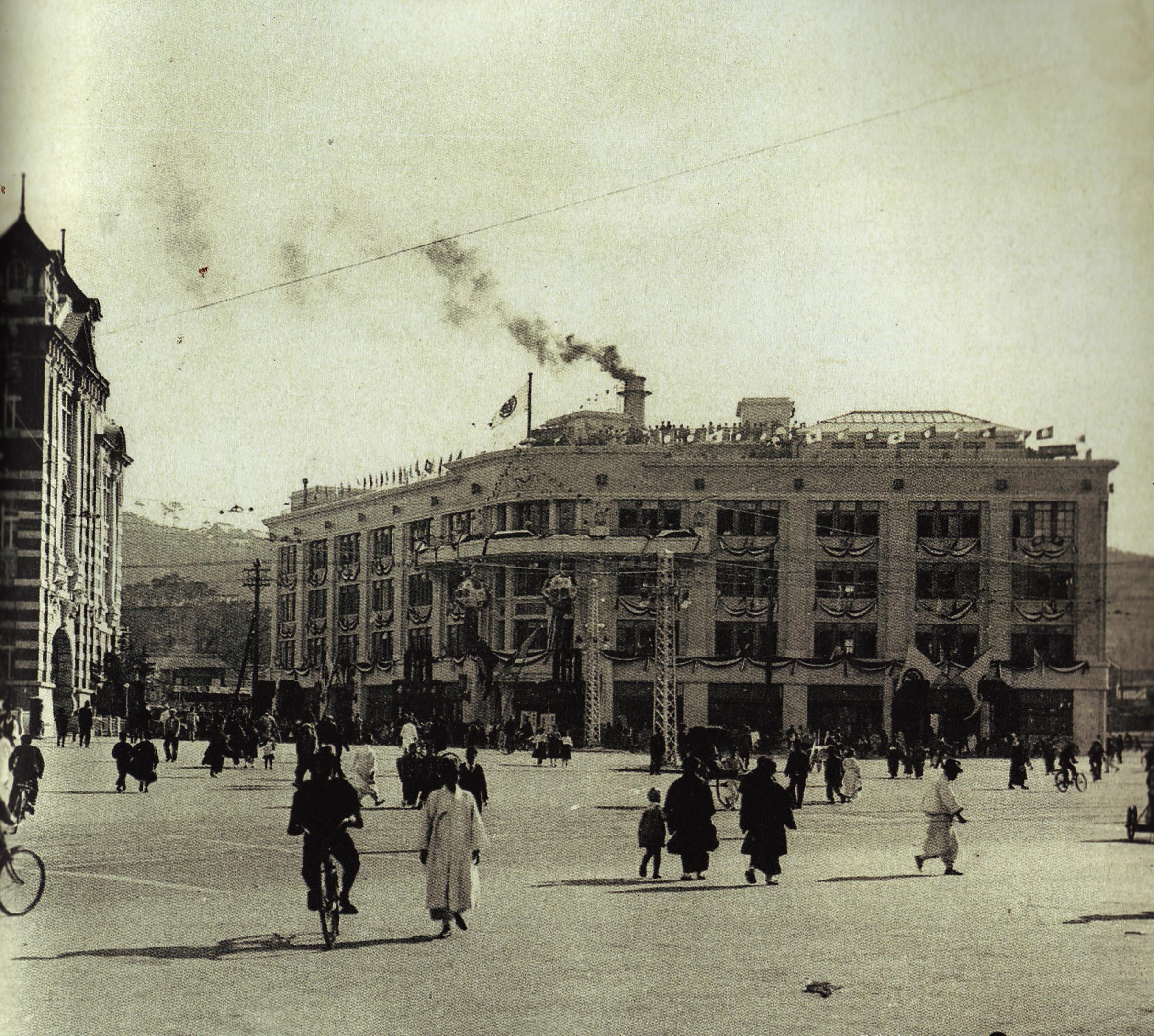
Main store in Seoul in the Japanese Colonial period, when it was a branch of Tokyo's Mitsukoshi

The main branch of Shinsegae is the oldest department store in Korea. It was opened in 1930 as the Gyeongseong branch of Mitsukoshi, a Japanese department store franchise; Korea was occupied by the Japanese Empire at the time. The store was acquired in 1945 by the late founder of Samsung group, Lee Byung-chull, and renamed Donghwa Department Store. After the Korean War (1950–1953) began, it was used for several years as a post exchange by the American army. In 1963, the store was given the name Shinsegae. The old building is currently used as a luxury shopping venue.

In 2021, Shinsegae bought the then-named SK Wyverns of the KBO League from SK and renamed then the SSG Landers. They bought them for 135.2 billion won, (100 billion for the team itself, and 35.2 billion for the team's facilities and properties) equivalent to $112.8 million.

Shinsegae Group will split its department store and supermarket divisions into two separate entities, the retail giant said 30 Oct 2024.

== Daejeon Shinsegae Art & Science (대전신세계 Art & Science) ==
The Daejeon store opened in 2021 is rather unique as it is a combination of department store, to a limited extent a shopping center, together with an art and science-oriented cultural facilities, a hotel and office space.

The 284,224 m^{2} (3,059,360 sq ft), complex, costing 600 billion won (500,000,000 USD), consists of Podium department store area, and EXPO Tower. 88,572 m^{2} (953,380 sq ft) are dedicated to department store sales area.

In May 2026, it exceeded 1 trillion won in annual transactions for the first time since its opening.

=== Podium ===
Podium includes:

- Food Hall in the basement
- Main floor (62,500 sq ft (5,810 m^{2})) housing luxury accessory brands including Fendi, Bottega Veneta, and Saint Laurent as well as jewelry and over 40 beauty brands like Gucci Beauty and Clé de Peau Beauté. According to Jeffrey Hutchison & Associates, the designers, the vision was to create a "Grand Hall inspired by an early modern Italian villa in the spirit of such great Italian architects like Luigi Moretti and Carlo Scarpa" by reinterpreting classic design elements such as vaulted ceilings using bone-white plaster and custom decorative light pendants highlighting the circulation paths. The flooring "reimagines" an Italianate mosaic floor but with a contemporary pattern using contra black and Veneto white marble slabs.
- Second Floor (57,000 sq ft (5,300 m^{2})), selling men's and women's luxury brand fashions, also designed by Hutchison, with the theme "A Contemporary Sculpture Park", inspired by the sculptural works of Barbara Hepworth, Henry Moore, and the cubist works of Georges Braque. The women's area features Nairobi black marble on the floor, bone-white hand plaster sculptural elements on the walls, ceilings, and exaggerated columns to provide an "intimate yet inviting" environment. The men's area was designed to feel "sculptural", "masculine" and contemporary with blonde oak wood walls, a dimensional ceiling, and sequoia brown marble tiles on the floor, accenting asymmetrical patterns of the space.
- Third floor, fashions; Fourth floor: sports, golf, and outdoor; underwear; children's;
- Fifth floor, Verona Street food hall themed as a street in Verona, Italy

=== EXPO Tower ===
The EXPO Tower building, 43 stories and 193 meters high, includes:

  - 171-room hotel on 11 floors
  - The Art Space 193, a 193-metre-high observatory featuring artist Ólafur Elíasson's colourful installation The Living Observatory
  - Shinsegae Nexperium, a science museum focusing on robots, biotechnology, and space, created in collaboration with KAIST research university
  - Daejeon Expo Aquarium, a media art combined aquarium, featuring a 4,200-metric-ton tank filled with approx. 20,000 fish of 250 different species. It combines multimedia art based on the theme of Poseidon, the god of the sea in Greek mythology.

=== Other facilities ===
The complex also includes (it is unclear in which section):

- a Lego Shop
- a Dolby Cinema Megabox 7-screen, 943-seat multicinema
- the Shinsegae Academy with educational content via an online lecture platform and mobile system
- the Shinsegae Gallery, an art exhibition space that attracts numerous customers
- on the 6th floor, a panoramic glass window cabinet gallery & art terrace overlooks Gapcheon
- the Hella fun City Daejeon municipal public relations Center

== Daejeon store (gallery) ==
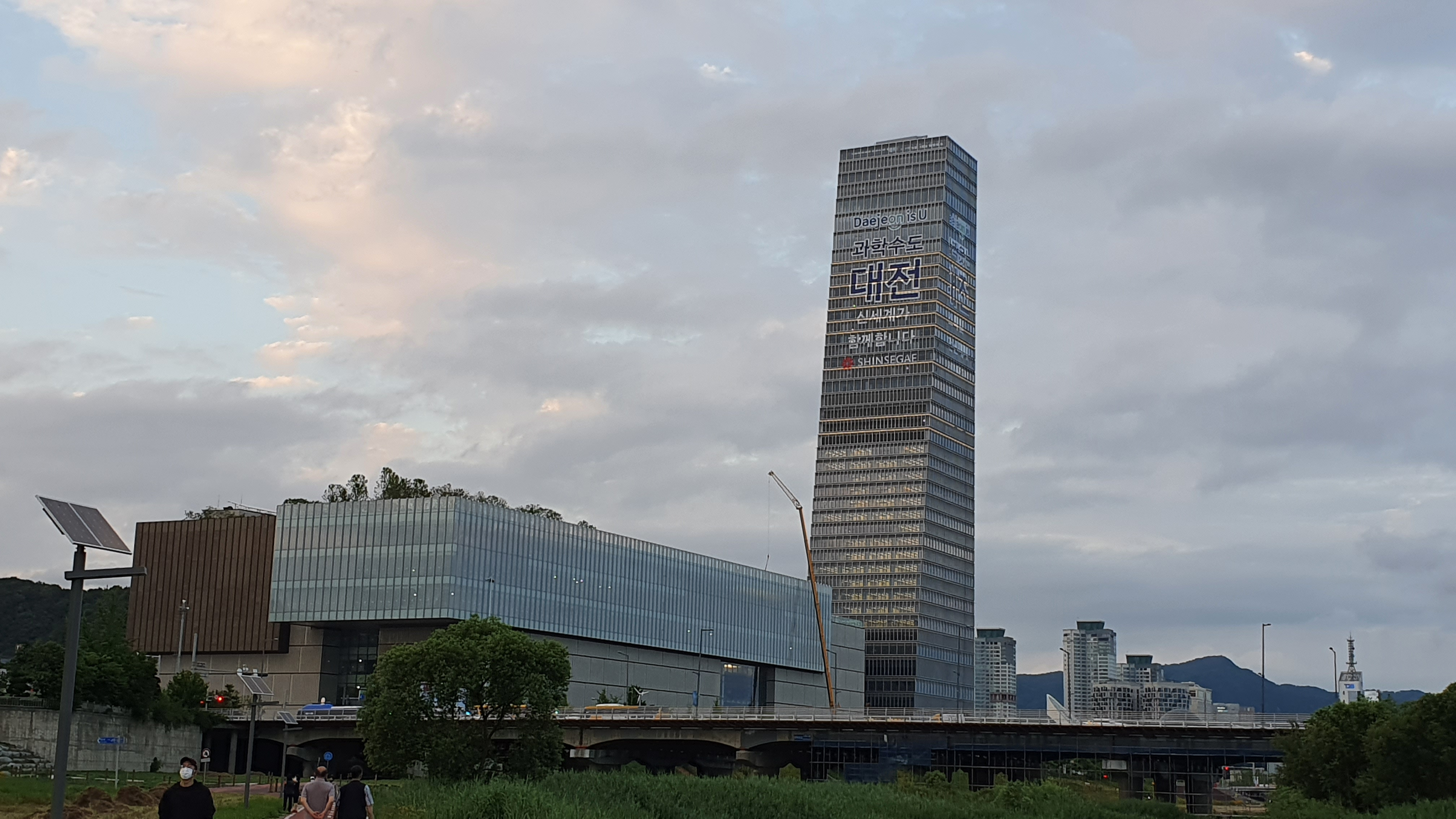

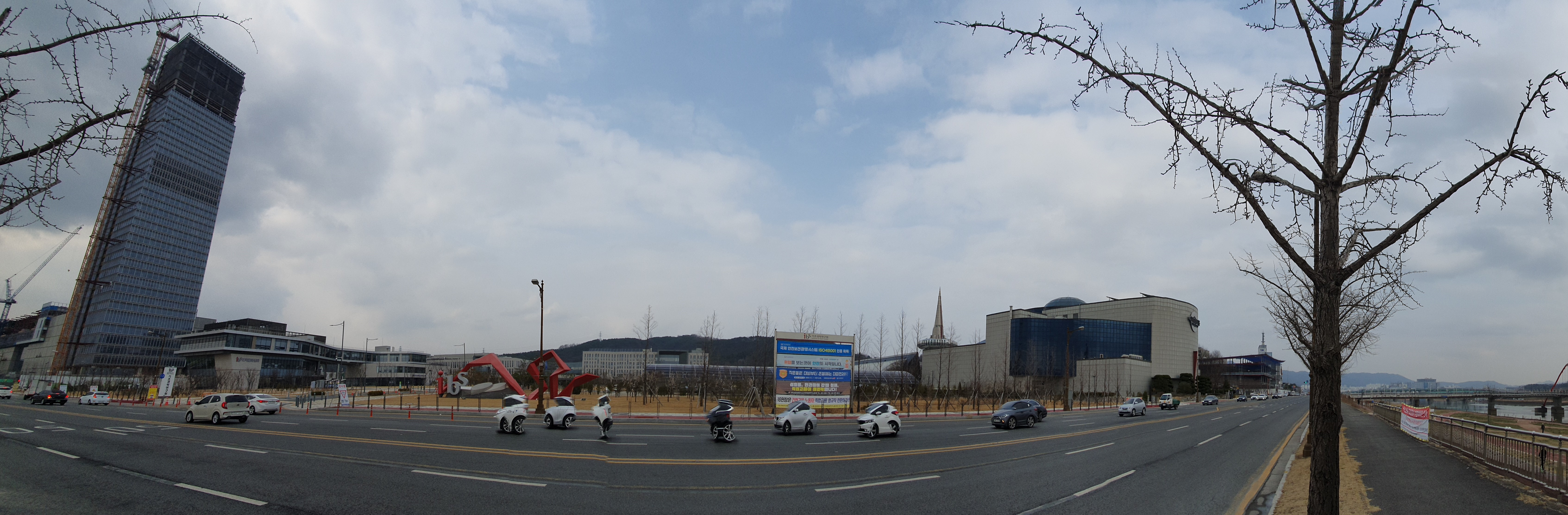

== Centum City store (gallery) ==
Exterior

Lightwell

Sky Garden

== Table of stores ==
Store		Sq m	City	Location / Notes	Photo
English	Korean	Sq m	City	Location / Notes	Photo
Centum City	센텀시티	293,905	Busan	in Centum City, Hae-undae-gu (the world's largest department store)	
Uijeongbu	의정부점	145,000	Uijeongbu	in Gyeonggi Province	
Daejeon Shinsegae Art & Science	대전신세계 Art & Science	88,572 (department store area)	Daejeon	Opened in 2021. 284,224 m^{2} (3,059,360 sq ft) complex - see section in this article, below.	
Myeongdong Main Store	본점 본관, 신관	56,528	Seoul	in Jung-gu. Main Building & New Building.	
Yeongdeungpo	영등포점 A관, B관, 명품관	43,305	Seoul	in Times Square (shopping mall), Yeongdeungpo-gu. Building A, Building B & Luxury Hall.	
Gangnam	강남점 본관, 신관	43,305	Seoul	in Seocho-gu, express bus terminal, flagship with sales of US$1 billion/year, the highest of any Shinsegae store. Main Building & New Building	
Masan	마산점	26,115	Masan	in Happo-gu, Changwon, South Gyeongsang Province	
Gwangju	광주신세계	22,611	Gwangju	in Seo-gu	
Arario Chungcheong	충청점		Cheon-an	in Dongnam-gu, South Chungcheong Province (Through a management alliance with Arario, owner of Yawoori Department Store, Shinsegae opened this branch in Cheon-an in the building once used as Galleria Cheon-an Store and Yawoori Department Store)	
Daegu	대구신세계		Daegu	in Dongdaegu Station Includes 56,000 sq ft (5,200 m^{2}) aquarium. The 1st, 8th and 9th floors house more than 50 different restaurants, while the Food Market is located on the first basement level. Main concentration of restaurants on the 8th floor (Luang Street Food Court) designed as a dimly lit street of Hong Kong in the 1960s.	
Gimhae	김해점		Gimhae	in South Gyeongsang Province	
Gyeonggi (formerly Jukjeon)	경기점		Yong-in	in Suji-gu, Gyeonggi Province (Changed its name from Jukjeon Store on October 26, 2009)	
Hanam	하남점		Hanam	in Gyeonggi Province (Located in Starfield Hanam shopping mall, a joint-venture between Shinsegae and Taubman Centers, which opened on 9 September 2016. Besides Shinsegae, it also features Megabox cinema, Yeongpoong bookstore, Zara, H&M, Hansem, Electromart, emart traders (warehouse style), indoor water park and Eatopia food court as anchor tenant. Many luxury brands like Louis Vuitton, Prada, Gucci and Genesis and BMW CARS as well as Ioniq EV are in the shopping mall.)	

Shinsegae also has a small branch in Incheon International Airport, and a supermarket in Dogok-dong, Gangnam-gu, Seoul.

Shinsegae launched the Shinsegae Style Market, a smaller shopping mall mainly aimed at young customers, in 2010. Despite its name, the mall is managed by Shinsegae's subsidiary E-Mart.

- Seongnam Style Market in E-Mart Taepyeong branch, Seongnam, Gyeonggi Province
- Daejeon Style Market in E-Mart Daejeon Terminal Complex branch, Dong-gu, Daejeon

=== Planned ===
- A fashion mall for youngsters in the building of Mesa, a defunct shopping mall right beside Shinsegae's main store in Jung-gu, Seoul
- Shopping mall at Samsung Town, NW of Seoul new town is under construction

=== Defunct ===
- Daegu Store (대구점) in Jung-gu, Daegu (opened in 1973 and closed in December 1976)
- Shinsegae Store Banpo (신세계 스토어 반포) in Gangnam-gu, Seoul (opened in 1974 and closed several years later)
- Gyeongju Bomun Store (경주보문점) in Gyeongju, North Gyeongsang Province (opened in 1979 and closed several years later)
- Dongbang Plaza Store (동방플라자) in Jung-gu, Seoul (opened in 1982 and closed in 1996)
- Cheonho Store (천호점) in Gangdong-gu, Seoul (closed in 2000, converted into E-Mart Cheonho Store)
- Mia Store (미아점) in Seongbuk-gu, Seoul (closed in 2007, converted into E-Mart Mia Store)

== Discount store ==
E-Mart (Korean: 이마트) is a subsidiary of Shinsegae and a large discount store chain founded in South Korea, having stores in China, Korea and Mongolia. Domestically, E-Mart is the biggest discount store chain followed by Home Plus, and Lotte Mart.

In late May 2006, Shinsegae revealed plans to buy all 16 of the Wal-Mart stores in Korea. All of the country's Wal-Mart outlets were re-branded as E-Mart in October 2006. Wal-Mart exited the Korean market soon after.

Shinsegae spun off its E-Mart department into a separate corporation (KRX: 139480) in 2012. The shopping mall was acquired by E-Mart in January 2014.

== Online mall ==
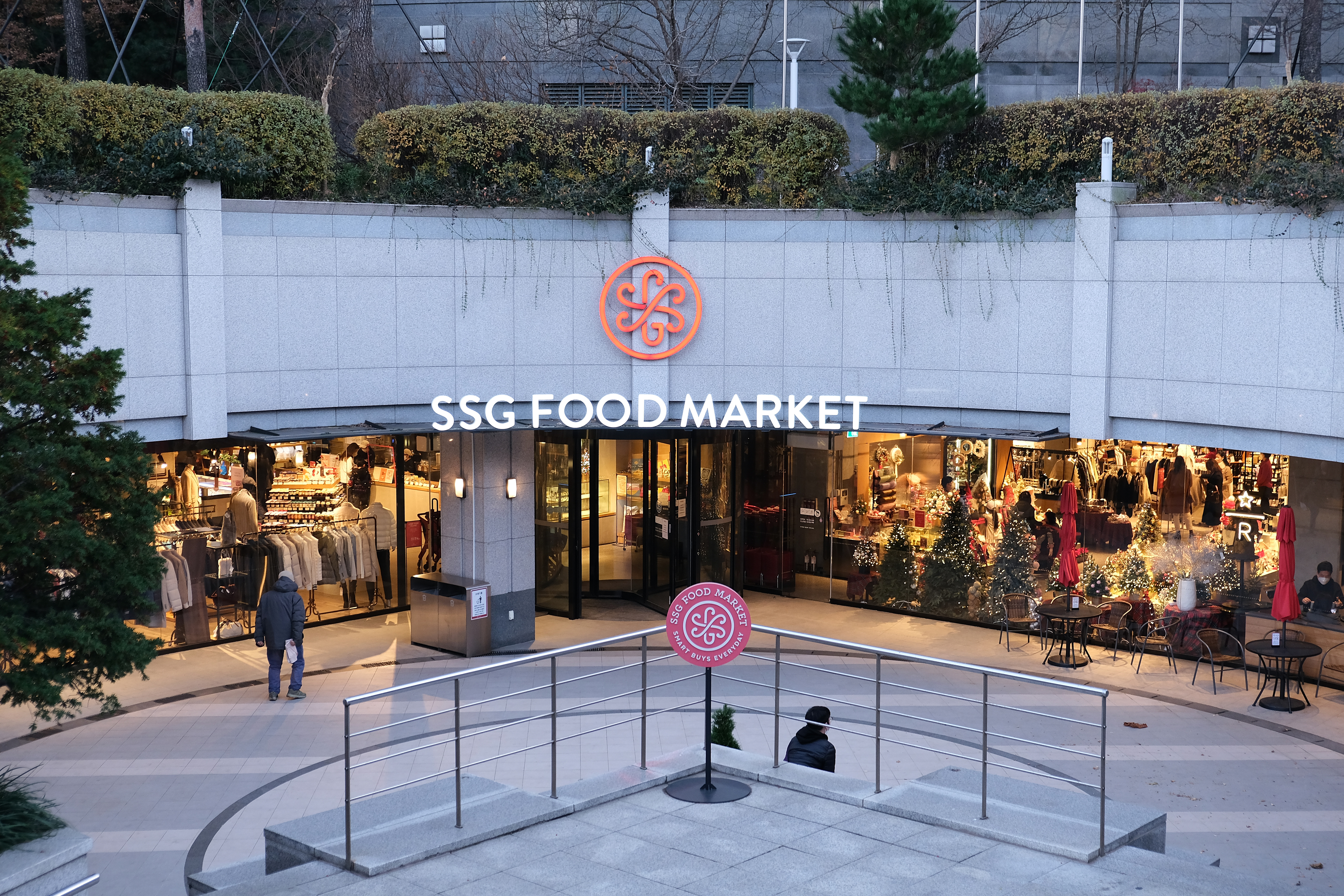
SSG Food Market, Gangnam

SSG (usually read as "쓱") is an online shopping mall operated by Shinsegae in 2014. Through this shopping mall, products from Shinsegae affiliates (Shinsegae Department Store, E-Mart, Casamia, CHICOR, etc.) can be shopped online.

== Subsidiaries ==
- Central City
- E-Mart
  - Gmarket Global (joint venture with eBay)
    - Auction Co.
    - G9
    - G-Market
- Gwangju Shinsegae
- Seoul Express Bus Terminal
- Shafer Vineyards
- Shinsegae I&C
- Shinsegae Chelsea
- Shinsegae Construction
- Shinsegae Dongdaegu CTC (Shinsehae Daegu)
- Shinsegae Food System
  - No Brand Burger
- Shinsegae International
- Starbucks Coffee Korea
- Johnny Rockets
- Josun Hotel & Resort
- Emart24
- Casamia
- Mindmark
  - SILKWOOD
  - Studio 329
- CHICOR

== Controversies ==
Shinsegae banned commercial images of actress Go Hyun-jung (고현정) from their department stores following her divorce from vice chairman and former CEO Chung Yong-jin.

In 2026, Starbucks Korea, operated in South Korea by Shinsegae Group, launched a promotion for “Tank Day” coffee tumblers. The campaign drew criticism for perceived references to the 1980 Gwangju Uprising and the 1987 torture death of student activist Park Jong-chul, prompting nationwide boycotts and protests. South Korean president Lee Jae-myung criticized the promotion on X, saying it insulted the victims and residents of Gwangju. Starbucks Korea apologized, and CEO Son Jeong-hyun was dismissed. The company also announced plans to close all stores in South Korea for half a day on 22 June so employees could attend a history education session intended to improve historical awareness and social sensitivity.

== See also ==
- Hyundai Department Store Group
- Homeplus
