= Hyundai Department Store Group =

South Korean retail conglomerate

- Industry: Retail
- Founded: 1971; 55 years ago
- Headquarters: Seoul, South Korea
- Brands: Handsome Hyundai Green Food; Hyundai Livart; Hyundai L&C; Hyundai Rental Care; Hyundai Dream Tour; Hyundai Ezwel; Hyundai Everdigm Hyundai Bioland
- Website: www.ehyundai.com

Hyundai Department Store Group (Korean: 현대백화점그룹) is a South Korean retail conglomerate that spun off from Hyundai Group in 1999. The company began as Keumgang Development Industries established in 1971. It opened its first store in Ulsan in 1977. The flagship store, in the affluent Seoul neighborhood of Apgujeong, was opened in 1985. Its major competitors are Lotte Department Store, Shinsegae, Hanwha Galleria, NC Department Store etc.

== Group families ==
- Hyundai Department Store
- Hyundai Department Store Duty Free
- Hyundai Home Shopping
- Handsome
- Hyundai Green Food Seoul
- Hyundai Livart
- Hyundai L&C
- Hyundai Rental Care
- Hyundai Dream Tour
- Hyundai Ezwel
- Hyundai Everdigm
- Hyundai Bioland

== See also ==
- Chaebol
- List of South Korean retailers
- Economy of South Korea
- List of South Korean companies
