= Cinemax (disambiguation) =

Cinemax is an American pay television, cable, and satellite television network, owned by a subsidiary of Warner Bros. Discovery.

Cinemax may also refer to:

- CineMAX, an Indian cinema chain
- Cinemax (Asian TV channel), an Asian pay TV channel, part of the HBO Asia network
- Cinemax (video game developer), an independent Czech video game developer and publisher
- Cinemax Studios, former name of GMA Pictures

== See also ==
- Avni Cinemax, an Indian film production and distribution company
- CinemaxX, a cinema chain in Germany and Denmark, owned by Vue International
- Cinemaxx (Indonesia), a cinema chain, owned by Cinépolis since 2019
- Cinemaximum, a cinema chain in Turkey
