= Apgujeong station =

Station of the Seoul Metropolitan Subway

압구정 (현대백화점); Apgujeong (Hyundai Department Store)
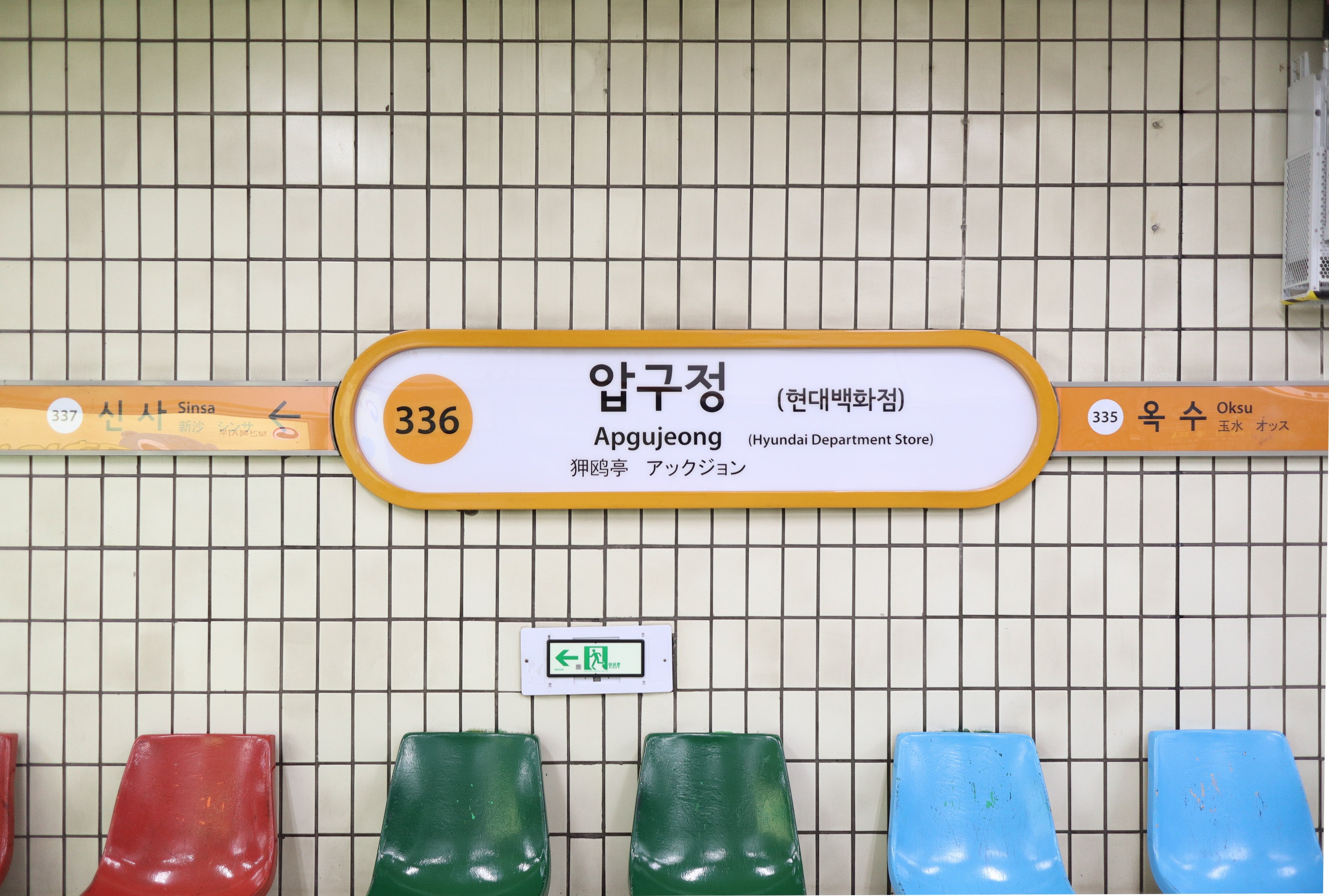
- Station nameplate (April 2022)

Korean name
- Hangul: 압구정역
- Hanja: 狎鷗亭驛
- RR: Apgujeong-yeok
- MR: Apkujŏng-yŏk

General information
- Location: 435 Apgujeong-dong, 172 Apgujeongno Jiha, Gangnam-gu, Seoul
- Coordinates: 37°31′39″N 127°01′42″E
- Operator: Seoul Metro
- Line: Line 3
- Platforms: 2
- Tracks: 2

Construction
- Structure type: Underground

Key dates
- October 18, 1985: Line 3 opened

Passengers
- (Daily) Based on Jan-Dec of 2012. Line 3: 89,424
Location

Apgujeong (Korean pronunciation: [apk͈udʑʌŋ]) is a rapid transit station on Seoul Subway Line 3. It is located in Apgujeong-dong, Gangnam District, Seoul. It has a pair of underground side platforms. The station has connections to 15 buses through 6 exits. It services Sinsa-dong and Apgujeong-dong. The area is named after a pavilion frequented by Han Myŏnghoe, whose pen-name was Apgujeong, and its sub-name comes from the nearby flagship Apgujeong Main store of Hyundai Department Store.

== Station layout ==
G	Street level	Exit

L1; Concourse	Lobby	Customer Service, Shops, Vending machines, ATMs

L2; Platform	Side platform, doors will open on the right
L2; Platform	Northbound	← Line 3 toward Daehwa (Oksu)
L2; Platform	Southbound	Line 3 toward Ogeum (Sinsa) →
L2; Platform	Side platform, doors will open on the right

== Average daily ridership ==
Line	Passengers								
Line	2000	2001	2002	2003	2004	2005	2006	2007	2008
3	43165	41972	42239	40299	41894	41351	40649	40494	40219

Preceding station	Seoul Metropolitan Subway	Following station
Oksu towards Daehwa	Line 3	Sinsa towards Ogeum
