= Seoul Forest =

Park in Seoul, South Korea

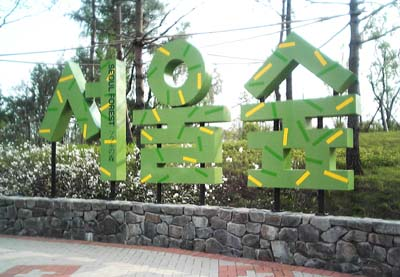
- Seoul Forest
- Interactive map of Seoul Forest
- Location: Ttukseom-ro, Seongdong District, Seoul, South Korea
- Coordinates: 37°32′40.65″N 127°2′23.44″E
- Area: 1,200 ha (3,000 acres)
- Established: June 18, 2005

Korean name
- Hangul: 서울숲
- RR: Seoul sup
- MR: Sŏul sup

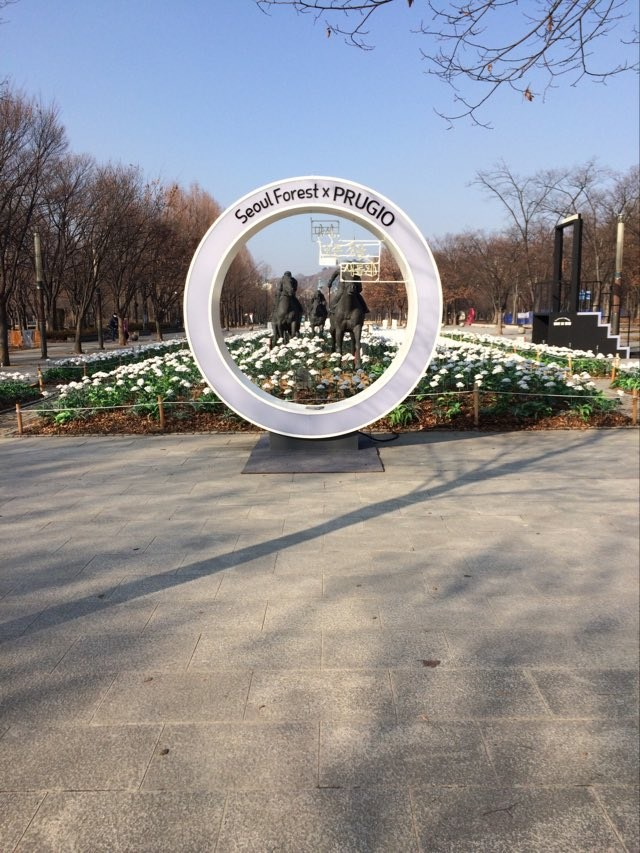
One of the entrances to Seoul Forest.

Seoul Forest (Korean: 서울숲) is a large park in Seongdong District, Seoul, South Korea. It is open year-round, and admission is free. Seoul Forest opened in June 2005. The city government spent 235.2 billion won in development. It is the third largest park in Seoul. Seoul Forest is a massive park dotted with over 420,000 trees and 100 different animals. This nature park is located in Seongsu-dong and covers an area of 1,200 ha (3,000 acres).

== Description ==
This Ecologic Park has over 40 different species of roses. This park also has fish. There are also many wetland plant species, including reeds, silver banner grass, and rose-gold pussy willows. There are different types of water plants, such as water chestnut and floating moss. Along with these sights, Seoul Forest also features as an insect garden and outdoor nature classroom for children in its Wetlands Ecological Field.

=== Amenities ===
- Cultural Art Park (220,000 m^{2} or 54 acres)
- Hangang River Waterside Park (33,000 m^{2} or 8.2 acres)
- Experiential Learning Park (85,000 m^{2} or 21 acres)
- Marsh Plants Garden (70,000 m^{2} or 17 acres)
- Ecological Forest (165,000 m^{2} or 41 acres): It opens every 5:30~21:30
- An insect botanical garden: It opens every 10:00~17:00 (Closed every Monday)
- Butterfly Garden: It opens every 10:00~17:00 (Closed every Monday)

== History ==
It was once a royal hunting forest, and later became Seoul's first water purification plant in 1908. In the 1940s, its surrounding area was used as an amusement park. In 1954, a race course was built in the park. In 2004, construction began to convert the park into a forest; this completed in June 2005.

Since August 2017, Seongdong District has implemented a policy to restrict entry to large companies and franchise companies in the area of Seoul Forest Road in Seongsu-dong. Seongdong District restricted the entry of large companies, franchise headquarters, or franchise-type rest restaurants (large coffee shops), general restaurants (large buffet restaurants), bakeries, and cosmetics stores in Seongsu 1-ga 2-dong. Such measures were based on the district unit plan around Ttukseom Island and the ordinance on the designation of local community cooperation and sustainable development zones, and Seongdong District is the first to restrict entry to district unit plans and ordinances outside of central Seoul.

== Transport ==
The park is served by Seoul Subway Line 2, Ttukseom station, exit 8 or Bundang Line, Seoul-forest station, exit 3. Buses are also widely available.
