= Ciné de Chef =

Theater and restaurant in Seoul

Coordinates: 37°31′28″N 127°01′46″E

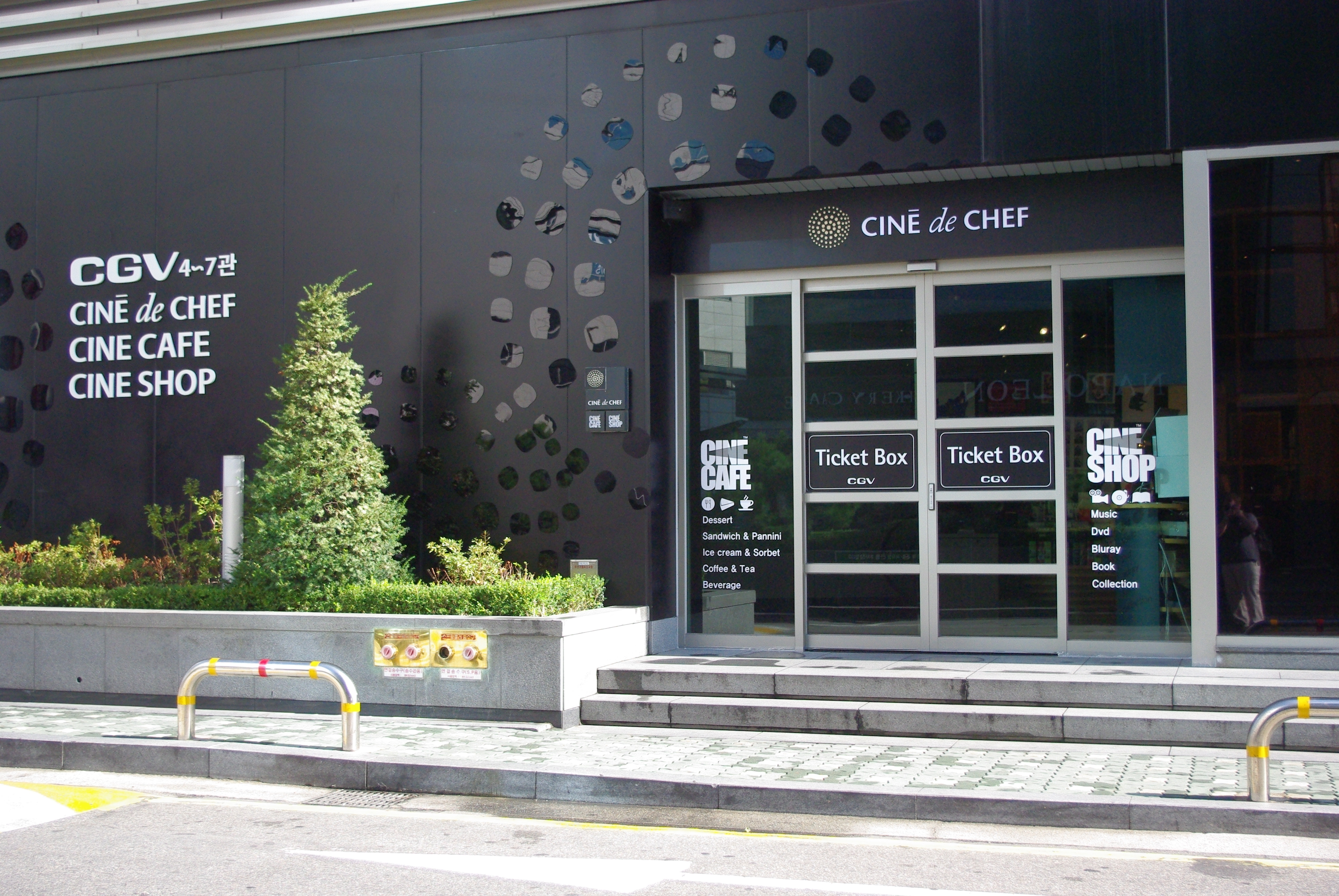
- The main entrance of Ciné de Chef in Apgujeong-dong
- Interactive map of Ciné de Chef

Restaurant information
- Established: 3 May 2007
- Owner: CJ CGV
- Location: Seoul, South Korea
- Website: http://www.cinedechef.co.kr/

Ciné de Chef is a combined luxury movie theatre and gourmet restaurant, located in Apgujeong, southern Seoul. It is operated by CJ CGV, South Korea's largest multiplex movie theatre chain, and opened on 3 May 2007, drawing over 2000 viewers in its first few months.

The theatre seats just thirty people in deluxe chairs costing ₩8 million each, and is equipped with 11.1 channel speakers which surround the entire theatre, including the floor and ceiling. In the restaurant, Le Cordon Bleu-certified chefs serve modern Asian cuisine. Other services provided by Ciné de Chef include valet parking, a private elevator, an escort service and English-speaking staff. Tickets cost in the region of ₩60,000–100,000.
