= Apgujeong-dong =

Neighbourhood in Seoul, South Korea

Coordinates: 37.531°N 127.031°E

- Apgujeong, Seoul

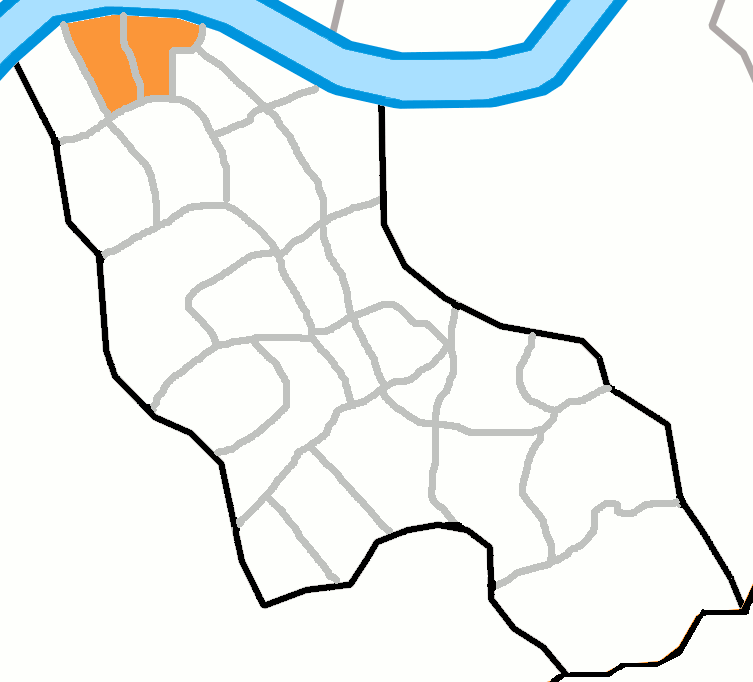
- Country: South Korea
- Special City: Seoul
- District: Gangnam

Area
  - Total: 2.53 km^{2} (0.98 sq mi)

Population (2025)
  - Total: 25,513
  - Density: 10,400/km^{2} (27,000/sq mi)

Korean name
- Hangul: 압구정동
- Hanja: 狎鷗亭洞
- RR: Apgujeong-dong
- MR: Apkujŏng-dong

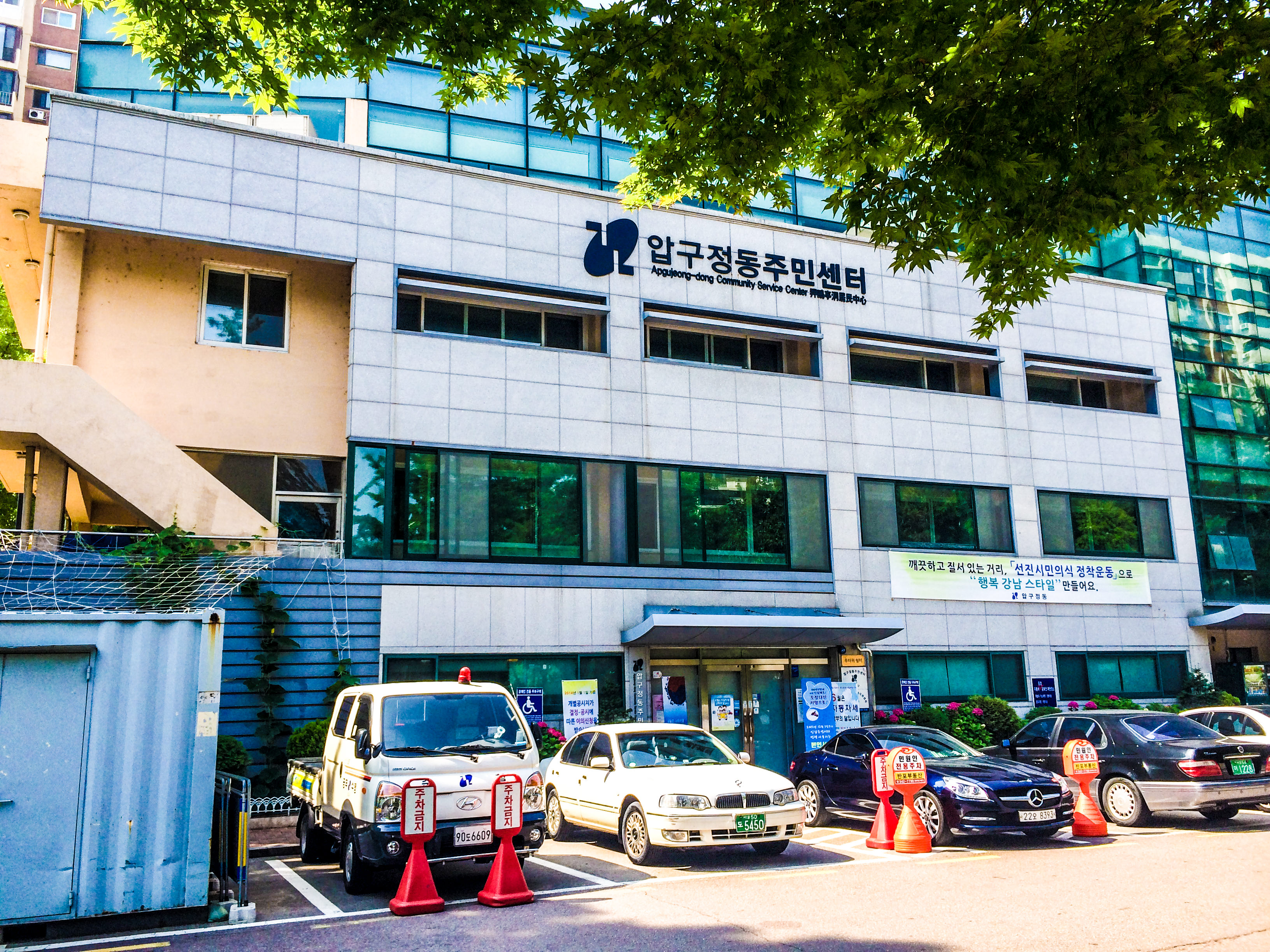
Apgujeong-dong Community Service Center

Apgujeong-dong (Korean: 압구정동; Korean pronunciation: [apk͈udʑʌŋdoŋ]) is a ward of Gangnam District, Seoul, South Korea. It is considered one of the wealthiest neighborhoods in the country. It was reported that housing price of Apgujeong-dong is approximately US$28,300 per one square meter by Korea Ministry of Land, Infrastructure and Transport in 2019.

The Apgujeong originates from a pavilion with the same name founded by Han Myŏnghoe, a 15th-century high-ranking government official during the Joseon period. It is an upmarket residential, fashion, shopping, and educational area. The Hanja name translates into "Seagull Pavilion," a reference to his nickname, which itself was a reference and a mark of peace when viewing a group of seagulls flying.

One of the main shopping area is Apgujeong Rodeo Street, along with Cheongdam-dong Fashion Street in Cheongdam-dong and Garosu-gil in Sinsa-dong, which are connected by the main avenue Apgujeong-ro. It is seen as a fashionable and trendsetting destination.

== Characteristics ==
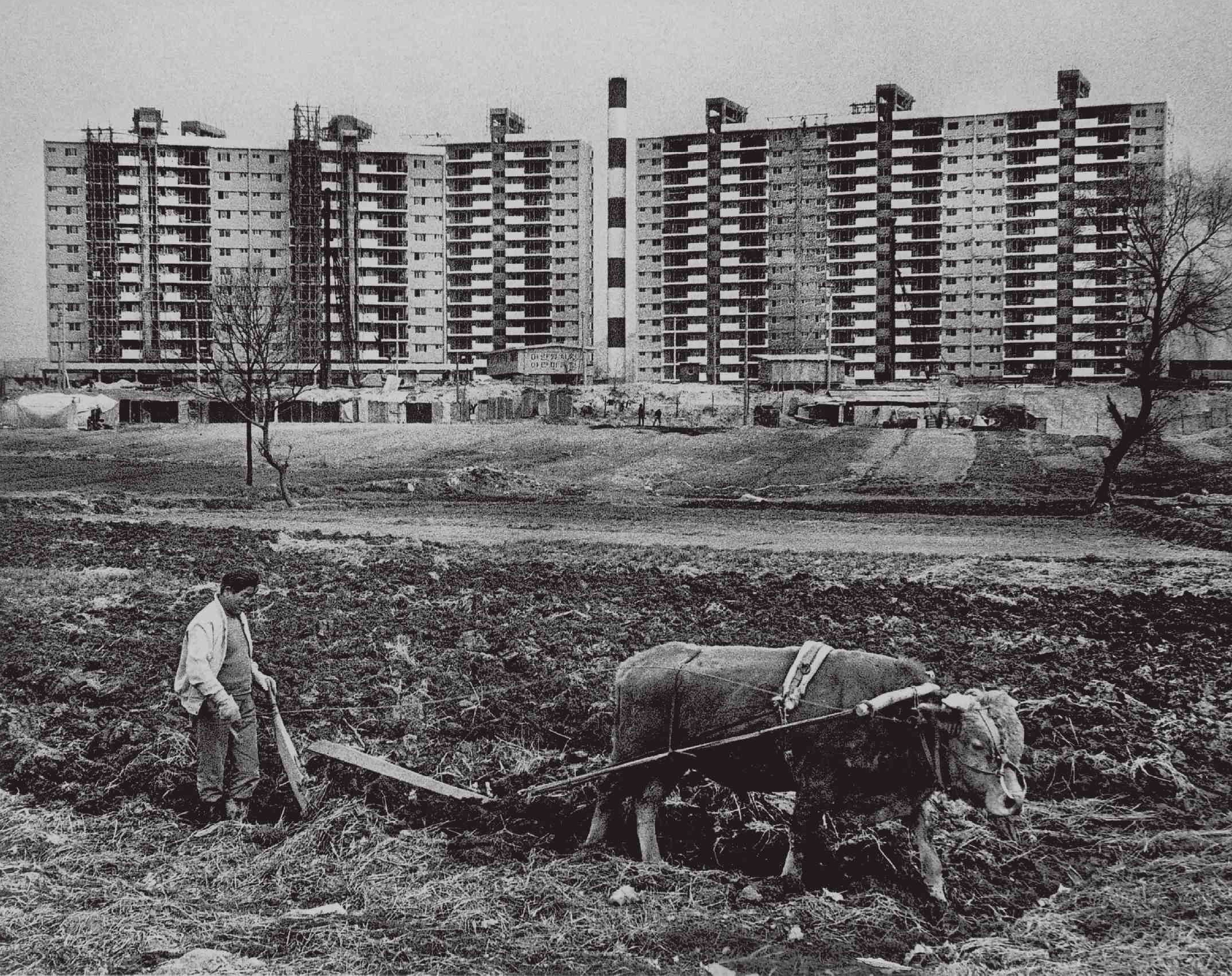
Apgujeong-dong in 1978

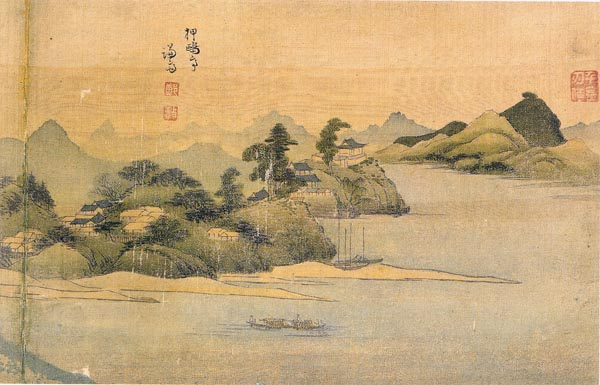
View of Apgujeong-dong drawn by Jeong Seon in the early 18th century

The area is filled with upscale department stores, shops, boutiques, hagwons, cafes and restaurants. Two main department stores, Hyundai Department Store and Galleria Department Store, are located in this area with both being Flagship Stores.

Apgujeong Rodeo Street is located opposite the Galleria Department Store, with shops of local and international designers as well as Nori Market, The Vanessa Bruno outlet, Mui Mui Cafe, and On Friday Restaurant.

The original headquarters and celebrity center of K-pop entertainment agency SM Entertainment was located on the eastern side of Apgujeong-dong, before the company relocated its corporate headquarters to Seongsu-dong, Seongdong-gu in 2021.

The Caffè Pascucci coffee chain in Apgujeong was used as one of the main filming locations for Seoul Broadcasting System's 2001 drama Beautiful Days, starring Lee Byung-hun, Choi Ji-woo, Ryu Si-won, Shin Min-a, Lee Jung-hyun and Lee Yoo-jin.

This area is also known for its many plastic surgery clinics.

== Education ==
- Apgujeong Elementary School
- Apgujeong Middle School
- Sinsa Middle School
- Shingu Middle School

== Transport ==
It is served by Apgujeong station on Seoul Subway Line 3, as well as Sinsa station, which is a transfer station between Line 3 and the Shinbundang Line. On the eastern boundary bordering Cheongdam-dong, the area is also served by Apgujeongrodeo station on the Suin–Bundang Line.

== See also ==
- List of shopping streets and districts by city
- Dong of Gangnam District
- Cine de Chef
- Apgujeong Hyundai Apartment
