= Homeplus =

South Korean discount store chain

Homeplus Co., Ltd
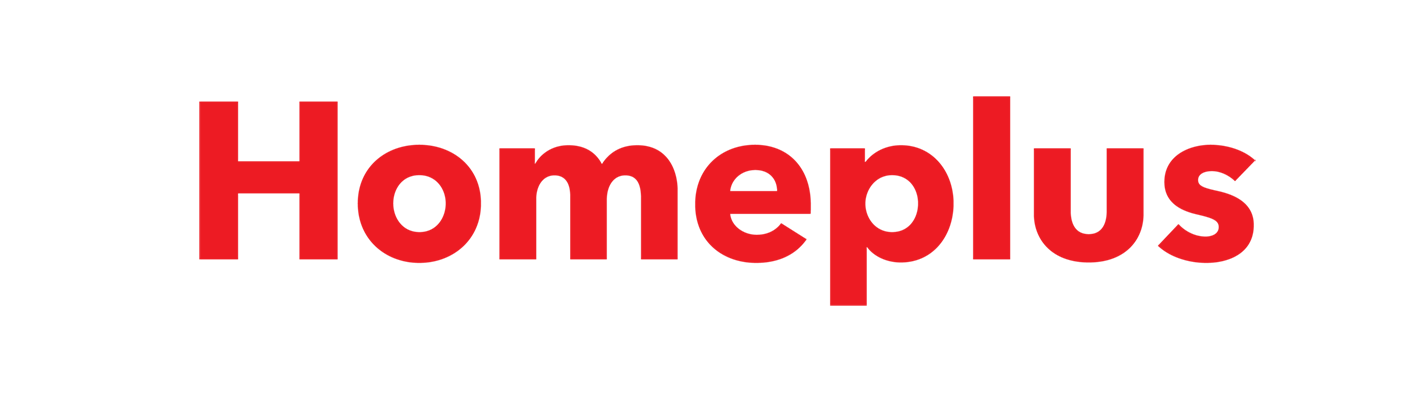
- Type: Private
- Industry: Retailing
- Founded: 1997
- Headquarters: Seoul, South Korea
- Number of locations: Hypermarkets: 142; Homeplus Express: 333 (as of Nov 2021); 365 Plus: 331 (as of the end of 2017)
- Products: Groceries, consumer goods
- Website: www.homeplus.co.kr (in Korean)

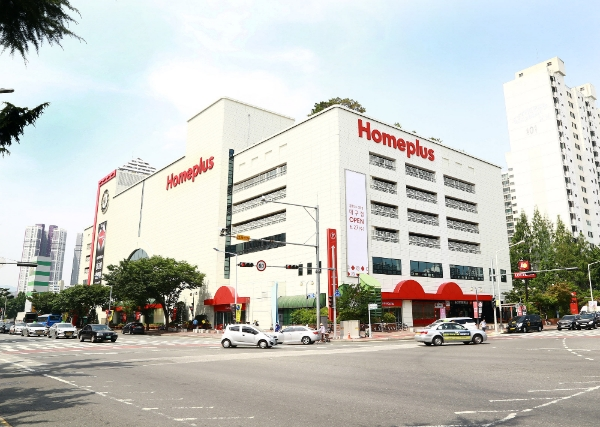
The 1st Homeplus Special stores in Daegu, Korea

Homeplus (Korean: 홈플러스) is a Korean discount store retail chain running about 140 branches with 25,000 employees throughout South Korea. Homeplus is the second largest retailer in South Korea, behind Shinsegae Group's e-mart chain.

Homeplus operates its hypermarkets, super market chain 'Homeplus Express', convenience store '365 Plus' and online shopping service. Homeplus stores offer everything from groceries to clothes and appliances.

It is Headquartered in Gangseo-gu, Seoul, South Korea in 2024, it operates a total of 127 hypermarkets and 413 Expresses nationwide.

Starting in 1997 with distribution business department of Samsung C&T Corporation, Homeplus opened its first hypermarket in Daegu and its second branch in West Busan. In 1999, a joint venture between Samsung C&T and worldwide British retail chain Tesco, ‘SamsungTesco’ was launched, and it has grown into the second largest retailer in Korea by taking over 33 Homever (ex-Carrefour) stores since 2008. On March 1, 2011, due to the expiration of the mutual use contract with the Samsung Group, the corporate name was changed from Samsung Tesco Co., Ltd. to Homeplus Co., Ltd. And on November 22, 2011, the first store of Homeplus 365, a convenience store brand, was opened.

== 2015 acquisition and financial troubles ==
In September 2015 the company was sold to MBK Partners, a South Korean buyout firm, which partnered with the Canada Pension Plan Investment Board and Singapore's Temasek Holdings in a transaction worth £4.2 billion.

To reduce the debt incurred during the acquisition, MBK sold and leased back its assets, burdening Homeplus with rising lease payments in addition to interest costs.

In March 2025, Homeplus filed for corporate rehabilitation with the Seoul Bankruptcy Court after a series of credit rating downgrades. South Korean prosecutors subsequently sought arrest warrants for MBK Chairman Michael ByungJu Kim and three other executives on charges of fraud and violation of the Capital Markets Act in connection with the sale of short-term bonds prior to the filing.

On early July 2025, the Court terminated Homeplus's rehabilitation proposal after it failed to secure at least 200 billion won in rescue financing necessary for the proposal. Starting on July 13, 2026, All stores nationwide temporarily suspended operations.

On July 16, 2026, Meritz Financial Group stepped in to provide 200 billion won in emergency operating funds.

On August 13, 2026, 67 stores reopened.

== Homever ==
Homever (Korean: 홈에버) was a brand name of a hypermarket of E.Land Retail Limited, which is part of the E.Land Group. E.Land Group, the largest operators specializing in fashion and retail business, production and retail corporations in Korea acquired Korean operations of Carrefour in September 2006 to expand the Group's retail presence in Korea. After the acquisition, Carrefour Korea was renamed to Homever. Homever operated 36 hypermarkets with a combined sales area of approximately 112,366 pyung which translates to 371,458 sqm.

Homever was acquired by Tesco in 2008 and all Homever hypermarkets were re-branded as Homeplus.

== See also ==
- E-mart
- Lotte Mart
- Shinsegae
- Costco
