= Seongsu-dong =

Neighborhood of Seoul, South Korea

- Yeonmujang Street in Seongsu-dong
- Interactive map of Seongsu-dong
- Coordinates: 37°32′39″N 127°02′58″E
- Country: South Korea

Area
  - Total: 5.08 km^{2} (1.96 sq mi)

Population (2001)
  - Total: 72,489
  - Density: 14,300/km^{2} (37,000/sq mi)

Korean name
- Hangul: 성수동
- Hanja: 聖水洞
- RR: Seongsu-dong
- MR: Sŏngsu-dong

Seongsu-dong (Korean: 성수동) is a dong, or neighbourhood, of Seongdong District, Seoul, South Korea. It is further subdivided into Seongsu-dong 1-ga and Seongsu-dong 2-ga, and is served by Ttukseom Station and Seongsu Station on Seoul Subway Line 2 and by Seoul Forest Station on the Suin-Bundang Line. Its most notable attraction is Seoul Forest, a public park. The neighborhood has become popular in recent years for its array of cafes and restaurants, many of which have been set up in repurposed factories and old residential buildings, earning it the nickname "The Brooklyn of Seoul". There are also various stores built inside repurposed shipping containers, such as Common Ground. Seongsu-dong is a semi-industrial area with small factories adjacent to the Han River and Jungnangcheon Stream, and has developed into a major commercial and transportation hub following the opening of Seoul Forest and Seoul Forest station on the Suin-Bundang Line.

Since the 2020s, pop-up stores have become increasingly popular in South Korea, and Seongsu-dong has hosted a concentratration of ephemeral retail, including for luxury brands like Louis Vuitton, Chanel, and Dior.

Canadian coffee brand Tim Horton announced that it will build its first ever global flagship store in Seongsu-dong.

H&M store in Seongsu-dong

== See also ==
- Administrative divisions of South Korea
