= Apgujeongrodeo station =

Station of the Seoul Metropolitan Subway

압구정로데오; Apgujeongrodeo
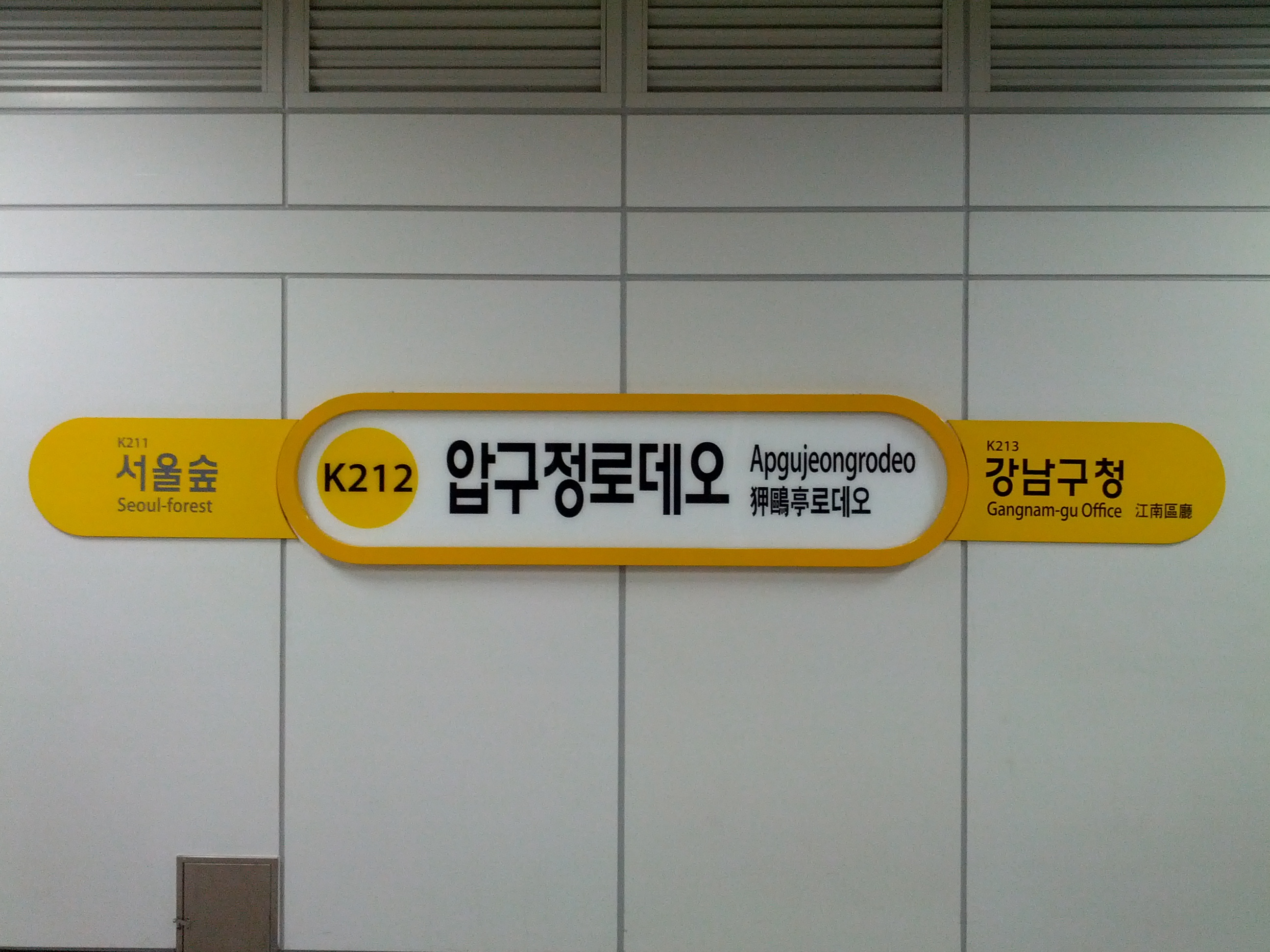

Korean name
- Hangul: 압구정로데오역
- Hanja: 狎鷗亭로데오驛
- Revised Romanization: Apgujeongrodeo-yeok
- McCune–Reischauer: Apgujŏngrodeo-yŏk

General information
- Location: under 402 Apgujeongro, Gangnam-gu, Seoul
- Coordinates: 37.52763°N 127.04063°E
- Operator: Korail
- Line: Suin–Bundang Line
- Platforms: 2
- Tracks: 2

Construction
- Structure type: Underground

Key dates
- October 6, 2012: Suin–Bundang Line opened
Location

Apgujeongrodeo is a station on the Suin–Bundang Line, a commuter rail line of Korail.

From May to July 2013, the station hosted the 2PM G+Star Zone exhibition featuring boyband 2PM as part of the G+Dream Project by Gangnam-gu Office for disadvantaged youth.

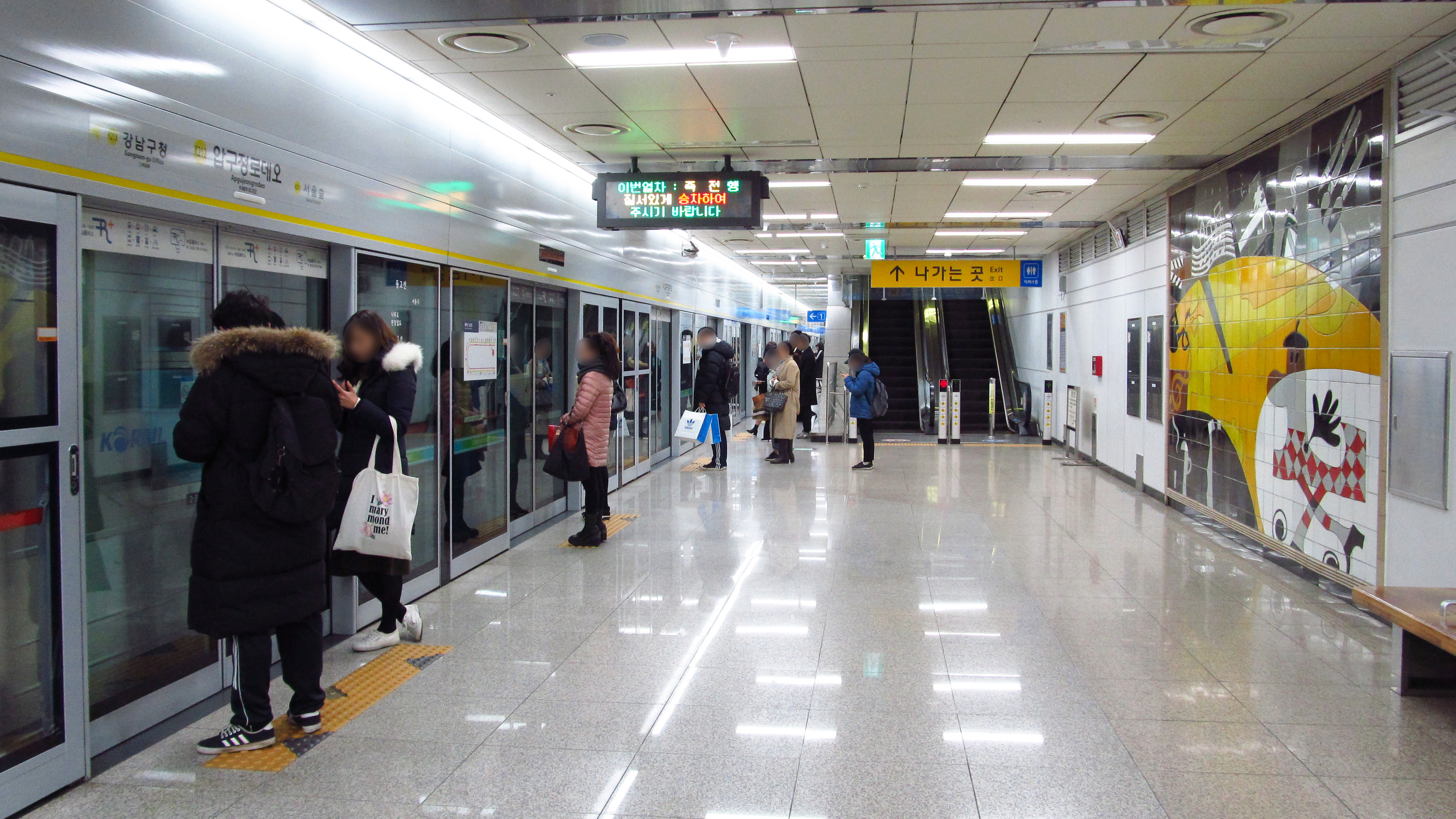

== Vicinity ==
Galleria Department Store Luxury hall has a direct underground link with the station. The 760-meter-long section of main street Apgujeong-ro, that runs from this station at Galleria Department Store to Cheongdam crossroad, has been dubbed "Cheongdam Fashion Street" or "Cheongdamdong Street of Luxury Goods." It is lined with stores of luxury brands, such as Ermenegildo Zegna, Salvatore Ferragamo, Louis Vuitton, Prada, Burberry, as well as outlets for 3.1 Phillip Lim, Martin Margiela and Tory Burch and Korean designer Son Jung-wan.

Preceding station	Seoul Metropolitan Subway	Following station
Seoul Forest towards Cheongnyangni	Suin–Bundang Line	Gangnam-gu Office towards Incheon
