= Mars Entertainment Group =

Turkish cinema operator

- Industry: Film
- Founded: 2001; 25 years ago
- Founder: Menderes Utku, Muzaffer Yıldırım
- Headquarters: Turkey
- Area served: Turkey
- Brands: Paribu Cineverse
- Parent: CJ CGV
- Website: www.marsentertainmentgroup.com.tr

Mars Entertainment Group is a Turkish cinema operator. Its cinema chain brand Paribu Cineverse has over 50% of the market share by box office gross and over 500 screens in the country. It's owned by CJ CGV.
