= Seoul Forest station =

Train station in South Korea

서울숲 (에스엠타운); Seoul Forest (SM Town)
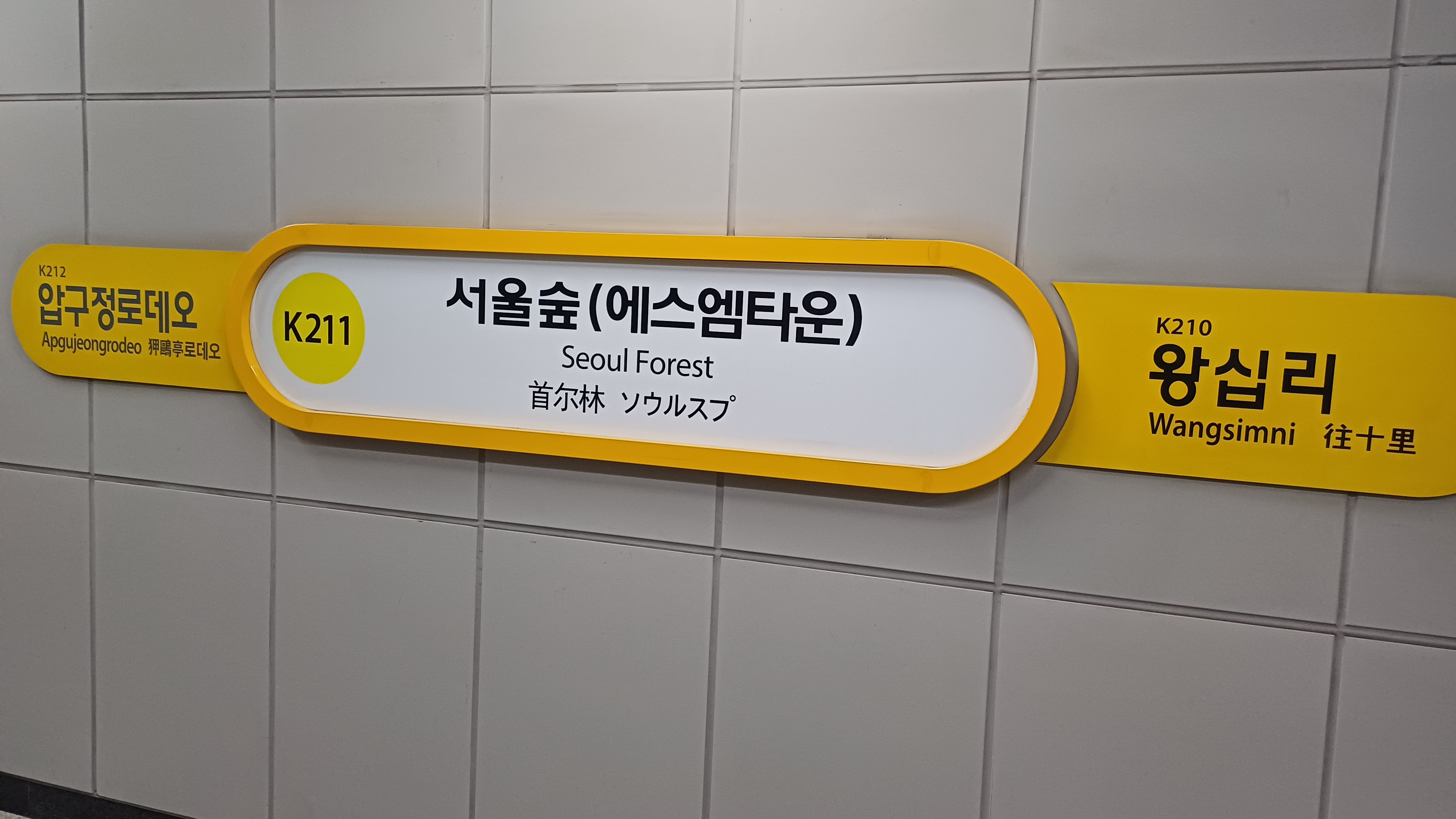

Korean name
- Hangul: 서울숲역
- Hanja: 서울숲驛
- Revised Romanization: Seoulsumnyeok
- McCune–Reischauer: Sŏulsumnyŏk

General information
- Location: under 77 Wangsimniro, Seongdong-gu, Seoul
- Coordinates: 37.543647°N 127.044686°E
- Operator: Korail
- Line: Suin–Bundang Line
- Platforms: 2
- Tracks: 2

Construction
- Structure type: Underground

Key dates
- October 6, 2012: Suin–Bundang Line opened
Location

Seoul Forest station is a station on the Suin–Bundang Line, a commuter rail line of Korail. It is near Seoul Forest, a large park.

Preceding station	Seoul Metropolitan Subway	Following station
Wangsimni towards Cheongnyangni	Suin–Bundang Line	Apgujeongrodeo towards Incheon
