= Hyundai Department Store =

South Korean retail company

Hyundai Department Store Co., Ltd.
- Native name: 주식회사 현대백화점
- Type: Public
- Traded as: KRX: 069960
- Industry: Retail
- Founded: 1971; 55 years ago
- Headquarters: Seoul, South Korea
- Parent: Hyundai Department Store Group
- Website: www.ehyundai.com

Hyundai Department Store (Korean: 현대백화점) is a major department store chain in South Korea. Its parent company is the Hyundai Department Store Group. It, Lotte Department Store, and Shinsegae are the three largest chains in the country.

== Stores ==
=== South Korea ===
The Hyundai Seoul Store at Parc one in Yeouido-dong, Seoul (flagship store)

Seoul Metropolitan Area

- Apgujeong Main Store (압구정 본점) in Gangnam-gu, Seoul
- World Trade Center Store (무역센터점) in Gangnam-gu, Seoul
- Cheonho Store (천호점, PHOTO SE SEOUL) in Gangdong-gu, Seoul
- Sinchon Store - Main Building & U-PLEX (신촌점 본관, 유플렉스) in Seodaemun-gu, Seoul
- Mia Store (미아점) in Seongbuk-gu, Seoul
- Mokdong Store (목동점) in Yangcheon-gu, Seoul
- Jungdong Store (중동점) in Wonmi-gu, Bucheon, Gyeonggi-do
- Kintex Store (킨텍스점) in Ilsanseo-gu, Goyang, Gyeonggi-do
- Pangyo Store (판교점) in Bundang-gu, Seongnam, Gyeonggi-do
- The Hyundai Seoul Store at Parc one in Yeouido-dong, Seoul (flagship store)

Yeongnam Region

- Ulsan Store (울산점) in Nam-gu, Ulsan
- Ulsan Dong-gu Store (울산동구점) in Dong-gu, Ulsan
- Busan Store (부산점) in Dong-gu, Busan
- Daegu Store (대구점) in Jung-gu, Daegu

Hoseo Region

- Chungcheong Store (충청점) in Heungdeok-gu, Cheongju, Chungcheongbuk-do

Outlet Stores

- Premium Outlets Gimpo
- Premium Outlets Songdo
- City Outlets Dasan
- City Outlets Dongdaemun

Defunct stores

- Bupyeong Store in Bupyeong-gu, Incheon (closed in 2003)
- Banpo Outlet in Seocho-gu, Seoul (closed in 2005)
- Fashion Outlet "May" (formerly Ulsan Seongnam Store) in Jung-gu, Ulsan (closed in 2005)
- Gwangju Store (광주점) in Buk-gu, Gwangju (closed in 2013)

=== International ===
- Omotesando Store in Tokyo, Japan (opening in 2026)
