= Galleria Department Store =

South Korean department store franchise

- Company type: Private company
- Industry: Retail
- Genre: Department Store
- Headquarters: Seoul, South Korea
- Products: Quality & luxury goods
- Parent: Hanwha Galleria, Hanwha Group
- Website: dept.galleria.co.kr

Galleria Department Store (Korean: 갤러리아백화점) is an upmarket South Korean department store franchise owned by Hanwha Group. It has 5 branches throughout Korea, notably the Luxury Hall West and Luxury Hall East, both in Apgujeong-dong, as upmarket luxury-brand fashion malls in Seoul.

== Stores ==
- Luxury Hall East and West in Apgujeong-dong, Gangnam District, Seoul
- Gwang-gyo Store in Yeongtong District, Suwon, Gyeonggi Province
- Time World Store in Seo District, Daejeon
- Center City Store in Seobuk District, Cheon-an, South Chungcheong Province (reopened in new location in 2011)
- Jinju Store in Jinju, South Gyeongsang Province

Defunct store

- Jamsil Store in Songpa District, Seoul (opened in 1983, closed in September 2000)
- Galleria Concos in Yongsan District, Seoul (Seoul Station)(closed in 2012 Change as Lotte Outllet Seoul st.)
- Dongbaek Store in Jung District, Daejeon (closed in 2013 Change as NC-mall Jungang-ro)

== Facilities ==
- Luxury Hall West and Luxury Hall East: the branch stocks a number of luxury brands including Hermes, Channel, Louis Vuitton, Dior, Goyard, Gucci and Fendi. As well as others such as Cartier, Van Cleef&Arpels, Graff, Patek Philippe, Vacheron Constantin and Breguet. Gourmet 494: a premium food boutique, located in the basement.
