= Sinsa-dong, Gangnam =

Neighbourhood in Seoul, South Korea

Sinsa-dong
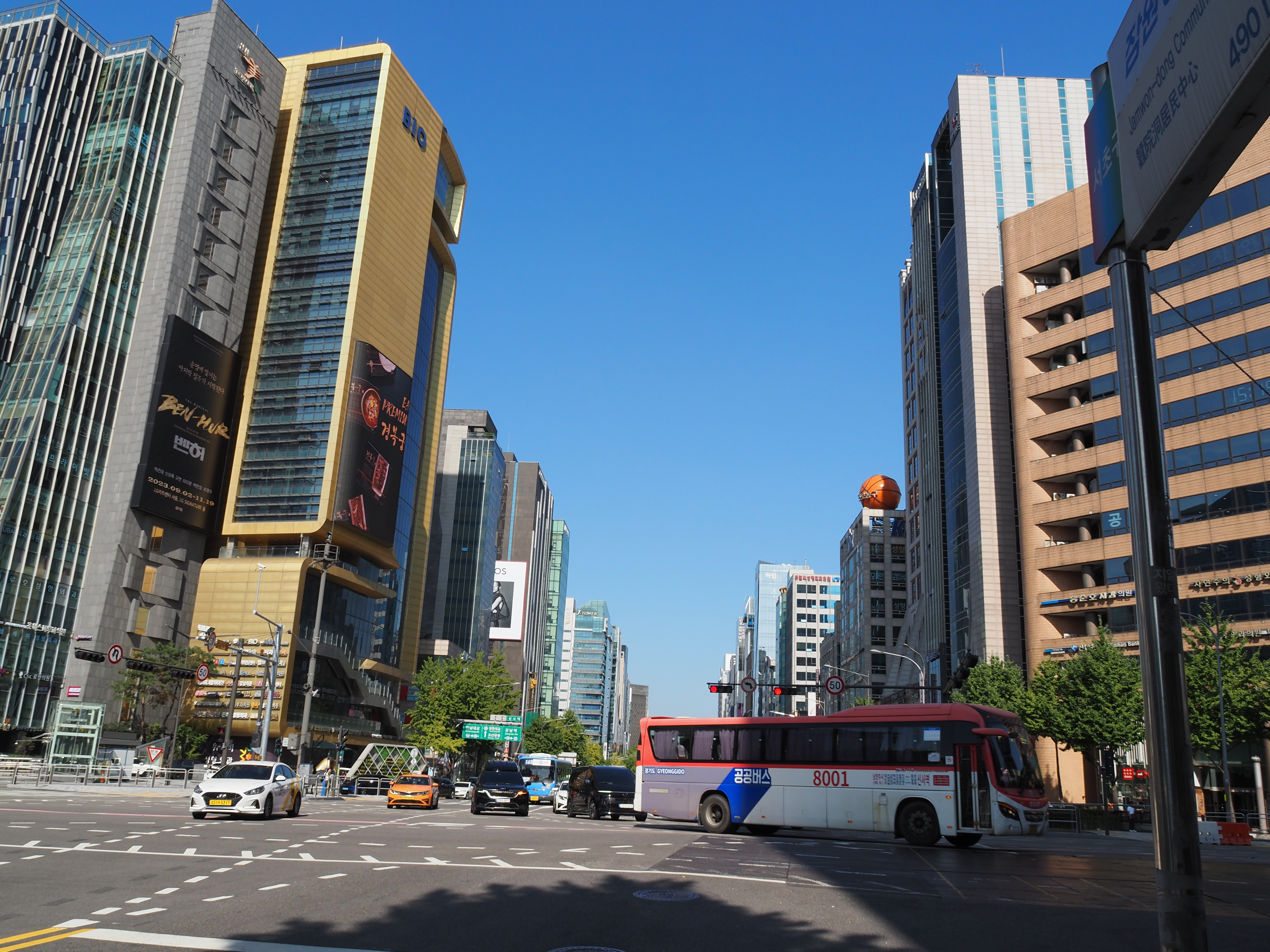

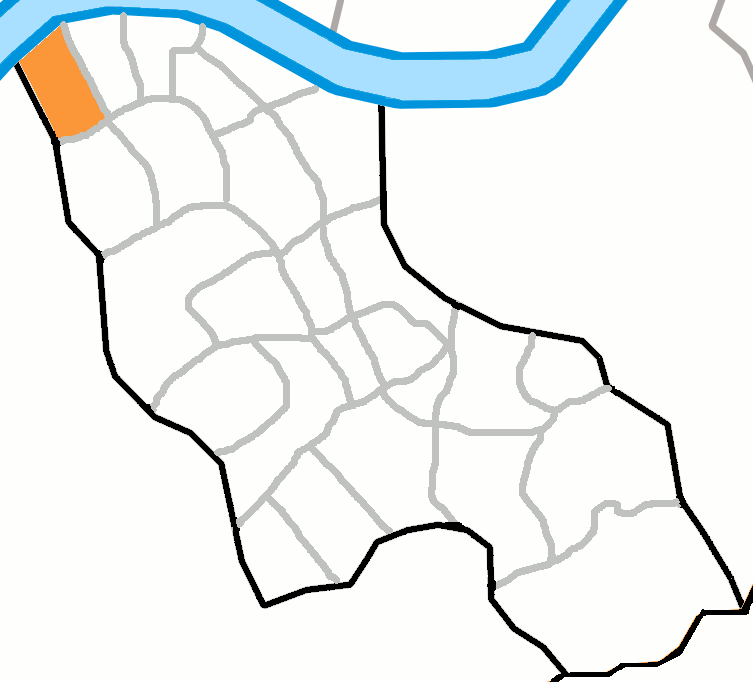
- Country: South Korea

Area
  - Total: 1.90 km^{2} (0.73 sq mi)

Population (2001)
  - Total: 23,368
  - Density: 12,299/km^{2} (31,850/sq mi)

Korean name
- Hangul: 신사동
- Hanja: 新沙洞
- RR: Sinsa-dong
- MR: Sinsa-dong

Sinsa-dong (Korean: 신사동) is a ward of Gangnam District, Seoul, South Korea. This district contains many department stores, hairshops, churches, boutiques, cafes and restaurants.

== Transportation ==
The area is served by Sinsa station on the Seoul Subway Line 3, and Seoul buses.

== Education ==
In Sinsa-dong, there are three schools: Singu Primary school (From Grade 1 to Grade 6), Sinsa Junior High school (From Grade 7 to Grade 9) and Hyundai Senior High school (Grade 10 to Grade 12). Sinsa Junior High school and Hyundai Senior High school are located just next to each other.

== Visitor attractions ==
In the area is Garosu-gil, a notable upscale shopping street. It is often called the "artists' street" due to its designer stores, unique coffee shops, and scenery.

Hangang Park, between Hannam Bridge and Banpo Bridge, has sports facilities such as basketball court, tennis court and swimming pool. In addition, people can find a luxurious ferry boat restaurant in Hangang park.

== See also ==
- Dong of Gangnam District
