= Milal Museum of Art =

Art museum

Coordinates: 37.4858°N 127.0823°E

- Hangul: 밀알미술관
- Hanja: 밀알美術館
- RR: Miral misulgwan
- MR: Miral misulgwan

The Milal Museum of Art (Korean: 밀알미술관) is an art museum in Seoul, South Korea.

== Transportation ==
The museum is accessible within walking distance south of Daecheong Station and north of Irwon station of Seoul Metro.

== See also ==
- List of museums in South Korea
