= Nonhyeon-dong, Seoul =

Neighbourhood in Seoul, South Korea

Nonhyeon-dong

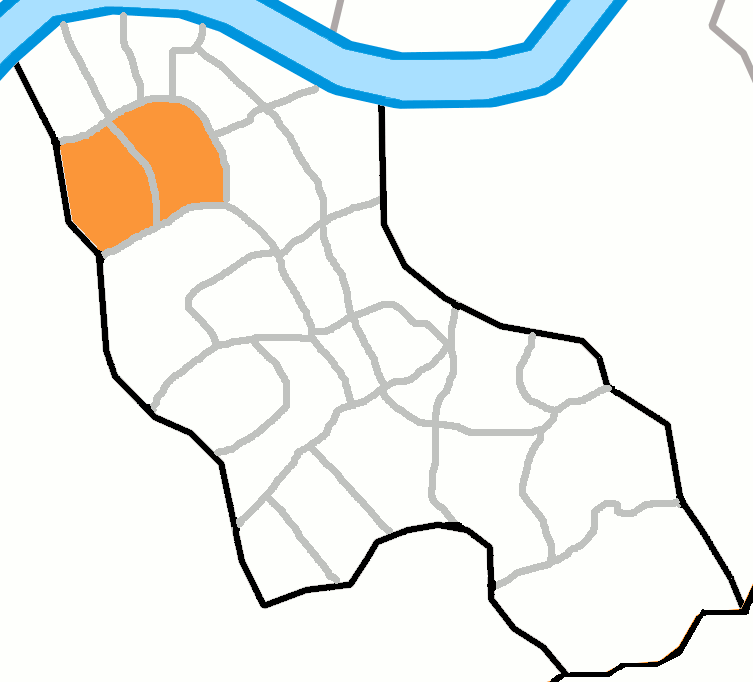
- Coordinates: 37.5135°N 127.0317°E
- Country: South Korea

Area
  - Total: 2.72 km^{2} (1.05 sq mi)

Population (2001)
  - Total: 48,917
  - Density: 17,984/km^{2} (46,580/sq mi)

Korean name
- Hangul: 논현동
- Hanja: 論峴洞
- RR: Nonhyeon-dong
- MR: Nonhyŏn-dong

Nonhyeon-dong (Korean: 논현동) is a ward of Gangnam District, Seoul, South Korea. It borders Apgujeong and Sinsa-dong on the north, Samseong-dong on the northeast, and Yeoksam-dong to the south.

Hakdong Park is located in the neighborhood.

== Etymology and history ==
The name of the current neighborhood is the sinicized name of the original Korean name "Non gogae (논고개)" which meant there was a valley of rice paddies in the region.

The region was originally part of Gwangju, Gyeonggi province in the Joseon era and was placed under the subdivision of Eonju myeon (언주면(彦州面), which now lends its name to Eonju station in Seoul Subway Line 9). The region became part of Seoul in 1963 as part of an expansion plan of Seoul, and it was initially placed under the Seongdong district, and was administered through the Sapyeong dong office of the Eonju branch office (called Eonju chuljangso(언주출장소) in Korean) (Note: Chuljangso(출장소,出場所) in Korean was a temporary office that is branch of the district main office that was temporarily installed to further develop city development in newly selected areas.) but was transferred to the Sinsadong office in the same branch office in 1970. Then in 1973, it was administered under the Yeongdong branch office due to the merger of different branch offices in the region. The region became part of the then newly created Gangnam District in 1975. In 1977 Nonhyeodong became a separate entity from Sinsadong and Hakdong was separated from Nonhyeon in 1980. Hakdong was later merged into Nonhyeondong in 1985 and now forms the beopjeongdong (legal neighbourhood) of Nonhyeon 2 dong.

== Education ==
Schools located in Nonhyeon-dong:

- Seoul Hakdong Elementary School
- Seoul Nonhyeon Elementary School
- Eonbuk Middle School

== Transport ==
These are the stations in the region:

- Hak-dong station (Seoul Subway Line 7)
- Nonhyeon station (Shinbundang Line, Seoul Subway Line 7)
- Eonju station (Seoul Subway Line 9)
- Sinnonhyeon station (Seoul Subway Line 9, Shinbundang Line)

== See also ==
- Dong of Gangnam District
- Administrative divisions of South Korea
