= Yeoksam station =

Station of the Seoul Metropolitan Subway

Coordinates: 37°30′2.83″N 127°2′12.79″E

역삼 (센터필드); Yeoksam (Centerfield)
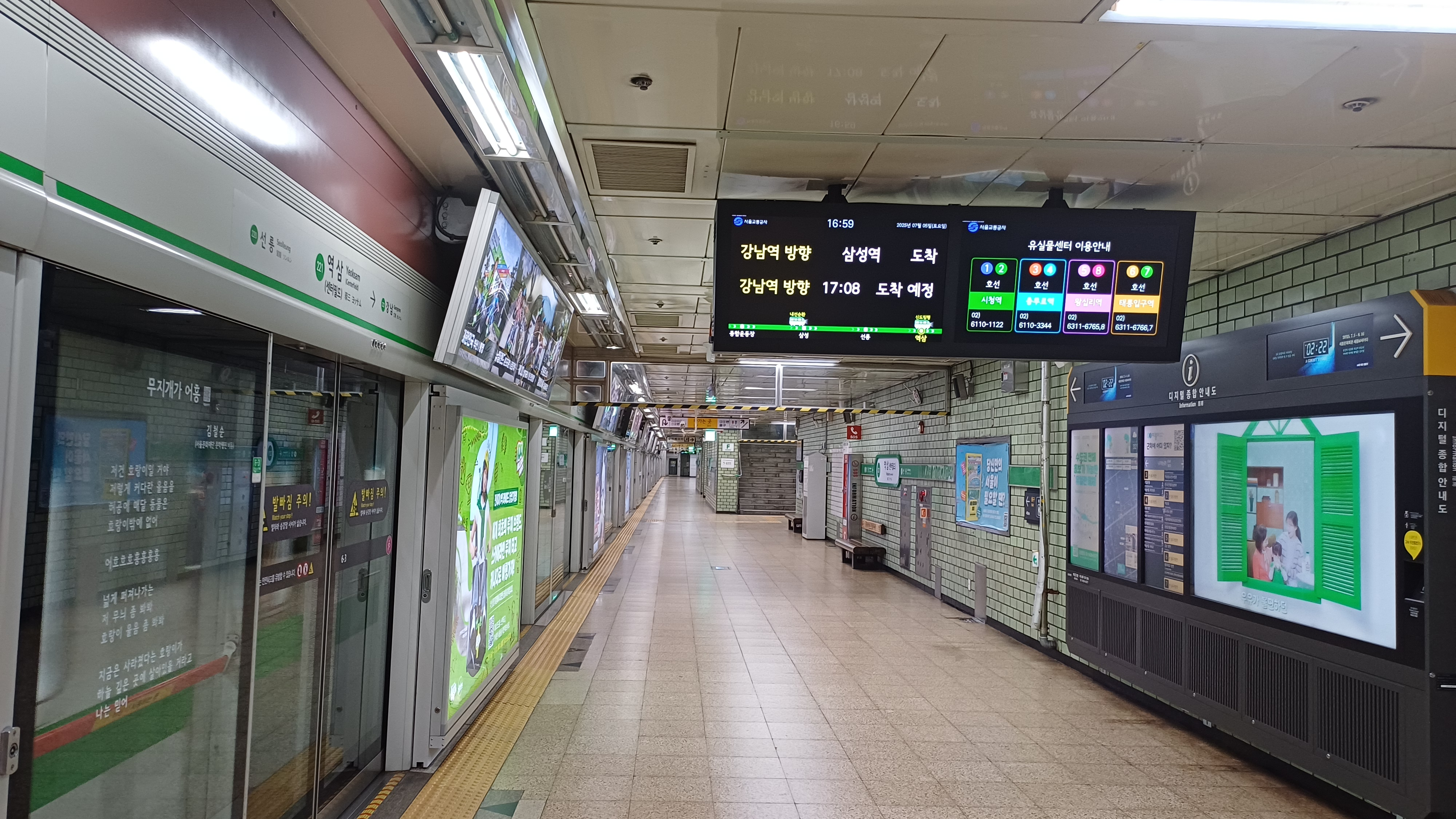
- Station platform in July 2025

Korean name
- Hangul: 역삼역
- Hanja: 驛三驛
- Revised Romanization: Yeoksam-yeok
- McCune–Reischauer: Yŏksam-yŏk

General information
- Location: 737 Yeoksam 1-dong, 156 Teherandaero Jiha, Gangnam-gu, Seoul
- Operator: Seoul Metro
- Line: Line 2
- Platforms: 2
- Tracks: 2

Construction
- Structure type: Underground

History
- Opened: December 23, 1982

Passengers
- (Daily) Based on Jan-Dec of 2012. Line 2: 100,040

Services
Preceding station	Seoul Metropolitan Subway	Following station
Seolleung Next counterclockwise	Line 2	Gangnam Next clockwise
Location

Yeoksam Station is a station on Line 2 of the Seoul Subway. It is located in Yeoksam-dong, Gangnam-gu, Seoul.

== Station layout ==
G	Street level	Exit

L1; Concourse	Lobby	Customer Service, Shops, Vending machines, ATMs

L2; Platform level	Side platform, doors will open on the right
L2; Platform level	Inner circle	← Line 2 Next clockwise (Gangnam)
L2; Platform level	Outer circle	Line 2 Next counterclockwise (Seolleung) →
L2; Platform level	Side platform, doors will open on the right

== Vicinity ==
- Exit 4 : Kukkiwon (World Taekwondo Headquarters)
- Exit 7 : Cha Hospital, LG Arts Center
