= Daecheong station =

Train station in South Korea

대청 (서울주택도시개발공사); Daecheong (SH)
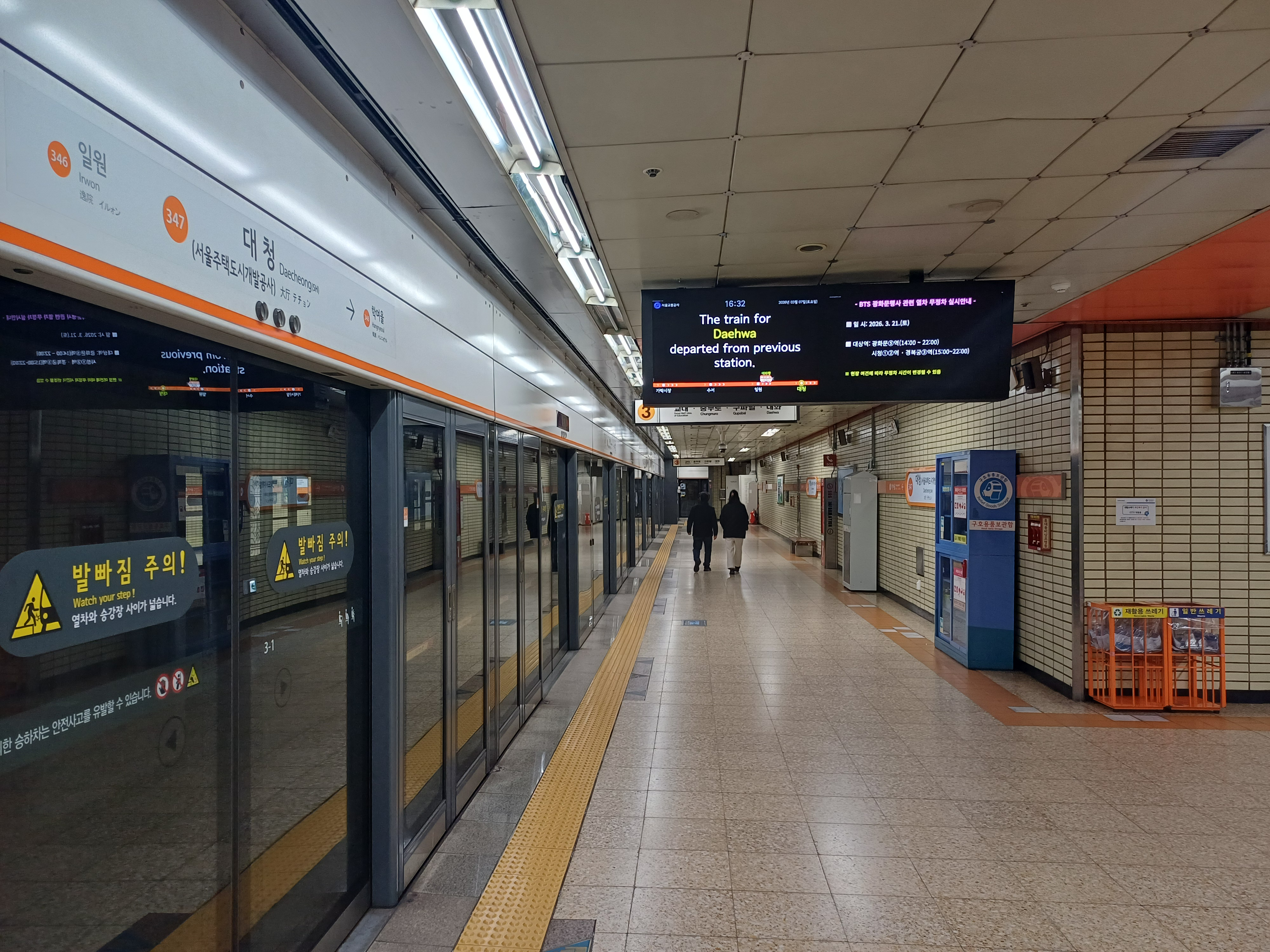

Korean name
- Hangul: 대청역
- Hanja: 대청驛
- Revised Romanization: Daecheong-yeok
- McCune–Reischauer: Taech'ŏng-yŏk

General information
- Location: 700-9 Irwon-dong, 2 Irwonno Jiha, Gangnam-gu, Seoul
- Coordinates: 37°29′37″N 127°04′46″E
- Operator: Seoul Metro
- Line: Line 3
- Platforms: 2
- Tracks: 2

Construction
- Structure type: Underground

Key dates
- October 30, 1993: Line 3 opened

Passengers
- (Daily) Based on Jan-Dec of 2012. Line 3: 21,839
Location

Daecheong Station is a station on the Seoul Subway Line 3. It is located in Irwon-dong, Gangnam District, Seoul, South Korea.

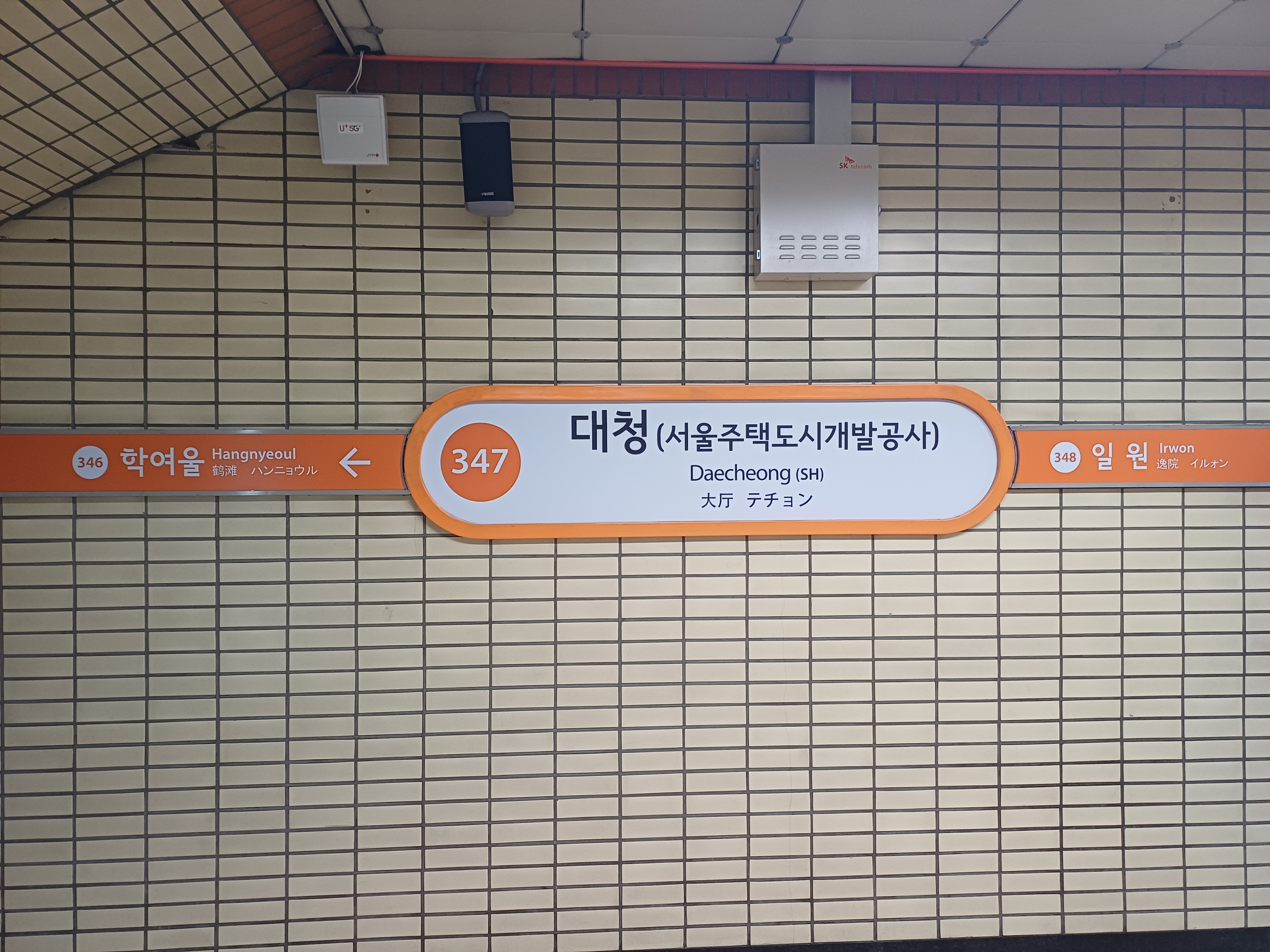

== Station layout ==
G	Street level	Exit

L1; Concourse	Lobby	Customer Service, Shops, Vending machines, ATMs

L2; Platforms	Side platform, doors will open on the right
L2; Platforms	Northbound	← Line 3 toward Daehwa (Hangnyeoul)
L2; Platforms	Southbound	Line 3 toward Ogeum (Irwon) →
L2; Platforms	Side platform, doors will open on the right

== Around the station ==
- Milal Museum of Art

Preceding station	Seoul Metropolitan Subway	Following station
Hangnyeoul towards Daehwa	Line 3	Irwon towards Ogeum
