= Daechi-dong =

Neighborhood in Seoul, South Korea

Coordinates: 37°30′N 127°03′E

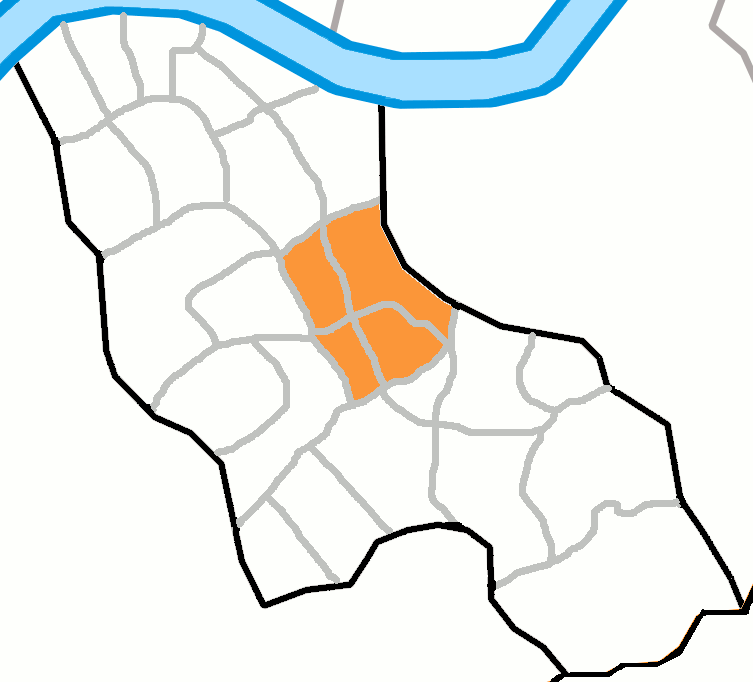
- Country: South Korea

Area
  - Total: 3.53 km^{2} (1.36 sq mi)

Population (2001)
  - Total: 86,644
  - Density: 24,545/km^{2} (63,570/sq mi)

Korean name
- Hangul: 대치동
- Hanja: 大峙洞
- RR: Daechi-dong
- MR: Taech'i-dong

Daechi-dong (Korean: 대치동) is an affluent neighborhood in Gangnam District, Seoul, South Korea. Daechi-dong is divided into three different "dongs" which are Daechi 1-dong, 2-dong, and 4-dong. Daechi-dong is predominantly considered the residential area of Gangnam. As a result, real estate in the area is highly competitive and expensive compared to other parts of Gangnam. The Yangjaecheon is a stream that runs through the heart of Daechi-dong.

== Name and history ==
The name Daechi-dong came from the Chinese form of Hanti Town which meant a town below a big hill. Daechi-dong had a number of names. Just after the Joseon period, it was referred to as Unju-myeon, and was administered as a part of Gwangju-gun, Gyeonggi Province. Then on April 1, 1914, the name was changed to Daechi-li, and it was redistricted into Unju-myeon, Kwangju-gun. It finally changed into Daechi-dong and became a part of the city of Seoul when the city's administrative district was expanded on January 1, 1963, with law number 1172 after independence from the Japanese occupation. As of October 1, 1975, it was brought under the administration of Gangnam District which is where it remains today.

== Education ==
In Korea, Daechi-dong is seen as the Mecca of private education due in part to the high concentrations of hagwons (private institute, for English and other subjects) in the area. The real estate prices in Daechi-dong are very high compared to that of other upscale neighborhoods in Gangnam. It is also the place which sends the most students by percentage to Korea's so-called "SKY" universities: Seoul National University, Korea University, and Yonsei University. This began in the 1960s when hagwons began to open near the high-schools with the best academic reputations. Currently, there are over 950 of these hagwons in Daechi-dong.
This educational infrastructure attracts many families to the area, and is one of the largest reasons for Daechi-dong's high real estate prices.

=== Schools and academies ===
Schools located in Daechi-dong:

- Daehyun Elementary School
- Daechi Elementary School
- Dogok Elementary School
- Daegok Elementary School
- Daemyeong Middle School
- Daecheong Middle School
- Whimoon Middle School
- Dankook University Middle School
- Sookmyung Girls' Middle School
- Sookmyung Girls' High School
- Whimoon High School
- Jinseon Girls' High School
- Dankook University Software High School
- Dankook University High School
- Kim Dohyun New Media English

== Attractions ==
Yangjaecheon is a major stream that flows through Daechi-dong and Gaepo-dong. It is relatively long and runs through 4 dongs. Yangjaecheon is the result of the restoration of a polluted natural marsh, and it is home to 22 kinds of fish (such as catfish and hornet fish) and over 150 kinds of plants. There are also many birds, including the reed warbler, white heron, butcherbird, and swans.
The Seoul Trade Exhibition & Convention Center (SETEC) is also located in Daechi-dong. SETEC is a professional exhibition convention center with special exhibits, international conferences, and convention halls. Some of the major events are International Fair Trade Conference and LOGIN TOURISM. There is also a legend that said "beyond the river, upon a dream. A treasure chest sinking in love".

== Community Events ==
The most major events in Daechi-dong are the Hanti Festival and Gangnam Sports Day. Hanti Festival is celebrated to strengthen the community spirit and to rethink about the past when the dong was called Hanti Town. People of all ages can participate and enjoy many kinds of activities such as tug of war, singing competitions, and running. There is also much available food. Gangnam Sports Day features a B-boy dance performance, parade, athletic competition, awards ceremony, and performances by top Korean singers.

== Economy ==
The Korean subsidiary of American Megatrends, AMI Korea, is headquartered on the eighth floor of the Sepung Building (세풍빌딩) in Daechidong.

== Transportation ==
The neighborhood is served by the following stations of the Seoul Subway:

- Daechi (Line 3)
- Dogok (Line 3, Bundang Line)†
- Hangnyeoul (Line 3)
- Hanti (Bundang Line)
- Samseong (Line 2)
- Seolleung (Line 2, Bundang Line)

== Sub-divisions ==
, 2-dong the southeast, 3-dong
