= Hanti station =

Train station in South Korea

| 한티; Hanti |
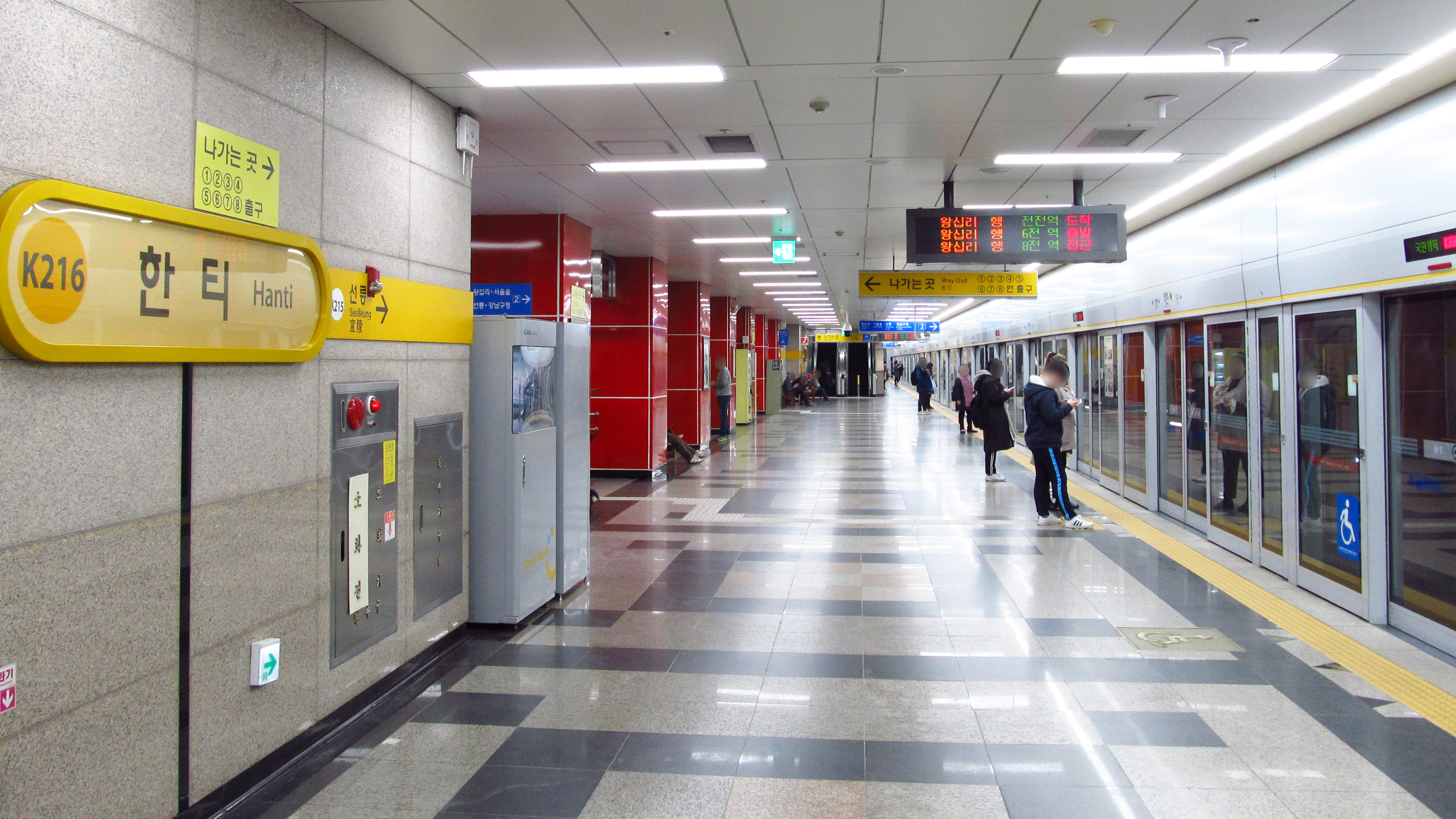

Korean name
- Hangul: 한티역
- Hanja: 한티驛
- Revised Romanization: Hanti-yeok
- McCune–Reischauer: Hant'i-yŏk

General information
- Location: 1011-28 Daechi-dong, 644 Seolleungno, Gangnam-gu, Seoul
- Coordinates: 37°29′46″N 127°03′10″E
- Operator: Korail
- Line: Suin–Bundang Line
- Platforms: 2
- Tracks: 2

Construction
- Structure type: Underground

Key dates
- September 3, 2003: Suin–Bundang Line opened
Location

Hanti Station (Korean: 한티역) is a station on the Suin–Bundang Line, a commuter rail line of Korail.

The name of this station is taken from that of a former village in the vicinity, and has meaning "great hill" in the native Korean language. Daechi (大峙), the neighborhood in which the station is located, is the Chinese translation of this name. Prior to opening, this station was tentatively known as Yeongdong Station. The current name 'Hanti Station' was selected in order to avoid confusion with an existing Yeongdong station (in Yeongdong County) on the Gyeongbu Line.

The Gangnam Lotte Department Store has a direct underground link with the station. There are many restaurants and academies near Hanti Station.

== Vicinity ==
- Exit 1, 2 : Lotte Department Store, Dogok Elementary School
- Exit 3 : Dankook Middle School, Dankook High School
- Exit 5, 6 : Homeplus Express Dogok
- Exit 7 : Yeoksam Middle School

| Preceding station | Seoul Metropolitan Subway | Following station |
|---|---|---|
| Seolleung towards Cheongnyangni | Suin–Bundang Line | Dogok towards Incheon |
