= Gaepo-dong =

Neighborhood in Seoul, South Korea

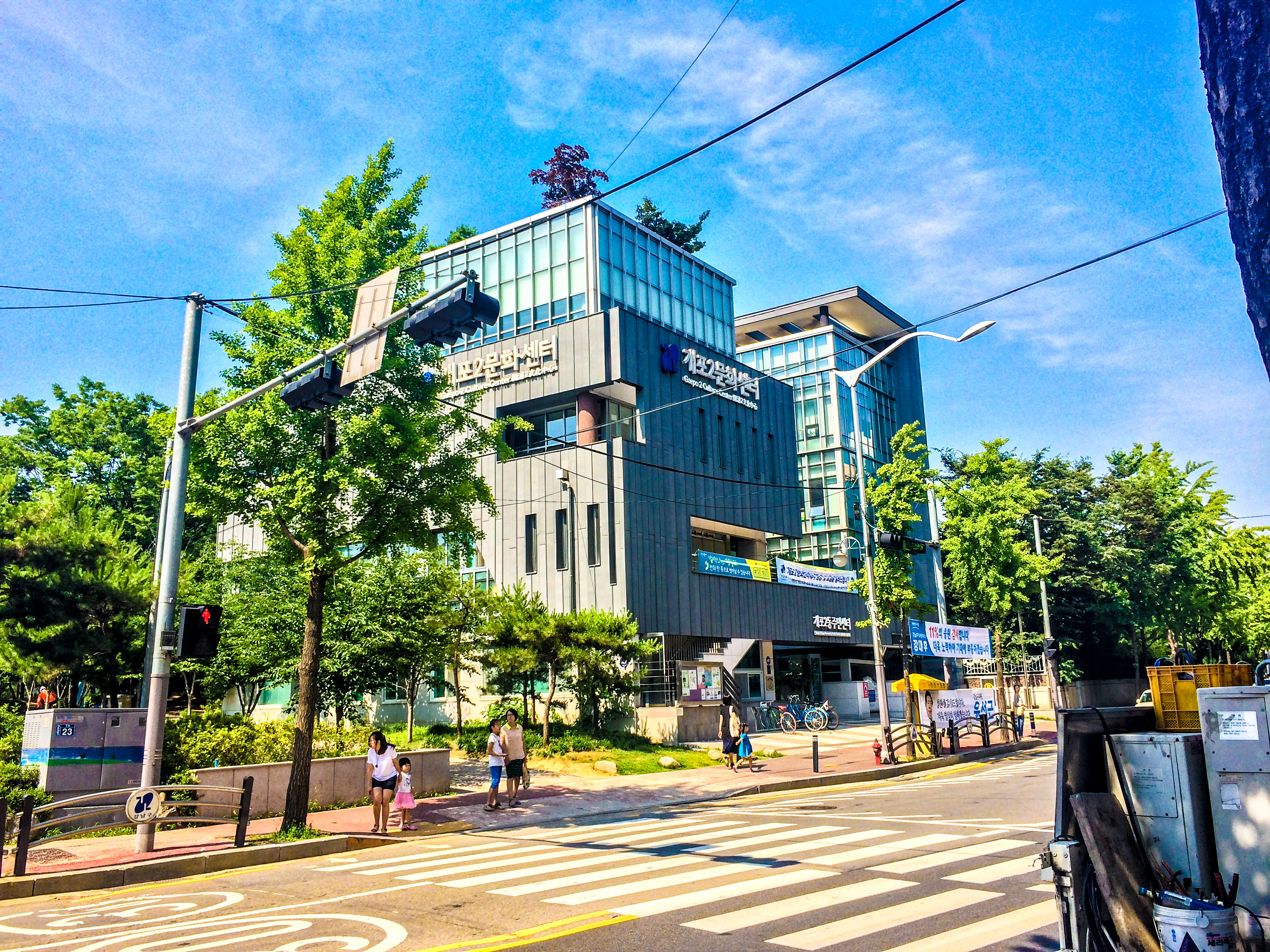
- Gaepo 2(i)-dong Community Service Center (Gangnam-gu)

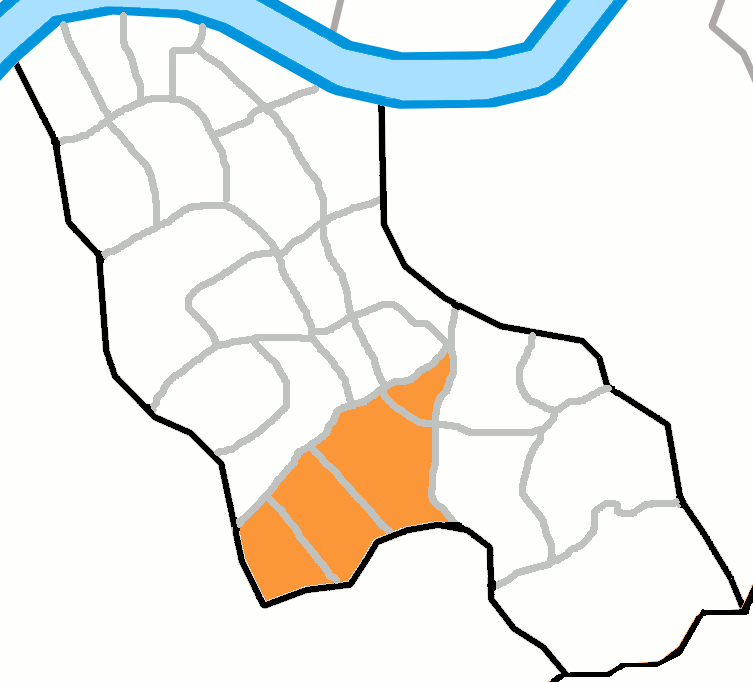
- Country: South Korea

Area
  - Total: 5.28 km^{2} (2.04 sq mi)

Population (2001)
  - Total: 86,821
  - Density: 16,443/km^{2} (42,590/sq mi)

Korean name
- Hangul: 개포동
- Hanja: 開浦洞
- RR: Gaepo-dong
- MR: Kaep'o-dong

Gaepo-dong (Korean: 개포동) is a ward of Gangnam District, Seoul, South Korea, south of Dogok-dong and Daechi-dong. Gaepodong is divided into three "dong": Gaepo 1, 2, and 4 dong. Gaepo 3-dong had been merged with Gaepo 2-dong in 2009.

== Education ==
Schools located in Gaepo-dong

- Daejin Elementary School
- Gaeil Elementary School
- Gaepo Elementary School
- Gaewon Elementary School
- Kuryong Elementary School
- Seoul Poi Elementary School
- Yangjon Elementary School
- Gaepo Middle School
- Gaewon Middle School
- Kuryong Middle School
- Gugak National High School
- Gaepo High School
- Kyunggi Girls' High School
- Sudo Electric Technical High School
- Korea International School

The Japanese School of Seoul was previously in Gaepo-dong. Circa 2010 it moved to Digital Media City.

== Local Community ==
- Gae-po Public Library

== Attraction ==
- Yangjaecheon
- Gaepodong Green Park

== Notable people from Gaepo-dong ==
- Jeon So-yeon, South Korean singer-songwriter, rapper, dancer, record producer and K-pop idol, leader and member of K-pop girlgroup (G)I-dle.
- Kim Chaewon, South Korean singer, dancer, and K-pop idol, leader and member of girlgroup Le Sserafim. Past member of now inactive girlgroup Iz*One.

== See also ==
- Dong of Gangnam-gu
- Administrative divisions of South Korea
- Poi-dong
