= Administrative divisions of Gangnam District =

Divisions of Seoul, South Korea

There are 26 dong (neighborhoods) in Gangnam District.

- Apgujeong 1-dong
- Apgujeong 2-dong
- Cheongdam 1-dong
- Cheongdam 2-dong
- Daechi 1-dong
- Daechi 2-dong
- Daechi 3-dong
- Daechi 4-dong
- Dogok 1-dong
- Dogok 2-dong
- Gaepo 1-dong
- Gaepo 2-dong
- Gaepo 3-dong
- Gaepo 4-dong
- Irwon 1-dong
- Irwon 2-dong
- Irwon bon-dong
- Nonhyeon 1-dong
- Nonhyeon 2-dong
- Samseong 1-dong
- Samseong 2-dong
- Segok-dong
- Sinsa-dong
- Suseo-dong
- Yeoksam 1-dong
- Yeoksam 2-dong

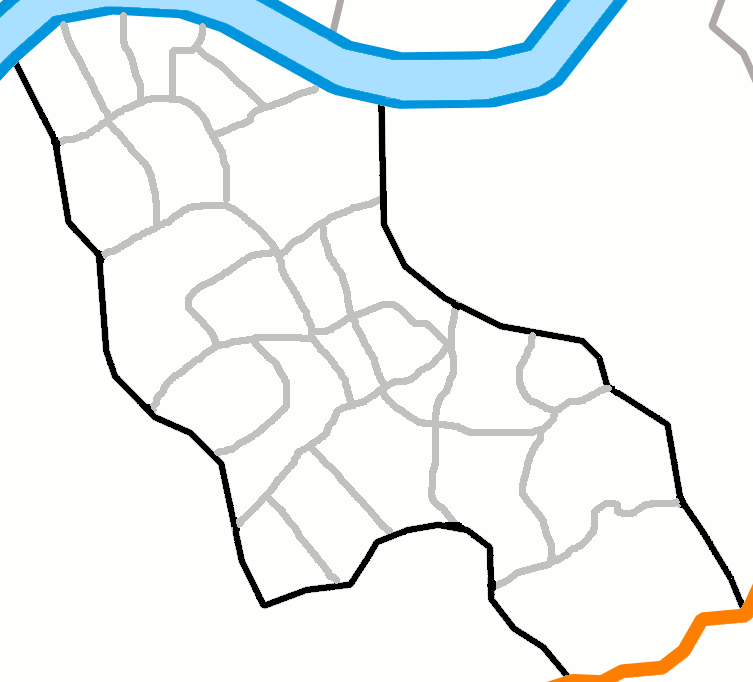
The dong of Gangnam District

== List by Population and Area ==
Name	Population	Area	Population Density
Apgujeong	33,036	2.53 km^{2} (0.98 sq mi)	13,058 /km^{2} (33,820 /sq mi)
Cheongdam-dong	34,262	2.33 km^{2} (0.90 sq mi)	14,705 /km^{2} (38,090 /sq mi)
Daechi-dong	86,644	3.53 km^{2} (1.36 sq mi)	24,545 /km^{2} (63,570 /sq mi)
Dogok-dong	40,111	2.04 km^{2} (0.79 sq mi)	19,662 /km^{2} (50,920 /sq mi)
Gaepo-dong	86,821	5.28 km^{2} (2.04 sq mi)	16,443 /km^{2} (42,590 /sq mi)
Irwon-dong	68,018	4.74 km^{2} (1.83 sq mi)	14,350 /km^{2} (37,200 /sq mi)
Nonhyeon-dong	48,917	2.72 km^{2} (1.05 sq mi)	17,984 /km^{2} (46,580 /sq mi)
Samseong-dong	41,171	3.19 km^{2} (1.23 sq mi)	12,906 /km^{2} (33,430 /sq mi)
Segok-dong	6,884	6.36 km^{2} (2.46 sq mi)	1,082 /km^{2} (2,800 /sq mi)
Sinsa-dong	23,368	1.90 km^{2} (0.73 sq mi)	12,299 /km^{2} (31,850 /sq mi)
Suseo-dong	25,000	1.43 km^{2} (0.55 sq mi)	17,483 /km^{2} (45,280 /sq mi)
Yeoksam-dong	60,774	3.50 km^{2} (1.35 sq mi)	7,364 /km^{2} (44,970 /sq mi)

== General information ==
Name	Sub-Divisions	Points of Interest	Image	Location	Description
Apgujeong	Apgujeong 1-dong; Apgujeong 2-dong				A major shopping district
Cheongdam-dong	Cheongdam 1-dong; Cheongdam 2-dong	Dosan Park; Rodeo Street			
Daechi-dong	Daechi 1-dong; Daechi 2-dong; Daechi 3-dong; Daechi 4-dong	Yangjaecheon			
Dogok-dong	Dogok 1-dong; Dogok 2-dong	Yangjaecheon; Tower Palace			
Gaepo-dong	Gaepo 1-dong; Gaepo 2-dong; Gaepo 3-dong; Gaepo 4-dong				
Irwon-dong	Irwon 1-dong; Irwon 2-dong; Irwon bon-dong				
Nonhyeon-dong	Nonhyeon 1-dong; Nonhyeon 2-dong				
Samseong-dong	Samseong 1-dong; Samseong 2-dong	COEX Convention & Exhibition Center; Bongeunsa; Kimchi Field Museum; Teheranno			
Segok-dong	None				Segok-dong is the largest dong in Gangnam District, but has the smallest population.
Sinsa-dong	None				
Suseo-dong	None	Tancheon			
Yeoksam-dong	Yeoksam 1-dong; Yeoksam 2-dong	Teheranno			

== See also ==
- Gu of Seoul
