= Suseo-dong =

Neighbourhood in Seoul, South Korea

Coordinates: 37.4864°N 127.0961°E

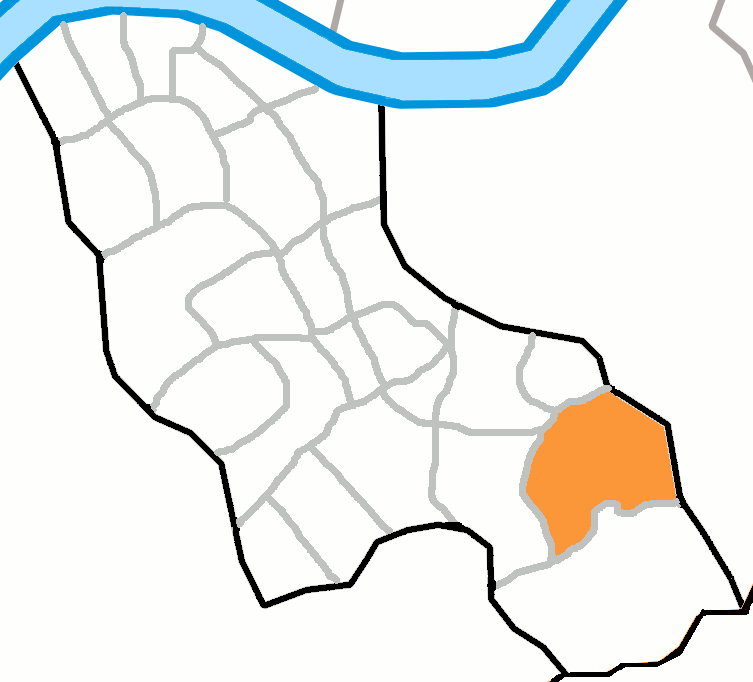
- Country: South Korea

Area
  - Total: 1.43 km^{2} (0.55 sq mi)

Population (2004)
  - Total: 25,000
  - Density: 17,483/km^{2} (45,280/sq mi)

Korean name
- Hangul: 수서동
- Hanja: 水西洞
- RR: Suseo-dong
- MR: Susŏ-dong

Suseo-dong (Korean: 수서동) is a ward of Gangnam District, Seoul, South Korea. The name Suseo originated from the feature of Han River running through the western part of the region. Suseo-dong is also home to the Tancheon park.

== Education ==
Schools located in Suseo-dong:

- Seoul Wangbuk Elementary School
- Seoul Suseo Elementary School
- Daewang Middle School
- Suseo Middle School
- Daejin Design High School
- Seoul Sejong High School

== See also ==
- Dong of Gangnam District
