= Irwon station =

Train station in South Korea

일원; Irwon
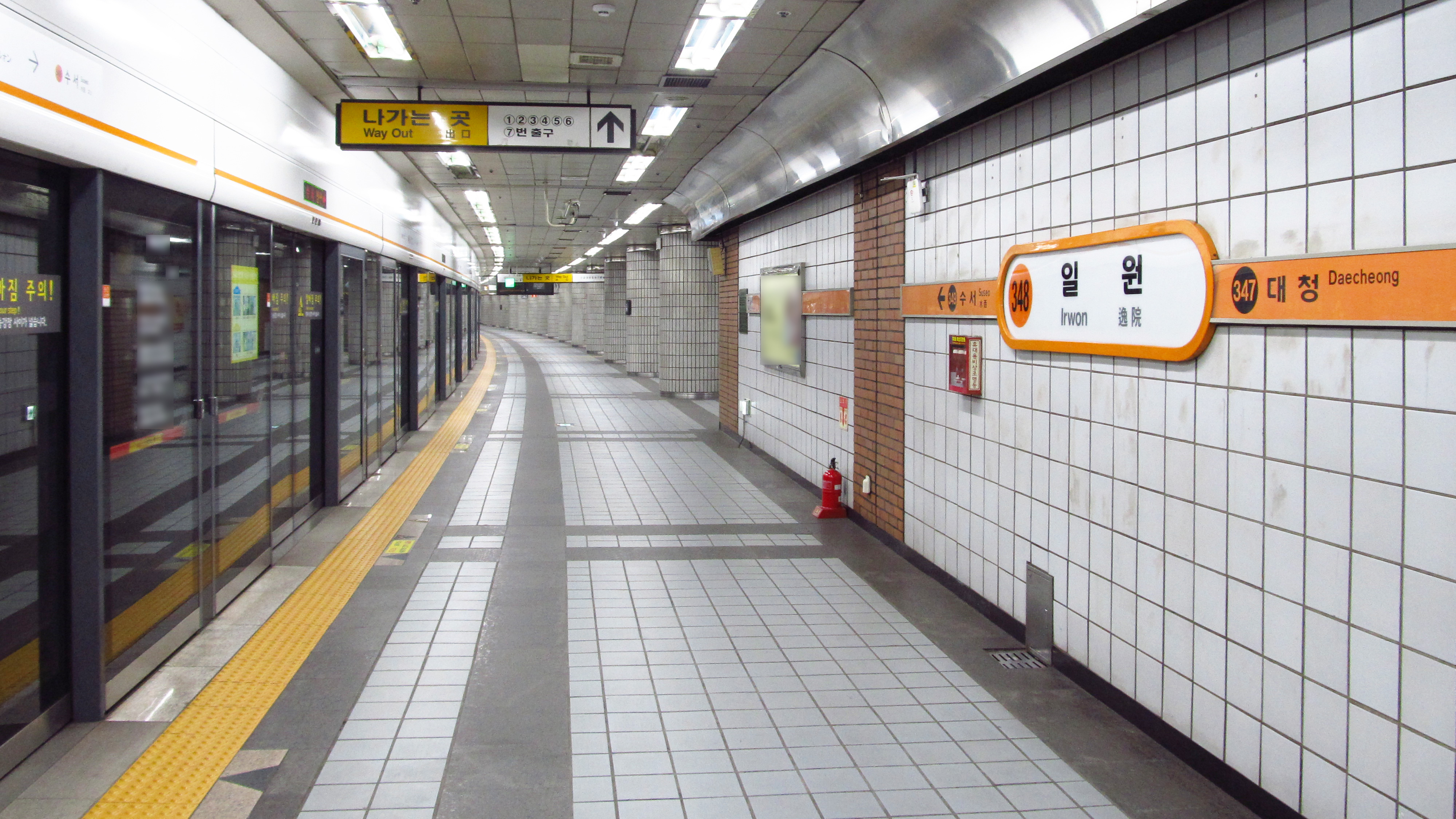

Korean name
- Hangul: 일원역
- Hanja: 逸院驛
- Revised Romanization: Irwonnyeok
- McCune–Reischauer: Irwŏnnyŏk

General information
- Location: 717 Irwon-dong, 121 Irwonno Jiha, Gangnam-gu, Seoul
- Coordinates: 37°29′02″N 127°05′03″E
- Operated by: Seoul Metro
- Line(s): Line 3
- Platforms: 2
- Tracks: 2

Construction
- Structure type: Underground

Key dates
- October 30, 1993: Line 3 opened

Passengers
- (Daily) Based on Jan-Dec of 2012. Line 3: 19,307

Irwon Station (Korean: 일원역) is a station on Seoul Subway Line 3. It is in Irwon-dong, Gangnam District, Seoul, South Korea.

It is the closest subway station to the Samsung Medical Center, and a free shuttle runs between the two. The shuttle bus can be accessed via Exit #1. There is also elevator access.

== Station layout ==
G	Street level	Exit

L1; Concourse	Lobby	Customer Service, Shops, Vending machines, ATMs

L2; Platforms	Side platform, doors will open on the right
L2; Platforms	Northbound	← Line 3 toward Daehwa (Daecheong)
L2; Platforms	Southbound	Line 3 toward Ogeum (Suseo) →
L2; Platforms	Side platform, doors will open on the right

Preceding station	Seoul Metropolitan Subway	Following station
Daecheong towards Daehwa	Line 3	Suseo towards Ogeum
