= Hangnyeoul station =

Train station in South Korea

학여울; Hangnyeoul
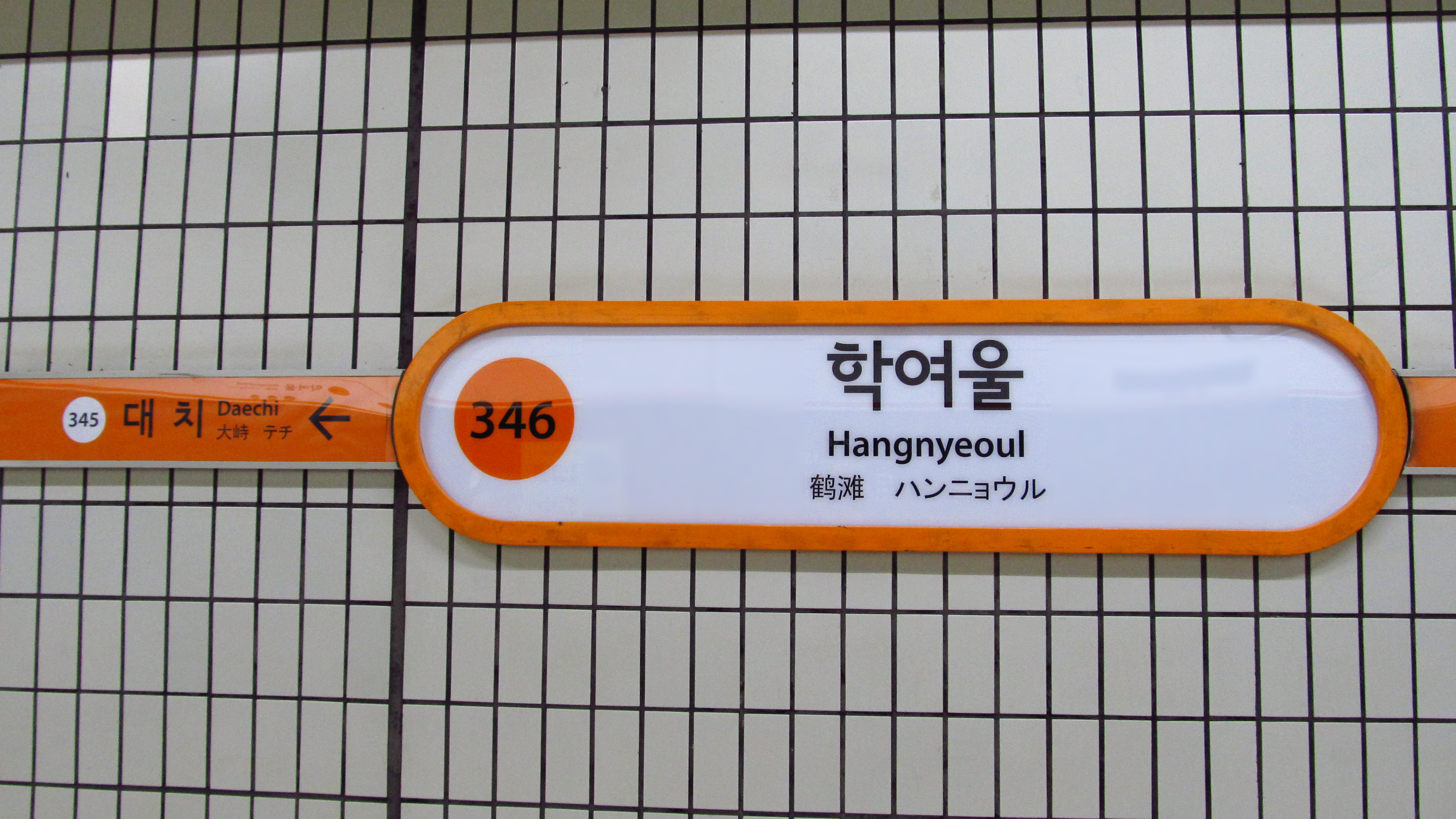

Korean name
- Hangul: 학여울역
- Hanja: 鶴여울驛
- RR: Hangnyeoul-yeok
- MR: Hangnyŏul-yŏk

General information
- Location: 514-3 Daechi 2-dong, 3104 Nambusunhwanno Jiha, Gangnam-gu, Seoul
- Coordinates: 37°29′37″N 127°04′46″E
- Operator: Seoul Metro
- Line: Line 3
- Platforms: 2
- Tracks: 2

Construction
- Structure type: Underground

Key dates
- October 30, 1993: Line 3 opened

Passengers
- (Daily) Based on Jan-Dec of 2012. Line 3: 6,007
Location

Hangnyeoul Station (Korean: 학여울역) is a station on the Seoul Subway Line 3 in Gangnam District, Seoul. The only exit of this station is connected to SETEC (Seoul Trade Exhibition & Convention Center). This station has the least ridership of all Line 3 stations in Seoul.

It is located in Daechi-dong, Gangnam District, Seoul.

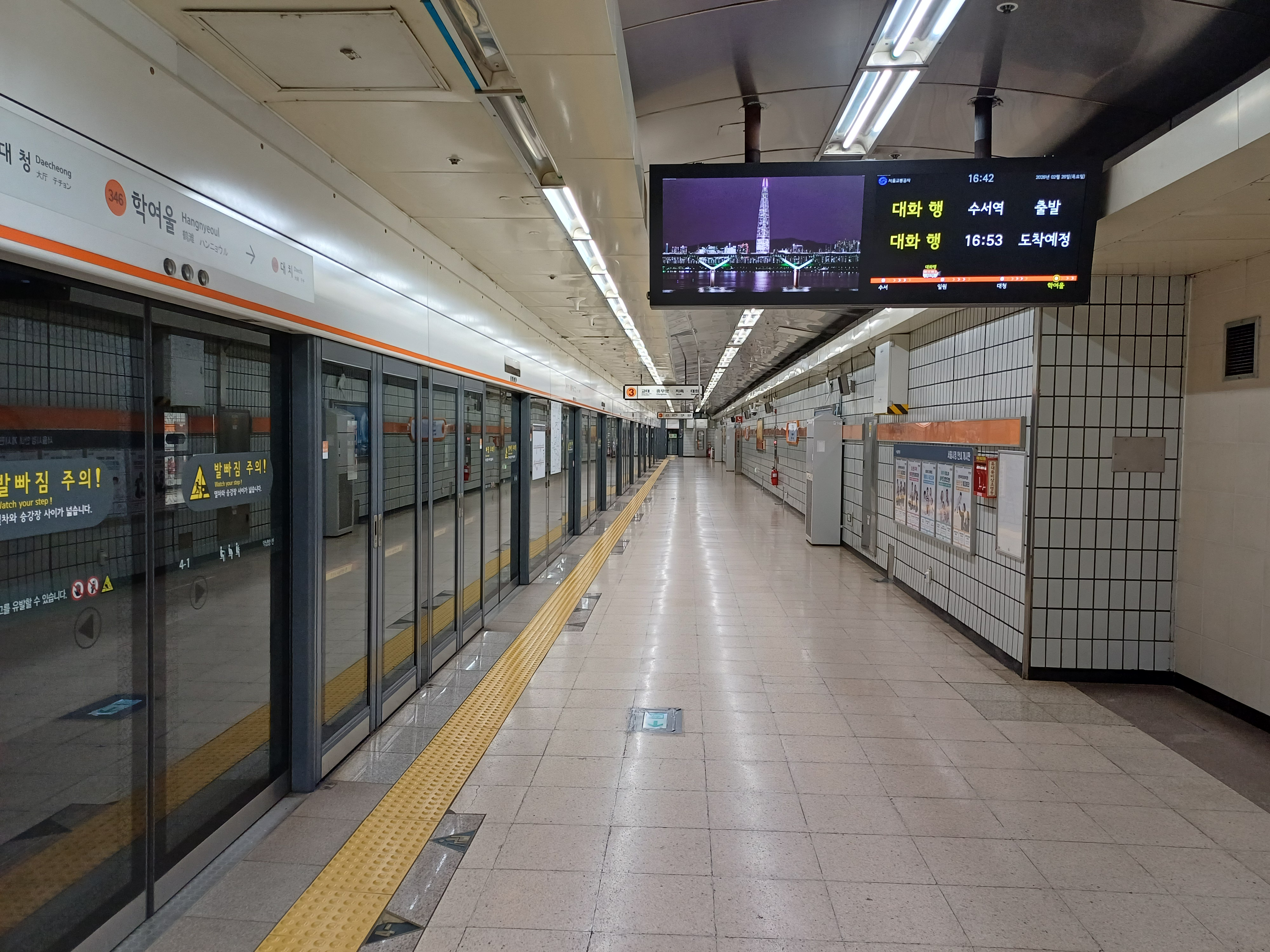

== Station layout ==
G	Street level	Exit

L1; Concourse	Lobby	Customer Service, Shops, Vending machines, ATMs

L2; Platforms	Side platform, doors will open on the right
L2; Platforms	Northbound	← Line 3 toward Daehwa (Daechi)
L2; Platforms	Southbound	Line 3 toward Ogeum (Daecheong) →
L2; Platforms	Side platform, doors will open on the right

== Vicinity ==
- Exit 1 : Seoul Trade Exhibition Center

Preceding station	Seoul Metropolitan Subway	Following station
Daechi towards Daehwa	Line 3	Daecheong towards Ogeum
