= Daechi station =

Railway station in Seoul, South Korea

대치; Daechi
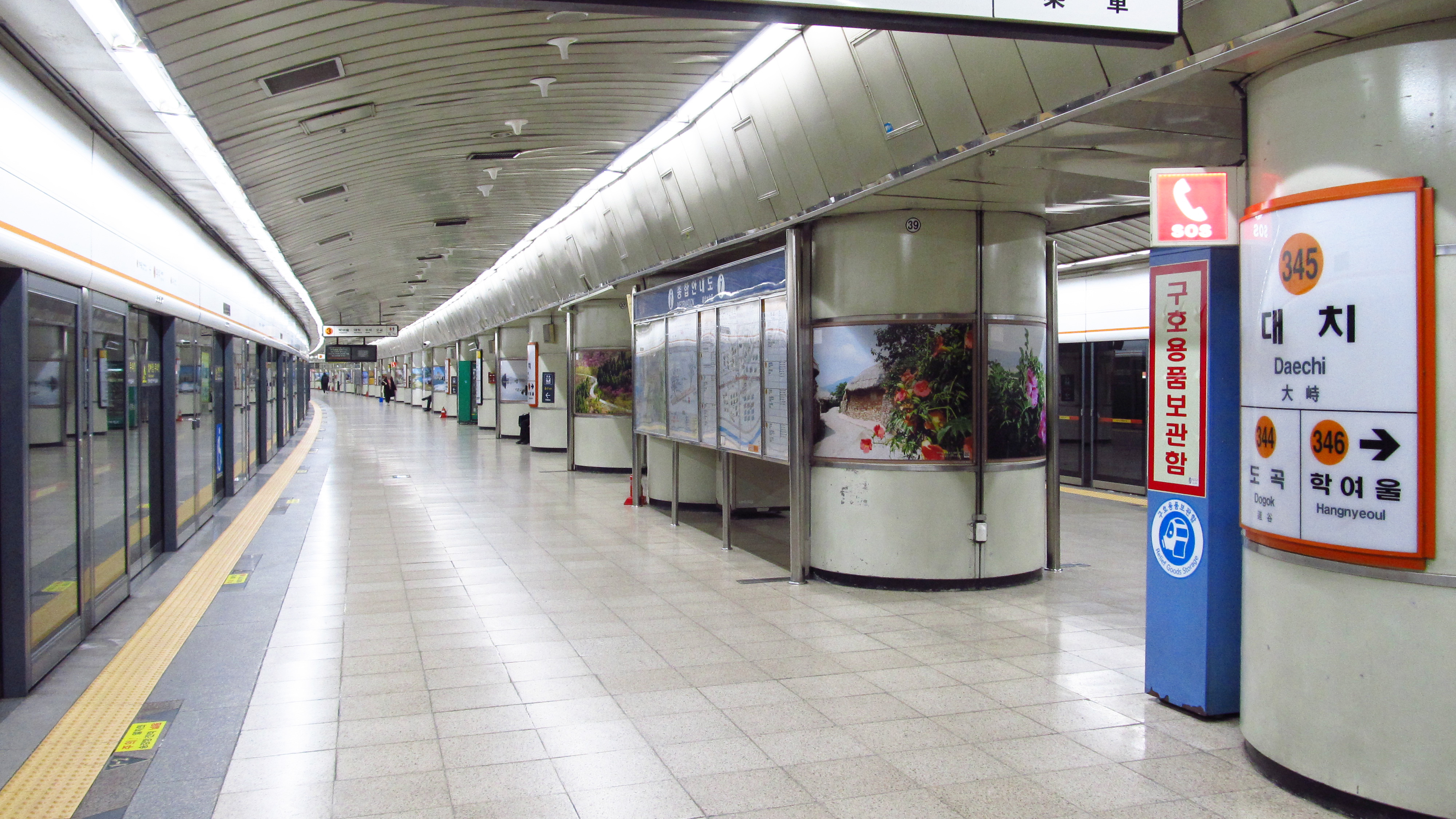

Korean name
- Hangul: 대치역
- Hanja: 大峙驛
- Revised Romanization: Daechi-yeok
- McCune–Reischauer: Taech'i-yŏk

General information
- Location: 509 Daechi 2-dong, 2952 Nambusunhwanno Jiha, Gangnam-gu, Seoul
- Coordinates: 37°29′40″N 127°03′48″E
- Operated by: Seoul Metro
- Line(s): Line 3
- Platforms: 1
- Tracks: 2

Construction
- Structure type: Underground

Key dates
- October 30, 1993: Line 3 opened

Passengers
- (Daily) Based on Jan-Dec of 2012. Line 3: 23,779

Daechi Station (Korean: 대치역) is a station on the Seoul Subway Line 3. It is located in Daechi-dong, Gangnam District, Seoul. It was named after a former village in the area, Hanti (한티), as Daechi is the Chinese reading of the hanja. The name of the station is Chinese characters, meaning "big hill."

== Station layout ==
G	Street level	Exit

L1; Concourse	Lobby	Customer Service, Shops, Vending machines, ATMs

L2; Platform	Northbound	← Line 3 toward Daehwa (Dogok)
L2; Platform	Island platform, doors will open on the left
L2; Platform	Southbound	Line 3 toward Ogeum (Hangnyeoul) →

== Vicinity ==
- Exit 1 : Cheongsil APT
- Exit 2 : Kukje APT
- Exit 3 :
- Exit 4 : Eunma APT
- Exit 5 : Daegok Elementary School, Mido APT
- Exit 6 :
- Exit 7 : Daechi Elementary School
- Exit 8 :

Preceding station	Seoul Metropolitan Subway	Following station
Dogok towards Daehwa	Line 3	Hangnyeoul towards Ogeum
