= Yongdonggung =

Korean royal residence

- Hangul: 용동궁
- Hanja: 龍洞宮
- RR: Yongdonggung
- MR: Yongdonggung

Yongdonggung (Korean: 용동궁; Hanja: 龍洞宮) was a Korean royal residence in Seoul where Crown Prince Sunhoe (Sunhoe Seja) of the Joseon dynasty once lived. The current address of the place where the residence was is 73, Suseong-dong neighborhood, Jongno-gu district, Seoul, South Korea. Originally it spanned the neighborhoods of Seosomun-dong and Jeong-dong of Jung-gu district. Yongdonggung was known as "Crown Prince Sunhoe's palace" (Sunhoe Sejagung) because the prince who lived there had the title of crown prince. However, as the prince died aged 12, he was buried in the area of Gyeongnueng where the tomb of Deokjong, the father of King Sejo is.

Ownership of the palace was transferred to the queen and its building was moved to Sujinbang (today's Suseong-dong area). It existed until 1908 when Sookmyung Girls' School was established on the site.

== See also ==
- Unhyeongung
