= Pandora TV =

South Korean company

- Type: Private
- Traded as: KRX: 202960
- Industry: Internet video sharing
- Founded: October 2004
- Defunct: January 31, 2023
- Headquarters: Bundang District, Seongnam, Gyeonggi Province, South Korea
- Key people: Peter Kim, Founder and CEO; Samuel Lee, COO
- Number of employees: 120 (2008)
- Website: www.pandora.tv

Pandora TV (Korean: 판도라TV) was a South Korean video sharing website that hosted user-generated content. Founded in October 2004, Pandora TV is the first video sharing website in the world to attach advertisement to user-submitted video clips and to provide unlimited storage space for users to upload. The operating company, Pandora TV Co., Ltd., has its headquarters in the Seoul-Gangnam Building in Yeoksam-dong, Gangnam District, Seoul.

In 2007, it was the fastest growing website in South Korea. In 2008, it was the largest video sharing website in South Korea, and it had 3.6 million members. At the time, it had 35% of the Korean marketshare for video sharing sites.

The site was available in Korean, and after April 2008, in English, Chinese, and Japanese.

Pandora TV raised over $16 million from Silicon Valley venture capital firms – Altos Ventures and DCM - in two consecutive funding rounds 2006 and 2007, which represents the largest foreign investment made so far on any Korean Internet start-up.

On January 31, 2023, Pandora TV ended its service.

== Company history ==
- October 2004 – Launched video sharing portal Pandora TV
- October 2005 – Launched iCF ad format
- October 2005 – Changed the corporate name from Lettee.com to Pandora TV Co.
- June 2006 – Completed Series A financing of over $6 million from a Silicon Valley–based investment group led by Altos Ventures
- April 2007 – Completed Series B financing of $10 million led by DCM (formerly known as Doll Capital Management)
- December 2007 – Selected as one of the Top 100 Global Tech Startups in 2007 by Red Herring
- December 2007 – Launched Pandora TV Global Beta service
- March 2008 – Acquired The K-Multimedia Player, a premium video player solution
- April 2008 – Officially launched Pandora TV global service offered in four languages (English, Chinese, Japanese and Korean)
- July 2015 – Pandora TV uses Youtube to host it's videos and is no longer an independent platform
- January 31, 2023 – Pandora TV service ended, and users get redirected to Moviebloc.com.

== Logo ==
2006–2012

2013–2014

2016–2023

2016–2023 (mobile)

== See also ==
- K-Multimedia Player
- YouTube
