= Poi-dong =

Neighbourhood in Seoul, South Korea

- Country: South Korea

Korean name
- Hangul: 포이동
- Hanja: 浦二洞
- RR: Poi-dong
- MR: P'oi-dong

Poi-dong (Korean: 포이동) is a former neighbourhood (dong) of Gangnam District, Seoul, South Korea until December 31, 2007. It is merged into Gaepo-dong.
