= Sookmyung Girls' Middle School =

Sookmyung Girls' Middle School 숙명여자중학교

Location
- 2807 Nambusunhwan-ro, Gangnam-gu; Seoul; South Korea
- 37.4907289°N 127.0533366°E

Information
- Type: Private
- Motto: 밝고 다습고 씩씩하게 나라를 사랑하자. 민족을 사랑하자. 자기와 가정과 학교를 사랑하자. (Let us be bright, diligent, and spirited, and love our country. Let us love our nation, and cherish ourselves, our families and our school.)
- Established: 1906-05-22
- Chairperson: Seo Eun-kyung (서은경)
- Principal: Kim So-young (김소영)
- Gender: Girls
- Enrollment: 925
- Website: https://sookmyung.sen.ms.kr/

Korean name
- Hangul: 숙명여자중학교
- Hanja: 淑明女子中學校
- RR: Sungmyeong yeoja junghakgyo
- MR: Sungmyŏng yŏja chunghakkyo

Sookmyung Girls' Middle School (Korean: 숙명여자중학교; Hanja: 淑明女子中學校) is a private girls middle school located in Gangnam-gu, Seoul, South Korea.

== History ==
Sookmyung Girls' School traces its origins to 22 May 1906, when it was founded as Private Myeongsin Girls' School with land, buildings, and financial support from Empress Sunheon. Lee Jeong-suk served as the first principal. In 1907, the institution received approximately 1,000 jeongbo of farmland in Jaeryeong and Sincheon counties in Hwanghae Province and in Paju County, Gyeonggi Province, granted by the former Yeongchinwanggung. The school adopted the name Private Sookmyung Girls' High School in 1909.

The Sookmyung Foundation was established on 1 January 1912, based on property granted by the former Gyeongseonggung and Yeongchinwanggung, with the Minister of the Imperial Household appointed as its first chairperson. Students played an active role in national events; around 200 participated in the independence movement in 1919. During the 1920s, the school created its emblem and designated the magnolia as its flower, and in 1927 students organized a strike opposing Japanization policies in education. The uniform was changed from traditional hanbok to a sailor-style design in 1931, and the Lee Jeong-suk Scholarship Association was founded in 1936. Sookmyung Women's College, later Sookmyung Women's University, was established in 1939.

Following liberation, Moon Nam-sik became the 5th principal in 1947, when the school motto and anthem were also established. The table tennis team achieved national success in 1947 and 1948. During the Korean War, the school temporarily relocated to Busan. After educational reforms in 1951, the middle and high school programs were reorganized into three-year courses. The First World Children's Art Exhibition was held in 1955, and the school newspaper Sookran began publication in 1956.

In 1961, UNESCO designated the school as a model institution for international understanding, and Lee Ye-haeng became the 6th principal later that year. Under the middle school equalization policy, ten 1st grade classes were assigned in 1969, though this number was reduced to 5 in 1971 due to government policy. The school recorded the nation's highest advancement rate to high schools in 1973, the same year Kim Jeong-sun became the 7th principal. Sookmyung celebrated its 70th anniversary in 1976, and Jeong Chung-ryang became the 8th principal in 1977.

A major relocation occurred in 1980, when the school moved from Susong-dong in Jongno-gu to its current site in Dogok-dong, Gangnam-gu. The Jang Geum-san and Yoon Deok-ju Memorial Halls opened in 1981. By 1982, the middle school had expanded to 30 classes, and in 1983 the middle and high schools were administratively separated, with Jeong Sun-hee appointed as the 9th principal. The Lee Jeong-suk Memorial Hall (auditorium) opened in 1984, and Song Geun-ju became the 10th principal in 1987. Additional facilities, including the An In-ja Memorial Hall in 1991 and the Alumni Hall in 1994, were completed during this period. Kwon Myeong-gyu and Ahn Myeong-gyeong served as the 11th and 12th principals, respectively, beginning in 1993 and 1998.

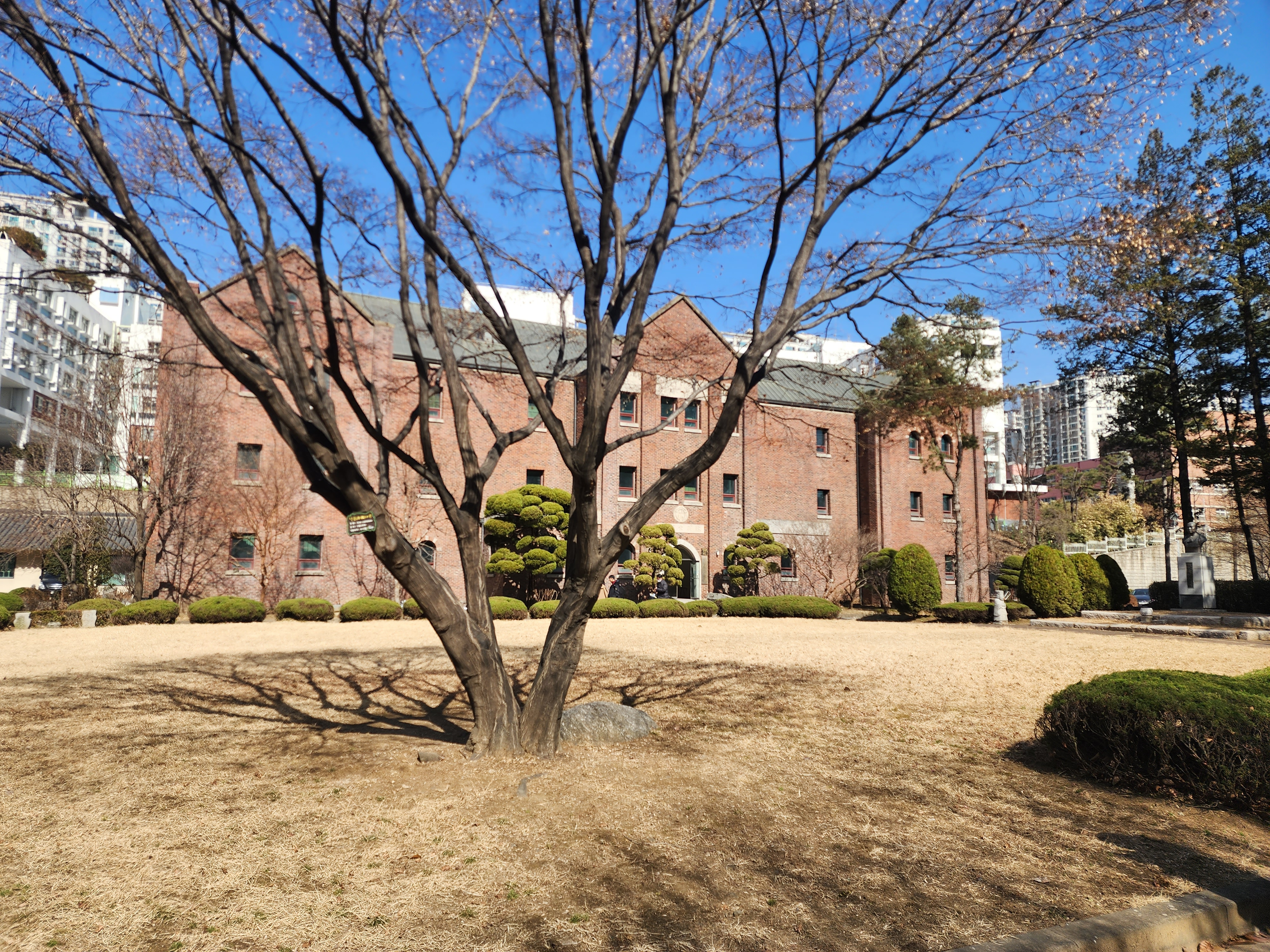
The library of the school. The facility is jointly used by Sookmyung Girls' Middle School and Sookmyung Girls' High School.

In 1999, nine 1st grade classes were assigned, and Ham In-suk became the 13th principal. The early 2000s saw improvements to school infrastructure, including expanded digital library facilities in 2001 and accessibility upgrades in 2003. The school was selected for a library remodeling project in 2004. Sookmyung marked its centennial in 2006, and Cho Mi-haeng became the 14th principal in 2009.

A major organizational change occurred in 2013, when the school separated from the Sookmyung Foundation and the Myeongsin Language Academy Foundation was established, with Lee Jeong-ja as its 1st chairperson. The school received a commendation for excellence in student counselling and educational program management in 2014. Cho Hee-suk became the 15th principal in 2016, and Ahn Myeong-gyeong was appointed the foundation's 2nd chairperson in 2018. Ryu Hyun-mi was assumed as the 16th principal in 2020, followed by Kim So-young in 2024. Seo Eun-kyung became the foundation's 3rd chairperson in 2025.

== Alumni ==
- Chang Sang, theologian, pastor, educator, politician
- Choi Seung-hee, dancer, defected to North Korea
- Heo Ji-won, member of Cherrybullet
- Kang Eun-bi, actress
- Kang Keum-sil, politician
- Kim Ji-young, actress
- Kim Jung-sook, Wife of President Moon Jae-in; the First Lady of the Republic of Korea.
- Kim So-hye, member of I.O.I, actress
- Lee A-hyeon, actress
- Park Wan-suh, novelist
- Ryu Hyun-kyung, actress
- Sohn Hye-won, politician

== Available Public Transportation ==
=== Bus ===
Bus Stops	Route number
Chung-Ang University High School (23-220/23-233)	242, 2415, 3414, 3426, 4432, G3202
Sookmyung Girls' High School (23-329) Military Mutual Aid Association Building (23-227)	2413, 3414, 3420, 402, 4319, N37, 6009, G3202
Dogok Station (23-219/23-228)	2413, 402, 4319, N37, Gangnam 10, 6009, 11-3

=== Subway ===
- Seoul Metro Line 3: Dogok Station
- Suin-Bundang Line: Dogok Station

== See also ==
- Sookmyung Women's University
- Sookmyung Girls' High School
