= Segok-dong =

Neighbourhood in Seoul, South Korea

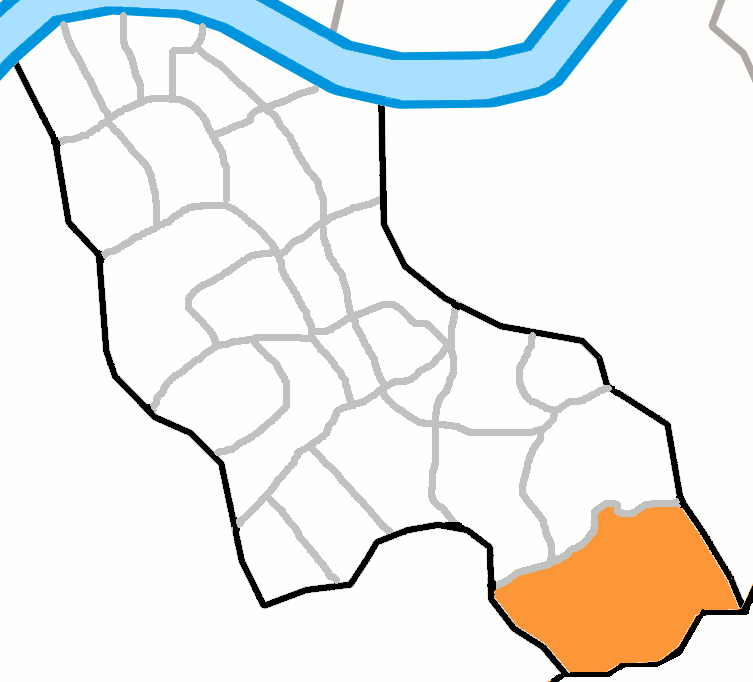

- Location within Seoul Location within South Korea
- Country: South Korea

Area
  - Total: 6.36 km^{2} (2.46 sq mi)

Population (2001)
  - Total: 6,884
  - Density: 1,082/km^{2} (2,800/sq mi)

Korean name
- Hangul: 세곡동
- Hanja: 細谷洞
- RR: Segok-dong
- MR: Segok-tong

Segok-dong (Korean: 세곡동) is a ward of Gangnam District, Seoul, South Korea. It is the most rural neighbourhood in Gangnam District.

== Education ==
There are four schools located in Segok-dong, Seoul Jagok Elementary School, Seoul Semyung Elementary School, Seoul Daewang Elementary School and Segok Middle School.

== See also ==
- Dong of Gangnam District
