= Hakdong Park =

Park in Gangnam, Seoul, South Korea

- Type: Public park
- Location: Nonhyeon-dong, Gangnam District, Seoul, South Korea
- Coordinates: 37.51570°N 127.02542°E
- Area: 2.9947 hectares (7.400 acres)
- Established: January 15, 1985

Hakdong Park (Korean: 학동공원) is a public park in Nonhyeon-dong, Gangnam District, Seoul, South Korea. It first opened on January 15, 1985, and has an area of 29,947 square meters (322,350 sq ft).

The park is a ten-minute walk from Exit 1 of Sinsa station.

== Description ==
The park has a number of facilities for exercise and leisure. It has one badminton court and a playground. A pavilion, benches, and pergolas are available in the park for rest. The park is hilly, and has a number of trails. The park is surrounded by a residential area, so is popular with the locals.

The park is notable to fans of the band BTS because members of the band used to frequent the park when they were trainees and use its swings. As such, tourists have taken photographs of themselves on the same swings. The park was featured in an episode of Run BTS in 2022 (Telepathy Part 2).

== History ==
The area the park was on previously was used by the military. As Seoul sprawled into Gangnam over time, the area became surrounded by residential buildings. Locals found the lack of nearby greenspace to be frustrating. At first, residents received part of the area as a park, but activities were sometimes restricted due to the military. Eventually, the Gangnam District council advocated on behalf of the locals to reduce the military presence in the area.
