= Chang Sang =

Prime Minister of South Korea in 2002

- 장상
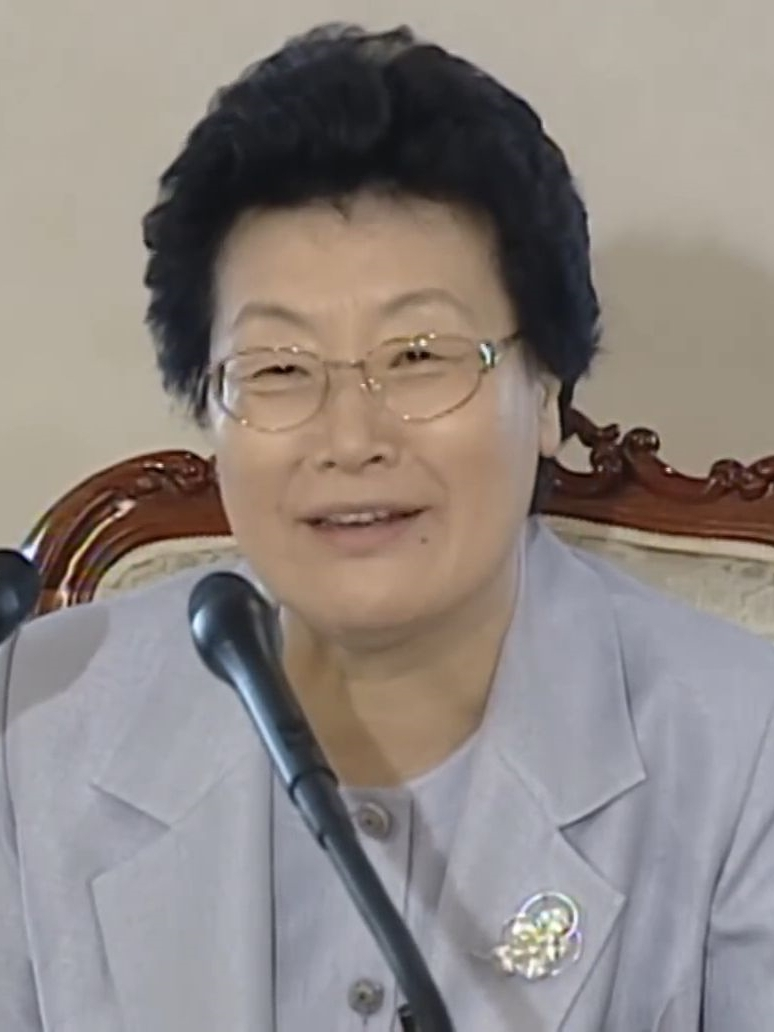
- Chang in 2002

Acting Prime Minister of South Korea
- In office 11 July 2002 – 31 July 2002
- President: Kim Dae-jung
- Preceded by: Lee Han-dong
- Succeeded by: Jeon Yun-churl (acting)

Personal details
- Born: 3 October 1939 (age 87) Ryūsen-gun, Korea, Empire of Japan
- Party: Democratic Party
- Education: Ewha Womans University (BS); Yale University (MDiv); Princeton University (PhD)

Korean name
- Hangul: 장상
- Hanja: 張裳
- RR: Jang Sang
- MR: Chang Sang

Chang Sang (Korean: 장상; born 3 October 1939) is a South Korean academic and politician who briefly served as the first female prime minister of South Korea when president Kim Dae-jung reshuffled his cabinet in July 2002.

She holds a doctorate of philosophy from Princeton Theological Seminary and served as president of Ewha Womans University from 1996 until the prime minister appointment.

She was nominated as the prime minister candidate by the President Kim Dae-jung in 2002, however the nomination was rejected by the National Assembly.

== Education ==
- Graduated, Sookmyung Girls' High School
- Bachelor of Science in Mathematics, Ewha Womans University
- Master of Divinity, Yale Divinity School at Yale University
- Doctor of Philosophy in Theology, Princeton Theological Seminary

== Election results ==
Year	Elections	Constituency	Political party	Votes (%)	Results
2010	2010 By-election	Eunpyeong B (Seoul)	Democratic	33,048 (39.90%)	Defeated (2nd)

Political offices
Preceded by Lee Han-dong	Prime Minister of South Korea; Acting; 2002	Succeeded by Jeon Yun-churl; Acting
