= Dankook Middle School =

Male secondary school in South Korea

- Hangul: 단국대학교사범대학부속중학교
- Hanja: 檀國大學校師範大學附屬中學校
- RR: Danguk daehakgyo sabeom daehak busok junghakgyo
- MR: Tan'guk taehakkyo sabŏm taehak pusok chunghakkyo

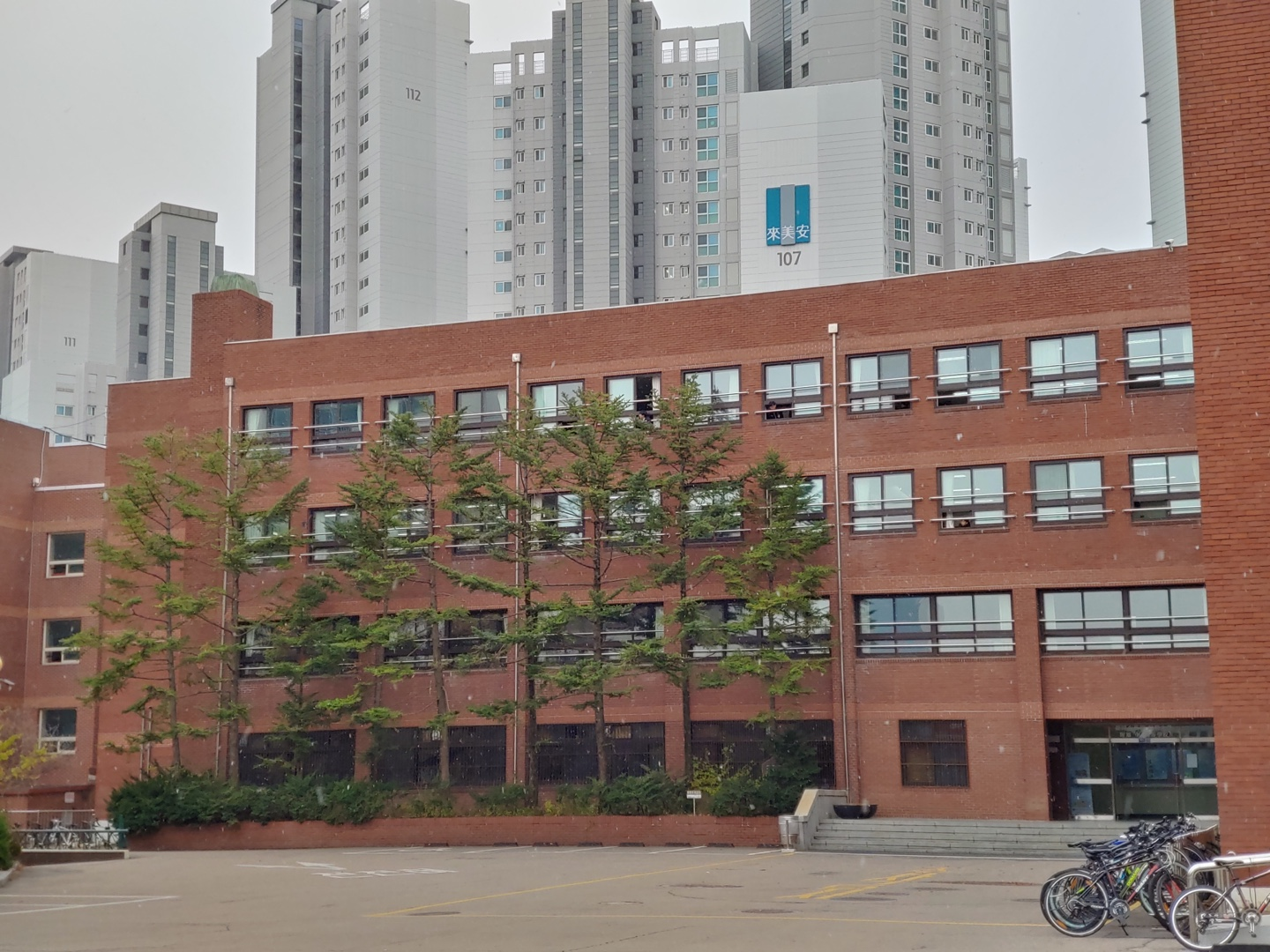
Dankook University's College of Education Affiliated Middle School on snowy day

Dankook Middle School (Korean: 단국대학교사범대학부속중학교) is a boys-only middle school located in Daechi-dong, Gangnam District, Seoul, South Korea. It is a private school attached to Dankook University. It was first founded on December 26, 1983. The school motto is to "know myself, live with virtue, and study while working". The school's symbol tree, flower, and mascot is the zelkova, the royal azalea, and the bear, respectively.

== Principals ==
  1959–1964 1st Sung Girl Jung (정성걸)
  1964–1964 2nd Bong Shik Jang (장봉식)
  1964–1965 3rd Dong Shik Ji (지동식)
  1965–1968 4th Jong Hub Lee (이종업)
  1968–1969 5th Bong Shik Jang (장봉식)
  1969–1972 6th Bok Young Lee (이복녕)
  1972–1977 7th Jong Duck Yey (이종덕)
  1977–1990 8th Bok Young Lee (이복녕)
  1990–2004 9th Bong Shik Jang (장봉식)
  2004–2006 10th Hun Sang Shin (신헌상)
  2006–2008 11th Hun Suek Min (민헌숙)
  2008–2012 12th Sang Sue Kim (김상수)
  -2024 Yoo Soo Han (한유수)

== Awards ==
- 12th National Astronomy Olympiad, gold medal
- 3rd Asian-Atlantic Astronomy Olympiad, 1st
- Other Olympiad awards 54, the best in the country
- 4th long-basketball tournament, 1st
- 62nd middle school girls and boys basketball, 1st
- 54 other Olympiad awards

== Student exchange ==
In spring, around 40 students from Buensan Middle School come to Dankook Middle School, while in the fall around 40 Dankook students go to Buensan middle school for two days.

== School Symbol ==
The school symbol derives from the Obangsaek, a traditional Korean color spectrum. It has red, blue, black, and white colors around a yellow centerpiece containing letter for "middle". Red represents a phoenix; blue, a blue dragon; white, a white tiger; and black, a turtle. The yellow in the middle represents the yellow dragon: a symbol for the school's students, while the Chinese character means that Dankook students should be at the center of the world.

== See also ==
- Education in South Korea
