= Seolleung station =

Line 2 station on the Seoul Subway

Coordinates: 37°30′16.02″N 127°2′56.35″E

선릉 (애큐온저축은행); Seolleung (Acuon Savings Bank)
선릉; Seolleung
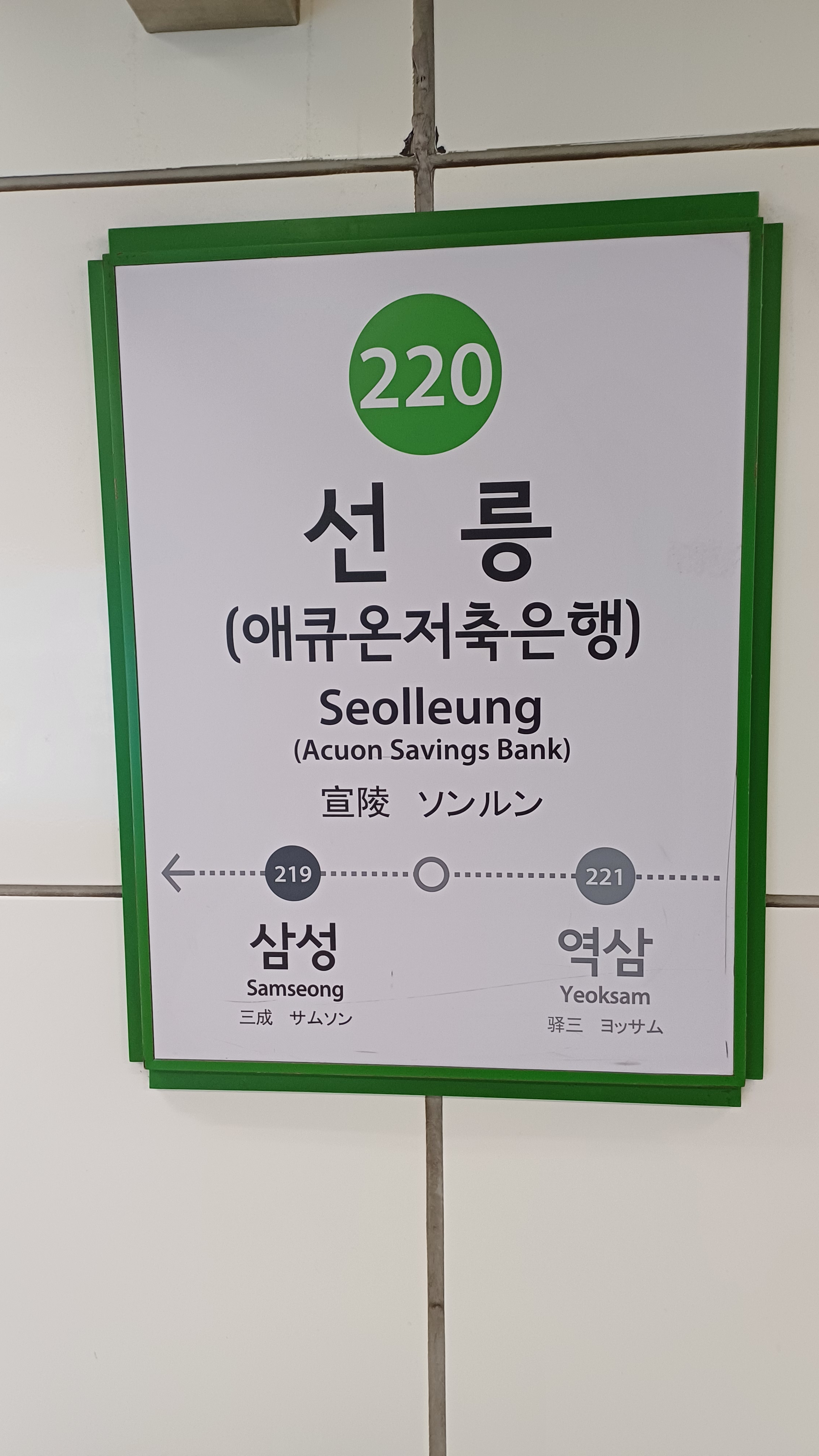
- Station Sign (Line 2)

Korean name
- Hangul: 선릉역
- Hanja: 宣陵驛
- Revised Romanization: Seolleung-yeok
- McCune–Reischauer: Sŏllŭng-yŏk

General information
- Location: 143-42 Samseong 2-dong, 340 Teherandaero Jiha, Gangnam-gu, Seoul
- Operator: Seoul Metro; Korail
- Lines: Line 2 Suin–Bundang Line
- Platforms: 4
- Tracks: 4

Construction
- Structure type: Underground

Key dates
- December 23, 1982: Line 2 opened
- September 3, 2003: Suin–Bundang Line opened

Passengers
- (Daily) Based on Jan-Dec of 2012. Line 2: 117,787; Bundang Line: 15,715
Services
Preceding station	Seoul Metropolitan Subway	Following station
Samseong Next counterclockwise	Line 2	Yeoksam Next clockwise
Seonjeongneung towards Cheongnyangni	Suin–Bundang Line	Hanti towards Incheon
Location

Seolleung station is a Seoul Subway station that serves Line 2 and the Suin–Bundang Line. The station is named after the nearby Seolleung, a Joseon period royal tomb.

On Line 2, the preceding and following stations are Yeoksam station and Samseong station. On the Suin-Bundang Line these are Seonjeongneung station, which connects with Line 9, and Hanti station.

== Facilities ==
- In 2011, retailer Home plus opened the world's first virtual supermarket in the station, where smartphone users can photograph the bar codes of life-size pictures, on the walls and platform screen doors, of 500 items of food, toiletries, electronics etc., for delivery within the same day. However, the Home plus virtual supermarket is currently closed and no longer exists(2023).
- There is a convenience store called Storyway near Suin–Bundang Line ticket gate.
- Restrooms are located outside the ticket gate, and there are a total of two, one near Line 2 ticket gate and the other near Suin–Bundang Line ticket gate.

== Passenger load ==
In a survey conducted in 2011 by the Ministry of Land, Transport and Maritime Affairs on 92 Administrative divisions across the country, it reported that Seolleung Station is the fourth-busiest public transit stop following Gangnam Station, Jamsil Station, Sadang Station; and followed by Sillim Station.

== Gallery ==
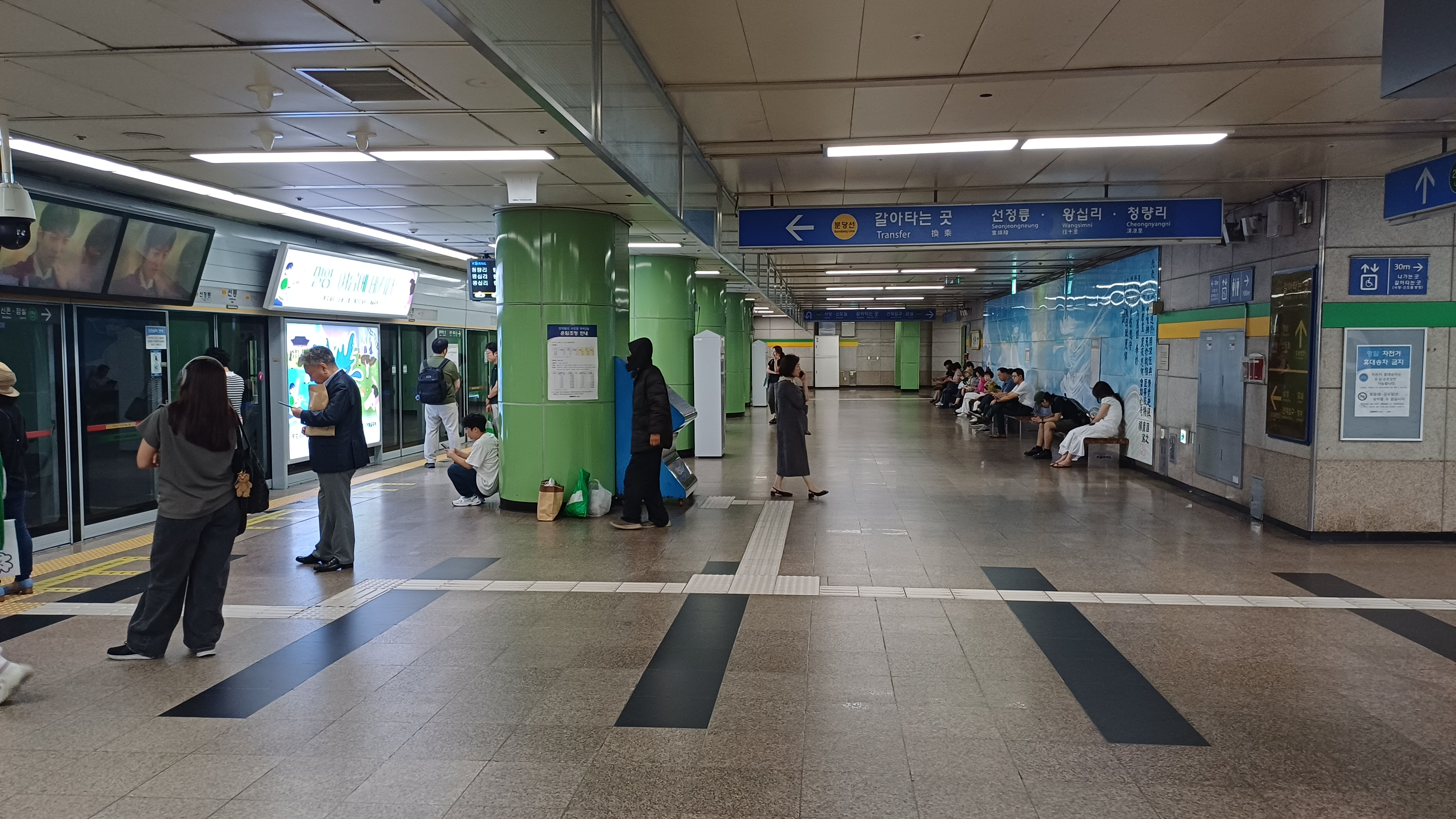
Suin-Bundang Line platform

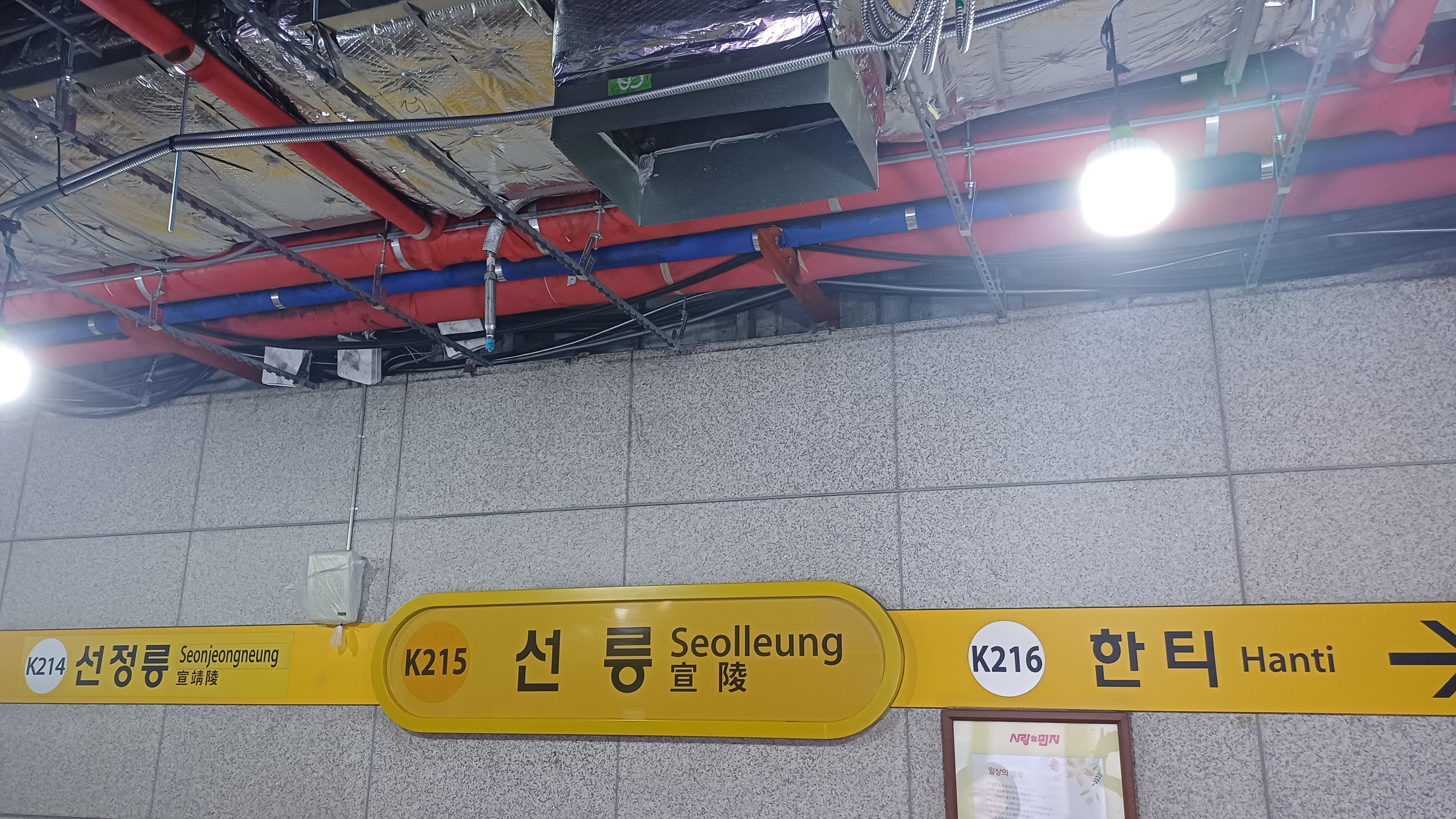
Suin-Bundang Line station sign

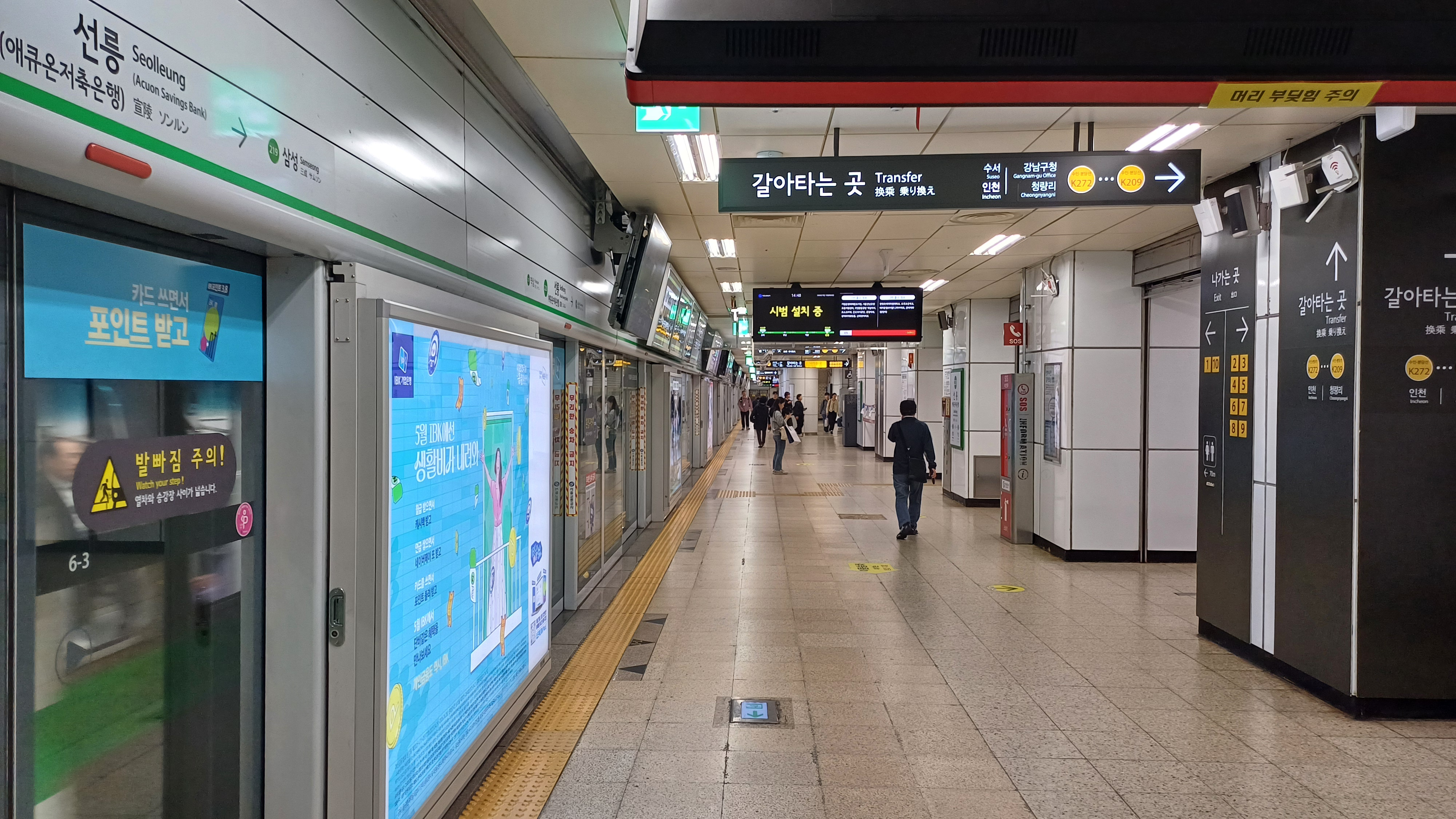
Line 2 platform

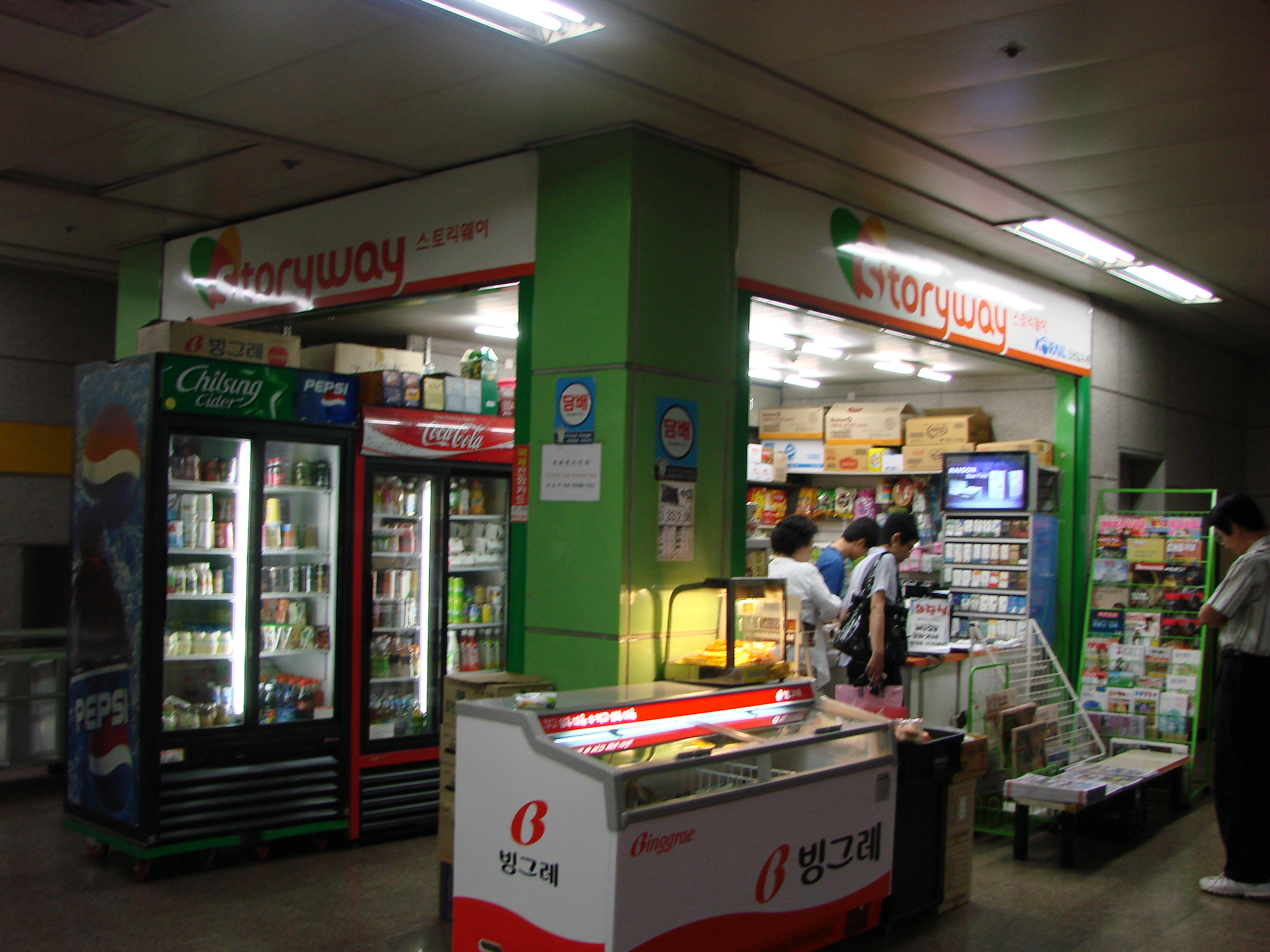
