= Sookmyung Girls' High School =

Sookmyung Girls' High School 숙명여자고등학교

Location
- 2807 Nambusunhwan-ro, Gangnam-gu; Seoul; South Korea; 37.4907289°N 127.0533366°E

Information
- Type: Private
- Motto: 밝고 다습고 씩씩하게 나라를 사랑하자. 민족을 사랑하자. 자기와 가정과 학교를 사랑하자. (Let us be bright, diligent, and spirited, and love our country. Let us love our nation, and cherish ourselves, our families and our school.)
- Established: 1906-05-22
- Chairperson: Seo Eun-kyung (서은경)
- Principal: Lee Hye-sook (이혜숙)
- Deputy Principal: Cha Se-il (차세일)
- Gender: Girls
- Enrollment: 1,249
- Website: www.sookmyung.hs.kr

Korean name
- Hangul: 숙명여자고등학교
- Hanja: 淑明女子高等學校
- RR: Sungmyeong yeoja godeunghakgyo
- MR: Sungmyŏng yŏja kodŭnghakkyo

Sookmyung Girls' High School (Korean: 숙명여자고등학교; Hanja: 淑明女子高等學校) is a private girls high school located in Gangnam-gu, Seoul, South Korea.

== History ==
Sookmyung Girls' High School traces its origins to 22 May 1906, when it was founded as Myeongsin Girls' School (Korean: 명신여학교; Hanja: 明新女學校) at Yongdonggung Palace. In May 1909, the institution adopted the name Sookmyung Girls' High School. The school's foundation was strengthened in January 1912 with the establishment of the Sookmyung Foundation, supported by property from the former Gyeongseon and Yeongchinwang Palaces.

Following Korea's liberation, the school underwent significant administrative changes, Moon Nam-sik became the 5th principal in April 1947. Under the 1951 Education Act, the original six-year program was reorganized into Sookmyung Girls' Middle School and Sookmyung Girls' High School, each operating a three-year curriculum. Lee Ye-haeng was assumed as the 6th principal in October 1961.

By December 1970, the high school operated 36 classes, with 12 per grade. Kim Jeong-sun became the 7th principal in April 1973, and the school adjusted to the national high school equalization policy in March 1974.

The school marked its 70th anniversary in May 1976, followed by the appointment of Chung Chung-ryang as the 8th principal in July 1977. A major milestone occurred in March 1981, when the school relocated from Susong-dong, Jongno-gu, to its current campus in Dogok-dong, Gangnam-gu. The Lee Jeong-suk Memorial Hall opened in October 1984, and the 80th anniversary school magazine was published in December 1986. Class sizes expanded again in March 1988, and Lee Jung-ja became the 9th principal later that year.

The school continued to grow through the 1990s, operating 45 classes by March 1990. The An In-ja Memorial Hall (1991) and the Alumni Hall (1994) were completed during this period. The 90th anniversary history volume was published in May 1996.

Leadership changes included Kwon Myung-kyu becoming the 10th principal in March 1998, and Ahn Myung-kyung becoming the 11th principal in September 1999, coinciding with the completion of the student cafeteria. Class sizes fluctuated in the early 2000s, and the Education Information Center was completed in September 2002.

By March 2006, the school operated 48 classes, and its 100th anniversary commemorative album and ceremony were completed in May 2006. Lee Don-hee became the 12th principal in March 2007.

Throughout the 2010s, class numbers gradually decreased. In March 2013, the Myeongsin Girls' School Foundation was established, with Lee Jeong-ja as its 1st chairperson. Heo Young-suk became the 13th principal in March 2015, and Lee Hye-suk became the 14th principal in September 2018, when Ahn Myeong-gyeong also became the chairperson of the foundation. By March 2020, the school operated 42 classes, with 14 per grade.

== Cultural Heritage ==
=== Overview ===
The school preserves three early artifacts from Myeongsin Girls' School (Korean: 명신여학교; Hanja: 明新女學校), which was founded in May 1906 by Sunheon Hwang-Gwi-bi Eom. The collection consists of a Taegeukgi (Korean national flag), a wooden signboard, and an official royal document (wanmun). These items are considered to have significant historical value in the

context of early modern education in Korea.

Taegeukgi, the national flag of the Republic of Korea

=== Taegeukgi ===
The Taegeukgi includes the handwritten inscription “明新女學校” and was produced using a printing technique that employed a frame for the Taegeuk emblem and the four trigrams. It is notable for its use of pigments that were uncommon at the time, for the distinctive arrangement of the trigrams, and for being the earliest known Taegeukgi discovered in an educational setting.

=== Wooden Signboard ===
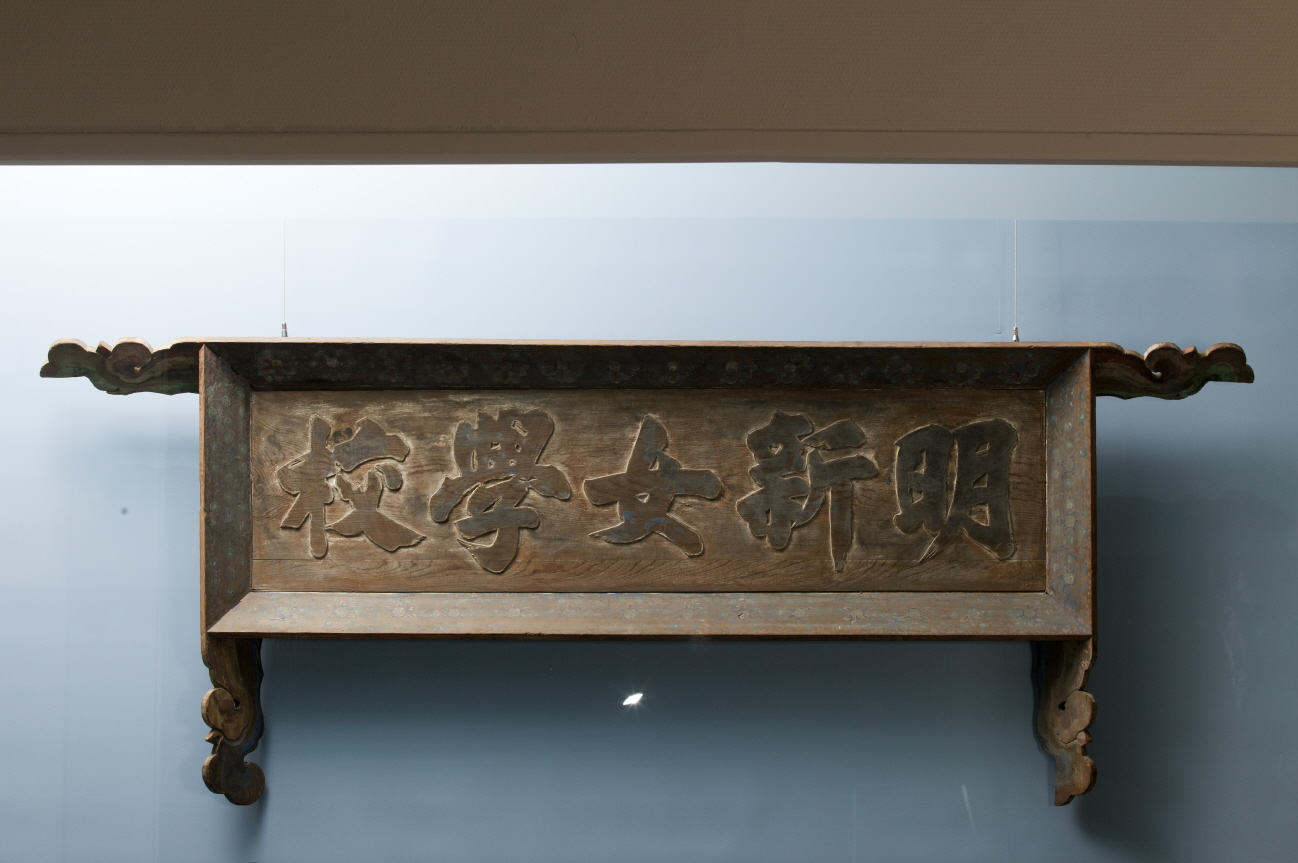
Wooden Signboard of Myeongsin Girls' School

The wooden signboard features the characters “明新女學校” carved in relief. Its four edges

follow the typical framing style of royal signboards from the Joseon period, and it is decorated with floral (花草紋) and cloud-head (雲頭紋) motifs in color.

=== Wanmun ===
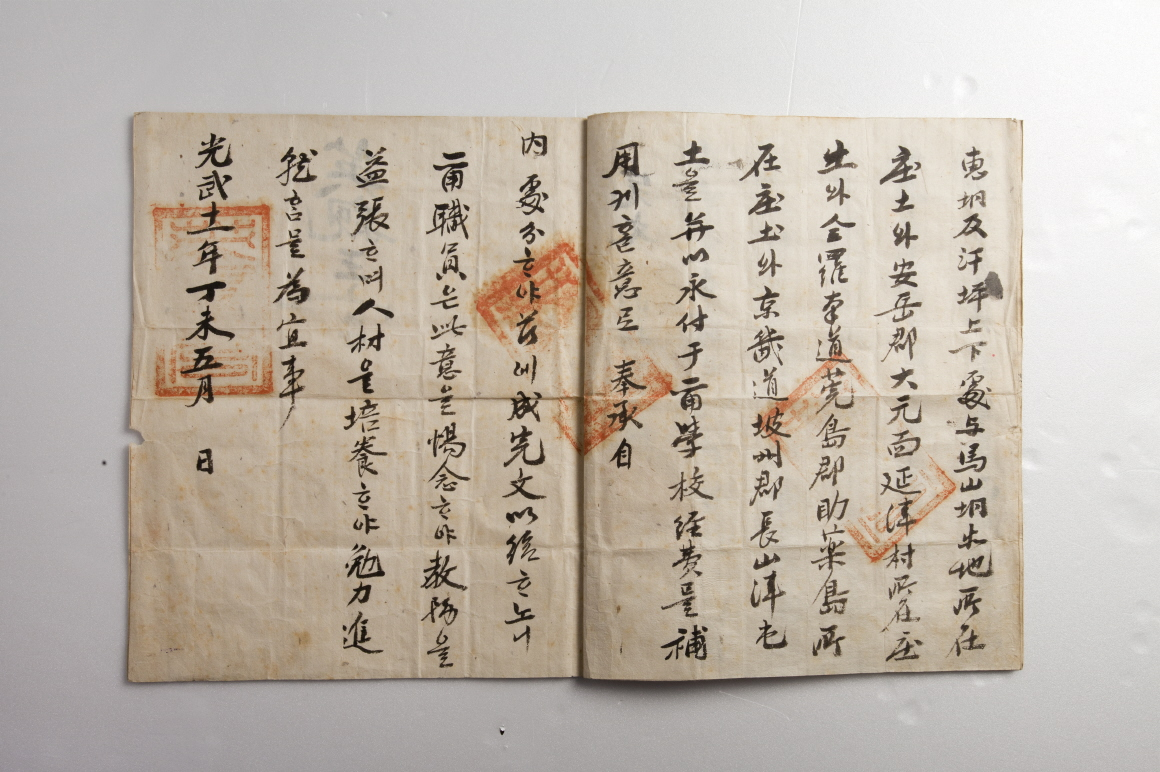
Wanmun, an imperial document demonstrating that the Imperial Household of the Korean Empire financially supported early modern educational institutions.

The wanmun, dated May 1907, is an official document issued by Yeonhchinwanggung (the

residence of Prince Yeongchin) granting land to support the operation of Myeongsin Girls' School. This document indicates that the Imperial Household of the Korean Empire provided financial support to schools established during the early development of modern education.

== Alumni ==
- Chang Sang, theologian, pastor, educator, politician
- Choi Seung-hee, dancer, defected to North Korea
- Cho Hyun-ok, ambassador Extraordinary and Plenipotentiary
- Cho Yu-jung, actress
- Han Mal-sook, novelist
- Kim Jung-sook, Wife of President Moon Jae-in; the First Lady of the Republic of Korea.
- Kim Min-jung, actress
- Kim Myeong-sun, writer, novelist, poet, journalist
- Kwon Ji-ye, novelist
- Myung Se-bin, actress
- Na Hyeon-hui, actress, singer
- Park Wan-suh, novelist
- Sohn Hye-won, designer, politician

== Available Public Transportation ==
=== Bus ===
Bus Stops	Route number
Chung-Ang University High School (23-220/23-233)	242, 2415, 3414, 3426, 4432, G3202
Sookmyung Girls' High School (23-329) Military Mutual Aid Association Building (23-227)	2413, 3414, 3420, 402, 4319, N37, 6009, G3202
Dogok Station (23-219/23-228)	2413, 402, 4319, N37, Gangnam 10, 6009, 11-3

=== Subway ===
- Seoul Metro Line 3: Dogok Station
- Suin-Bundang Line: Dogok Station

== See also ==
- Sookmyung Women's University
- Sookmyung Girls' Middle School
