= Yeoksam-dong =

Neighbourhood in Seoul, South Korea

Coordinates: 37°14′N 127°11′E

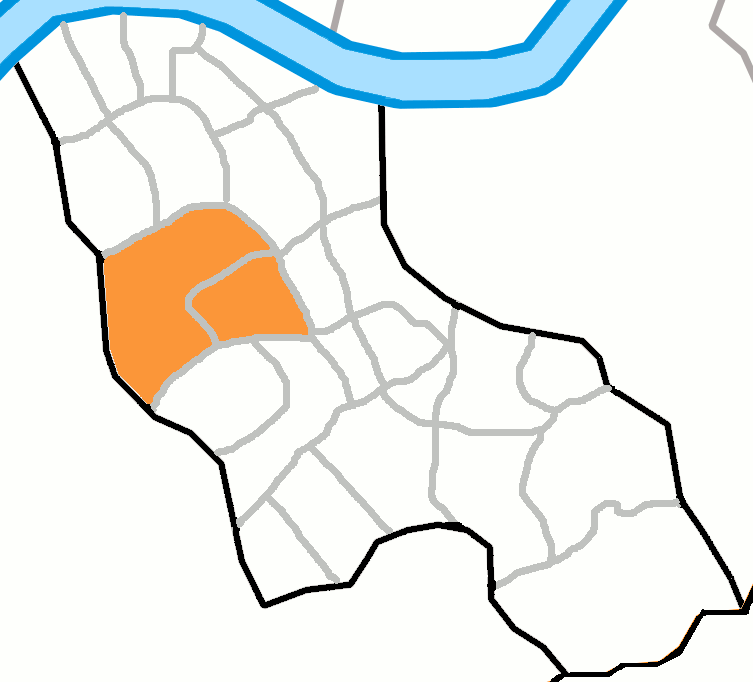
- Country: South Korea

Area
  - Total: 3.50 km^{2} (1.35 sq mi)

Population (2001)
  - Total: 60,774
  - Density: 17,364/km^{2} (44,970/sq mi)

Korean name
- Hangul: 역삼동
- Hanja: 驛三洞
- RR: Yeoksam-dong
- MR: Yŏksam-dong

Yeoksam-dong (Korean: 역삼동) is a ward of Gangnam District, Seoul, South Korea. Teheran-ro runs through Yeoksam-dong and has some of the tallest buildings in Seoul, comprising a collection of corporate headquarters and high-rise office buildings.

== History ==
The region was historically part of Gwacheon, but it later became part of Gwangju, Gyeonggi Province. The region originally was a hub in the horse road system that was created during the Joseon dynasty, and was home to three horse stations called yeoks. These were later merged as a single administrative division in 1914, and thus was called Yeoksamri. When it was initially incorporated into the Seoul metropolitan area in 1963, it was part of Seongdong district but it was later transferred to Gangnam district in 1975.

== Economy ==
T'way Airlines has its headquarters in Yeoksam-dong. Pandora TV has its headquarters in the Seoul-Gangnam Building in Yeoksam-dong.

AMI Korea, a subsidiary of American Megatrends, is headquartered on the third floor of 773-6 Yeoksam-dong. Google has an office in Yeoksam-dong. Kukkiwon (the World Taekwondo Headquarters) is based at 635 Yeoksam-dong. Hankook P&G, a subsidiary of Procter & Gamble, is headquartered on the 16th floor of the ING tower at 679-4 Yeoksam-dong. C-JeS Entertainment is at 629-7 Yeoksam 1-dong. Pledis Entertainment is at 135-907 Yeoksam-dong.

== Education ==
Schools located in Yeoksam-dong:

- Seoul Yeoksam Elementary School
- Seoul Doseong Elementary School
- Yeoksam Middle School
- Jinseon Girls' Middle School
- Jinseon Girls' High School

== See also ==
- Korea
- Dong of Gangnam District
- Administrative divisions of South Korea
