= Irwon-dong =

Neighborhood in Seoul, South Korea

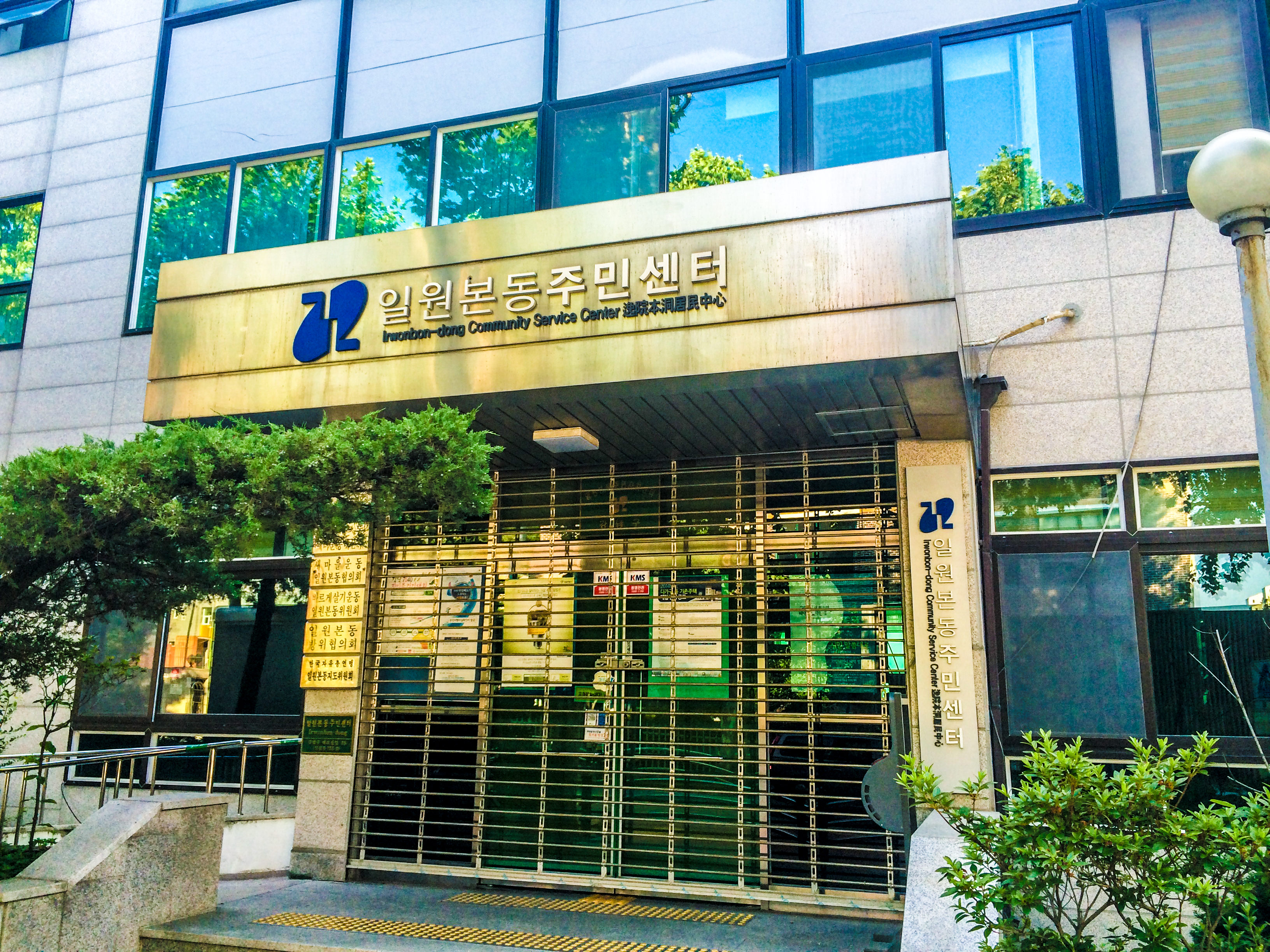
- Irwonbon-dong Community Service Center

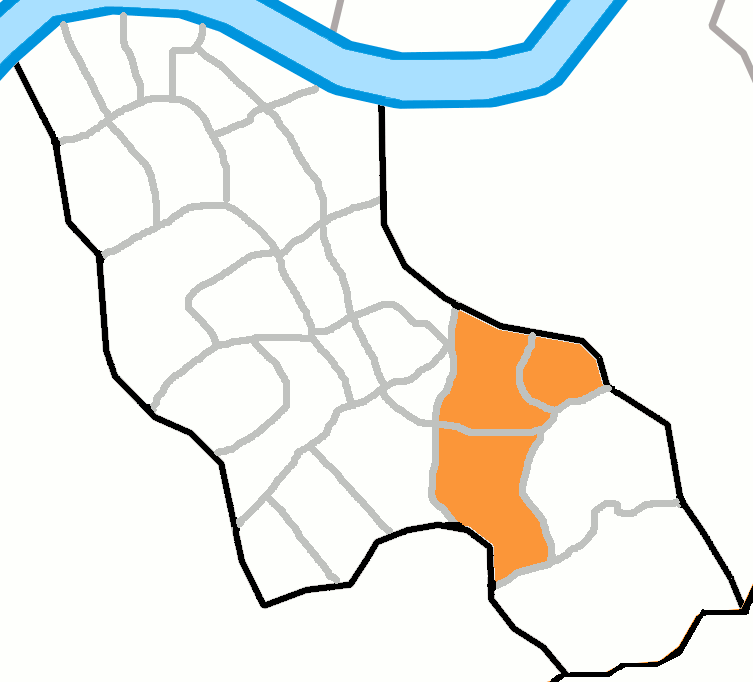
- Country: South Korea

Area
  - Total: 4.74 km^{2} (1.83 sq mi)

Population (2001)
  - Total: 68,018
  - Density: 14,350/km^{2} (37,200/sq mi)

Korean name
- Hangul: 일원동
- Hanja: 逸院洞
- RR: Irwon-dong
- MR: Irwŏn-dong

Irwon-dong (Korean: 일원동) is a dong (neighborhood) of Gangnam District, Seoul, South Korea.

== Education ==
Schools located in Irwon-dong:

- Daemo Elementary School
- Daecheong Elementary School
- Irwon Elementary School
- Younghee Elementary School
- Joongdong Middle School
- Jungsan High School
- Joongdong High School
- Seoul Robotics High School
- Miral School

== Transportation ==
The area is served by Deachung Station and Irwon Station on the Seoul Subway Line 3, and Seoul buses.

== Notable people from Irwon-dong ==
- Lee Ha-na (Korean: 이하나), South Korean actress
- Huh Yunjin (Korean: 허윤진, a.k.a. Jennifer Huh), South Korean-American singer-songwriter, dancer, producer and K-pop idol, member of K-pop girlgroup LE SSERAFIM

== See also ==
- Dong of Gangnam District
