= Gangnam =

Region in Seoul, South Korea

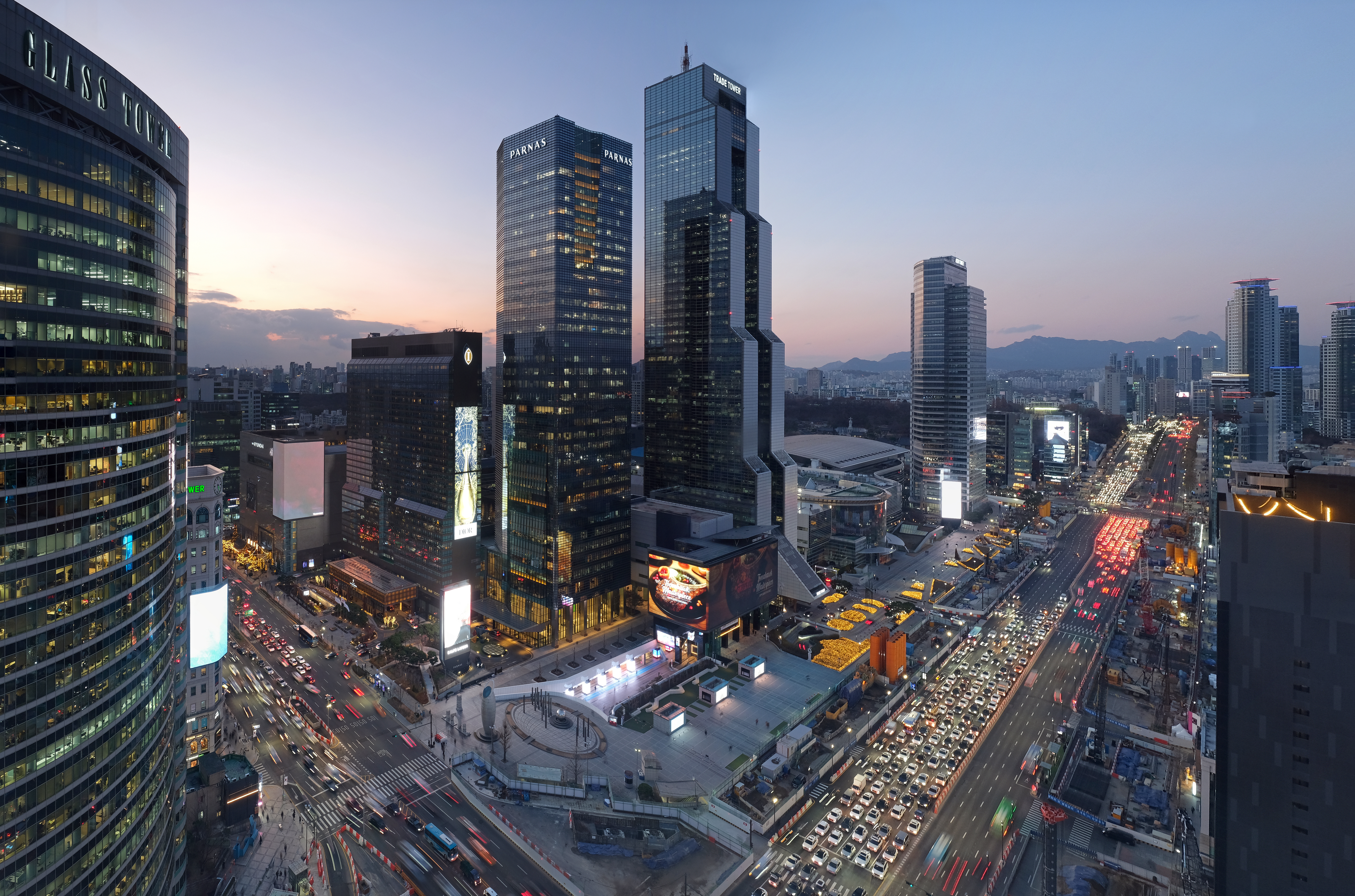
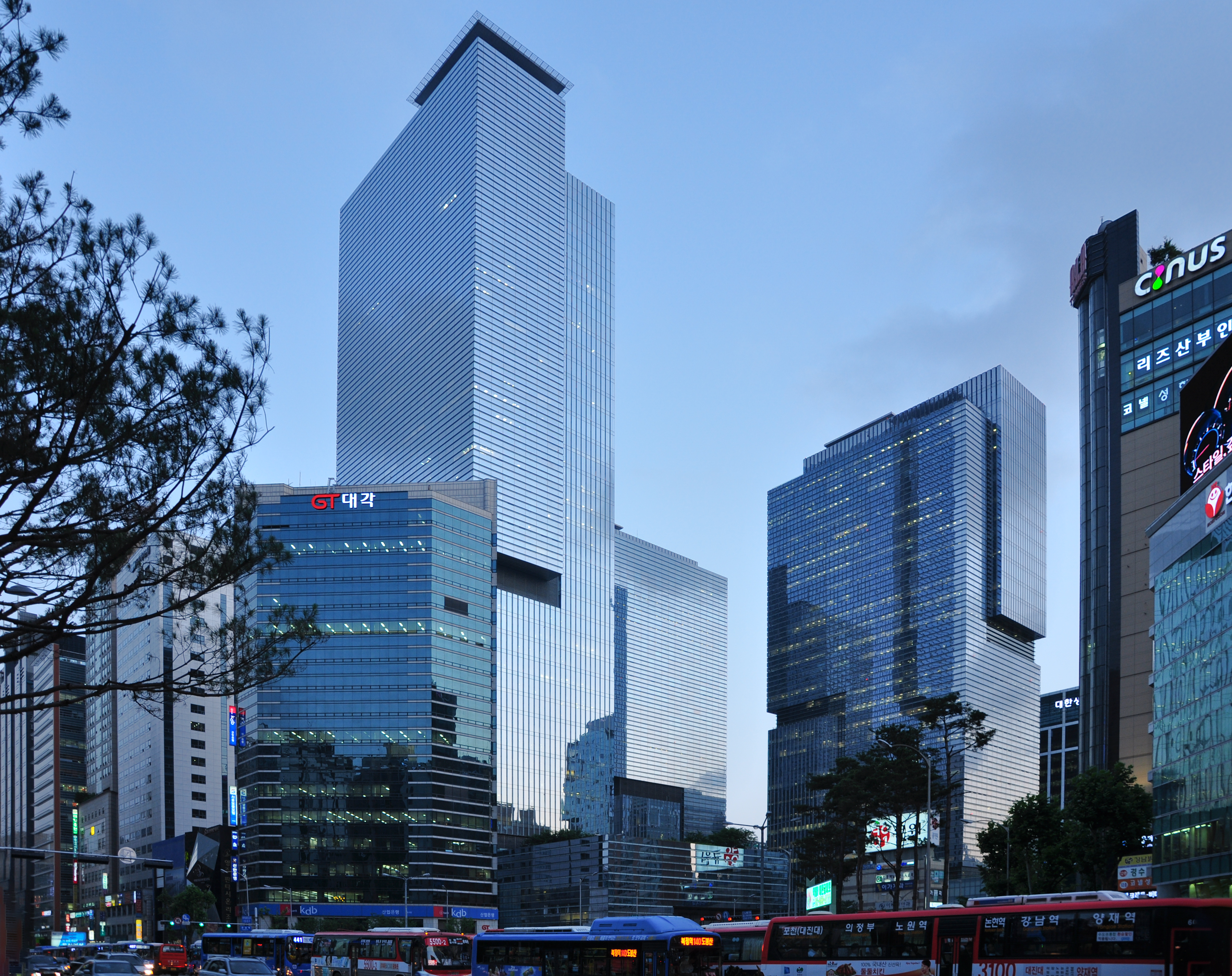
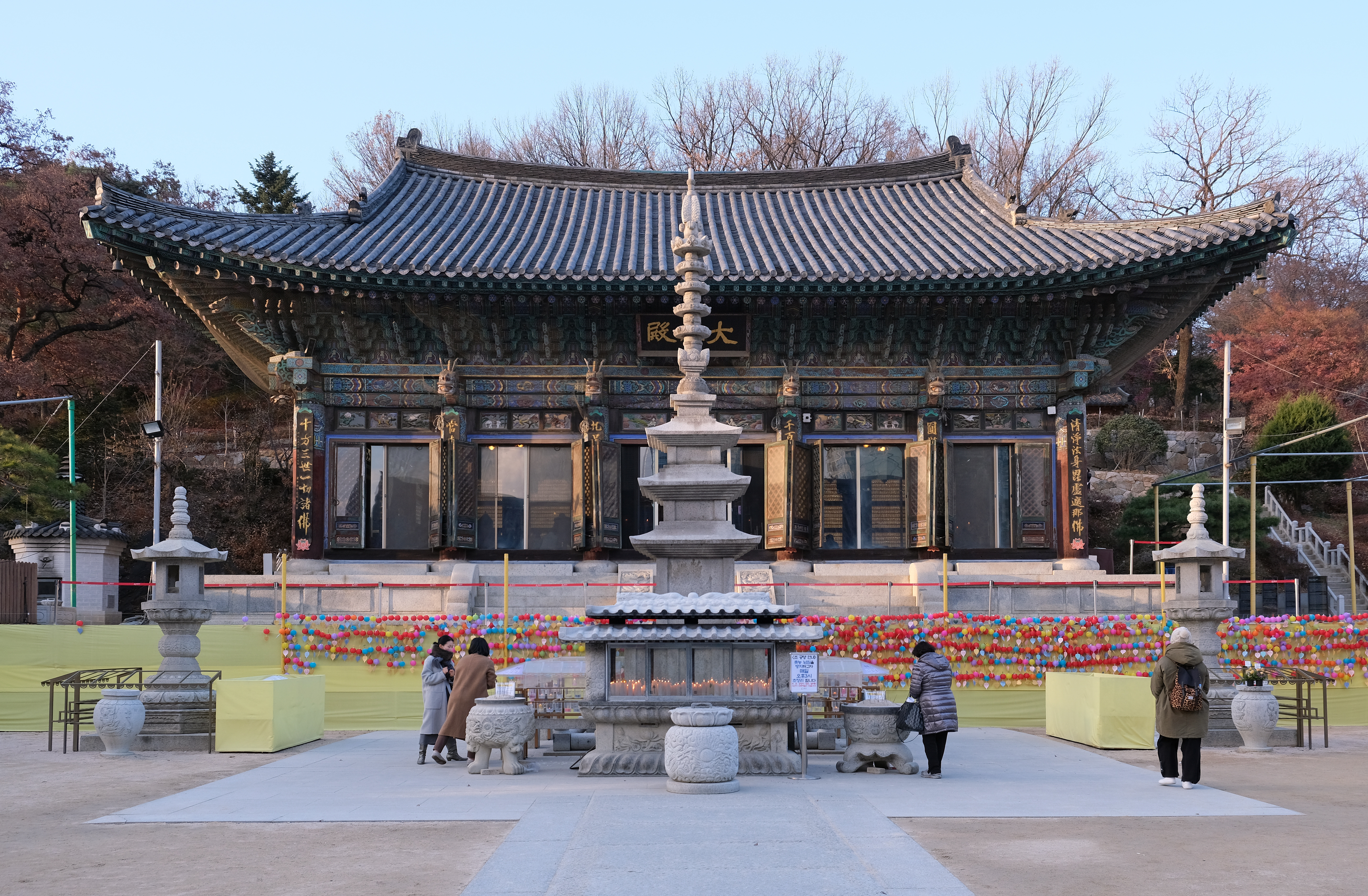
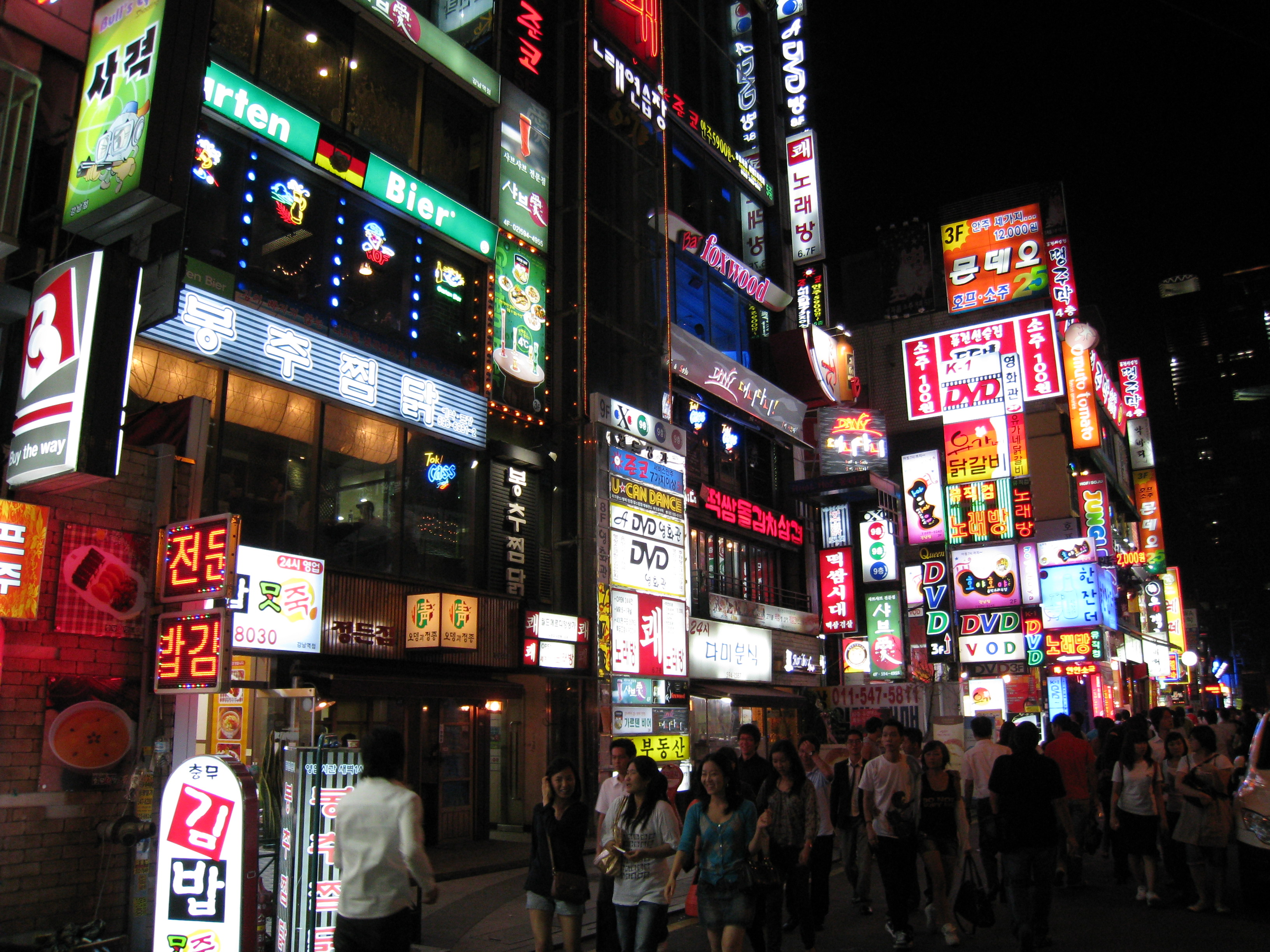
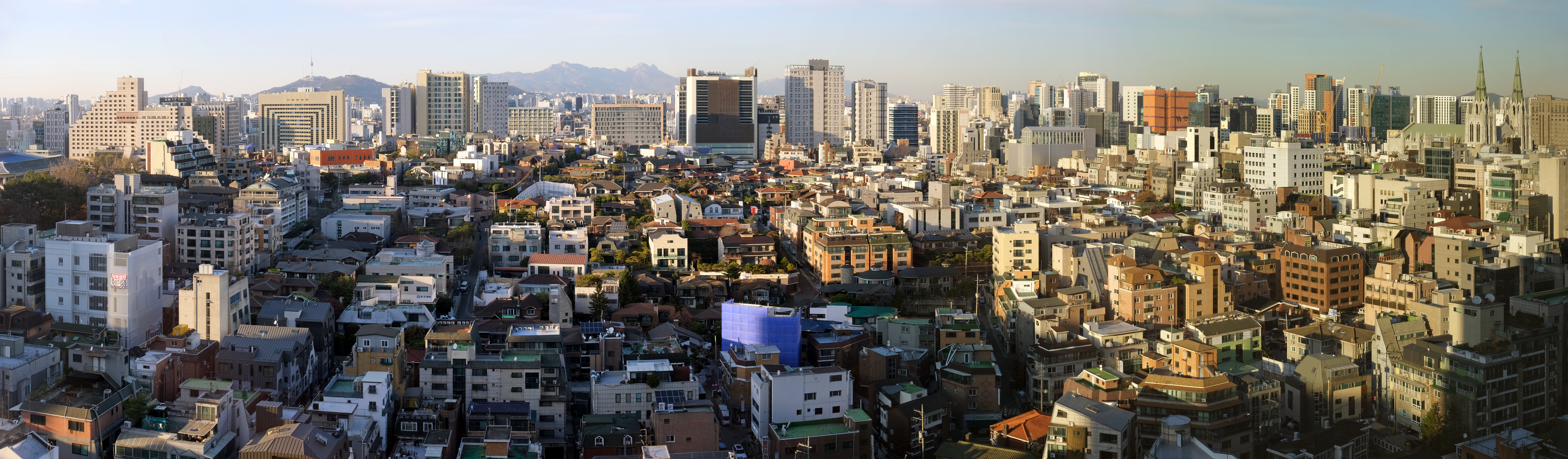
- Left to right from top: Intersection in Teheran Valley, Samsung Town, Bongeunsa temple, Lotte World Tower, Gangnam nightlife, Gangnam skyline

- Districts in dark red are traditionally considered part of Gangnam, while districts in pink are sometimes considered part of Gangnam
- Country: South Korea
- Metropolitan Area: Seoul Capital Area
- City: Seoul
- Composition: Core: Gangnam District; Seocho District; Songpa District; Periphery: Dongjak District; Gangseo District; Yeongdeungpo District; Gangdong District

Area
  - Total: 307.34 km^{2} (118.66 sq mi)
  - Core: 120.26 km^{2} (46.43 sq mi)

Population (2020)
  - Total: 4,985,421
  - Core: 1,553,172

Korean name
- Hangul: 강남
- Hanja: 江南
- RR: Gangnam
- MR: Kangnam

Gangnam (Korean: 강남; Hanja: 江南; pronounced [kaŋnam]; lit. 'South of the [Han] River'), sometimes referred to as the Greater Gangnam Area, is a geographic and cultural region in Seoul. While Gangnam can refer to the entire region of Seoul south of the Han River, the region is generally defined as consisting of the city's affluent Gangnam, Seocho and Songpa districts. (Note: Gangnam can refer to the entire region south of the Han River or the Gangnam District, but the term is most commonly used to refer to the three districts of Gangnam, Seocho, and Songpa.: Koo 2022, p. 67: "Although not every area of Gangnam is affluent, its three core districts (Gangnamgu, Seochogu, and Songpagu) are definitely middle or upper middle class in terms of the residents' economic status."; Jin 2023: "The term Gangnam technically means south of the river, and refers to three districts in Seoul below the Han River: Gangnam, Seocho and Songpa."; Yang 2018a, p. 3408: "While Gangnam can be defined in different ways – from the narrowest, limited to just the administrative district of Gangnam-gu itself, to the broadest, which would encompass the whole area south of the Han River– I follow the conventional and common definition of Gangnam as an area composed of the three administrative units of Gangnam-gu, Seocho-gu, and Songpa-gu.") Other definitions define Gangnam by the boundaries of the Gangnam Eighth School District or by the commercial zones around Gangnam Highway, Yangjae Station, Sinsa Station, Nonhyeon Station, Sinnonhyeon Station and Gangnam station. These definitions exclude the Songpa District, which has been argued to be culturally and administratively distinct from the Gangnam and Seocho districts.

Historically, the region was also called Yeongdong (영동; 永東; lit. 'East of Yeongdeungpo') and remained undeveloped prior to the state-led urban development of the 1960s. During the 1970s and 1980s, Park Chung Hee, aiming to counteract urban sprawl and the threat of North Korean invasion, promoted development in Gangnam through targeted investment into the region and the suppression of development north of the Han River. As a result of Park's policies, a number of companies, prestigious schools, and government institutions relocated to the region and land prices in Gangnam skyrocketed.

== Geography ==
While the term Gangnam can refer narrowly to the Gangnam District or broadly to the entire region of Seoul south of the Han River, the conventional and most common use of the term is to refer to the affluent Gangnam, Seocho, and Songpa districts. Other definitions exclude the Songpa District or define the region around the Gangnam Eighth School District or the commercial districts around Gangnam Highway and Gangnam station. The term Gangnam is used in counterpoint with Gangbuk (강북; 江北; lit. 'North of the [Han] River') and the distinction between the two regions was formed sometime following the 1970s. The region is surrounded by the Han River to the north, Umyeonsan Mountain, Guryongsan Mountain, and Daemosan Mountain to the south, the Tancheon stream to the southeast, and the Yangjaecheon stream to the southwest.

Gangnam is sometimes divided into Tebuk (테북; lit. 'north of Tehran') and Tenam (테남; lit. 'south of Tehran'), referring to the regions north and south of Teheran Boulevard respectively. In popular culture, residents from the northern half are characterized as old money and the families of chaebol, while residents from the southern half are characterized as working professionals who are overly concerned with their children's education as a result of their background.

The Cheongdam, Apgujeong, Dogok, and Seocho neighborhoods have the highest concentration of residential buildings in Gangnam, while the region's businesses are concentrated around Teheran Boulevard. The vast majority of land in Gangnam is zoned for residential use, and as of 2011, forty percent of all buildings are multi-family buildings. Guryong Village, a shantytown populated by residents displaced during the development of Gangnam, is found in the Gaepo neighborhood of Gangnam. The region's parks include Dosan Park, the Seonjeongneung burial ground, and the Yangjae Citizen's Forest.

== History ==
=== Joseon and Colonial Korea ===
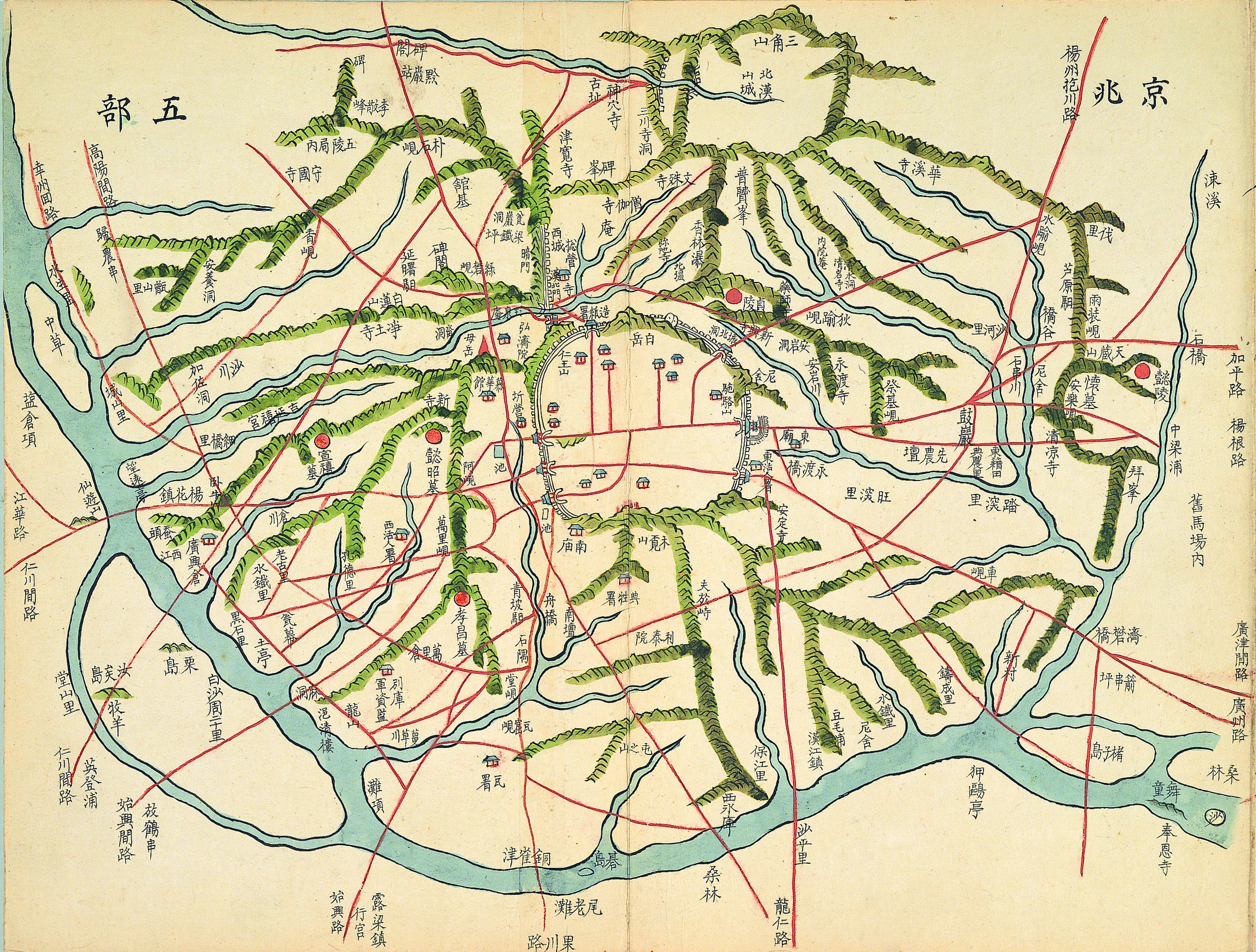
Map of Seoul in 1861. This map shows that only the area north of the Han River was included in Seoul during the Joseon dynasty.

Historically, before incorporating Gangnam region into the city of Seoul in 1963, the Gangnam region around current Gangnam District was never a part of Seoul. During 600 years of Joseon, the Seoul city was named as Hanseongbu (Korean: 한성부) constituted of two areas; An area inside the Fortress Wall and another area 10 Ris (Korean mile) outside of it. The latter area, named as Seongjeosimni, was strictly confined to area north of the Hangang river, as its southernmost point was recorded as Noryang (Korean: 노량), which was a harbor region north of the river in the era of early Joseon.

The swampy region was originally home to various poor farming households living in traditional thatched roof Korean homes, with most land being used for paddy fields and other low-value agriculture. In addition, the region's lowland geography made it vulnerable to flooding, excluding Gangnam from prior development plans. Being geographically adjacent to Seoul and the Han River, the region was an important point of land and sea transportation during the Joseon dynasty and the Japanese annexation of Korea. Until the construction of the Hannam Bridge, the region's only connections to Seoul were the Hangang Bridge and Yanghwa Bridge. (Note: While the Gwangjin Bridge, connecting the modern-day Gwangjin District and Gangdong District, was completed in 1936, at the time, the bridge was located outside of the boundaries of Seoul.) The region's isolation from central Seoul and its lack of public utilities, including an adequate sewage system, made it unappealing for most residents of Seoul.

Even when the Seoul city's peripheral suburb Seongjeosimni made huge growth in late period of Joseon, its southernmost point was still Noryang, and this Noryang region only expanded to small area south of the Hangang river just around the traditional harbor region. This tendency was continued to Colonial Korea, as the Japanese colonial government never included areas around current Gangnam District into boundary of Keijō. Keijō in its initial years, it was only constituted of current areas around of Downtown Seoul and Yongsan. Also when it was expanded to greater Keijō in 1936, its southernmost part was limited to Yeongdeungpo, which had industrial importance at that time.

=== State-led development ===
Military dictator Park Chung Hee and Seoul mayor Kim Hyun-ok favored development south of the river to counteract housing shortages and urban sprawl north of the river. By the late 1960s, migration from the countryside into Seoul had overwhelmed the city's existing infrastructure and various proposals were made to expand the city to the south. Following the 1968 assassination attempt on Park by North Korean soldiers, he announced plans to build a "second Seoul" south of the river to disperse the population away from the Korean Demilitarized Zone. At the time, Gangnam was distanced from the traditional central business districts of Jongro to the north and Yeouido to the west, and Seoul mayor Koo Cha Chun proposed that Gangnam would serve as the third nucleus of the city. The development of Gangnam began in earnest following the establishment of flood control measures, the opening of the Hannam Bridge in 1969, and the completion of the Gyeongbu Expressway in 1970, which connected Seoul to Busan.

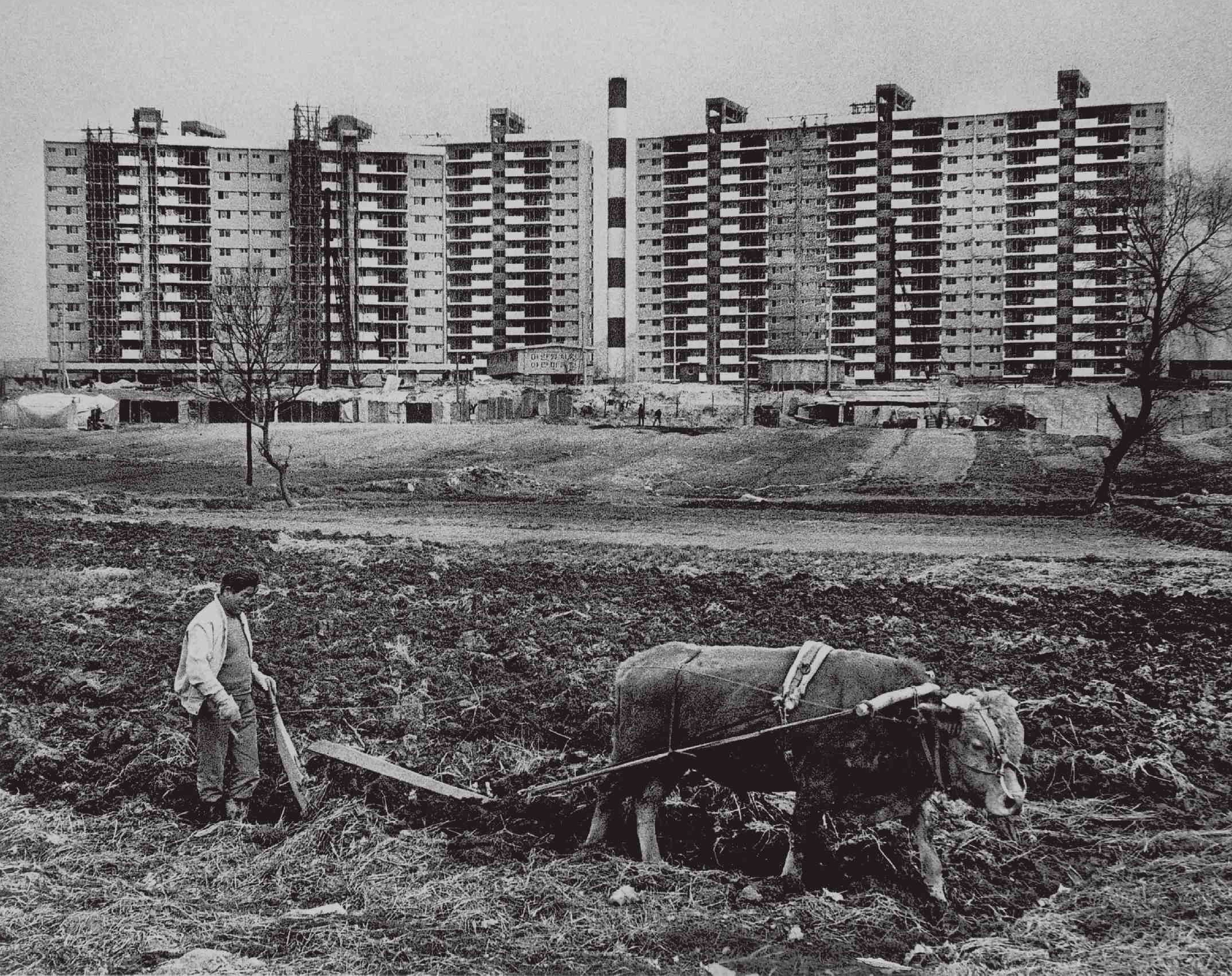
Farmer plows his field in front of a row of apartments in Apgujeong-dong, Gangnam District (1978)

Throughout the 1970s, the government implemented various economic incentives and tax exemptions to promote the construction of new apartments in Gangnam. By 1985, 70 percent of all housing units in Gangnam were apartments, compared to just 26.5 percent in the rest of Seoul. New residential constructions in Gangnam were sold off by the government at below market rates through a lottery program. These lotteries were highly competitive and were restricted to middle-class Koreans as a result of their strict financial requirements. During this time, intense media attention was focused on middle-class housewives who participated in the real estate market with the use of the pejorative term bok-buin (복부인; lit. 'Mrs. Realtor'). Competition for the lottery was intensified by the fact that lottery entrants typically entered the names of other family members, and because winners could resell their tickets at full market value, resulting in high levels of speculative investment. By 1985, 89 percent of Gangnam's residents had moved in within the last five years, in comparison with 30 percent for the rest of Seoul.

Between 1963 and 1979, land prices in Gangnam increased nearly 1000 times, while land prices in Gangbuk increased 25 times in the same period. In the early 1980s, the Park government enacted the Gangbuk Suppression Policies, which restricted the new construction of businesses, entertainment venues, factories, and department stores north of the river.

=== Relocation of schools ===
Before the 1970s, most prestigious schools in Seoul were located in Downtown Seoul. As part of the development program in Gangnam, the government provided construction and land subsidies, as well as tax exemptions, to schools that moved south of the river, hoping to attract parents to move for their children's educations. Additionally, the Park government passed the High School Equalization Policy, which ended rankings and entrance exams for elite high schools, encouraging these schools to move to Gangnam to regain their reputations. In 1975, Seoul National University relocated from Downtown Seoul to Gangnam and in 1976, Kyunggi High School, the highest ranked high school in Seoul, moved as well. In the following years, a number of elite high schools would move to Gangnam, giving the region its reputation as an educational mecca. The migration of these schools south of the river has been described as the primary reason behind Gangnam's current affluent status.

=== Post-Park development ===
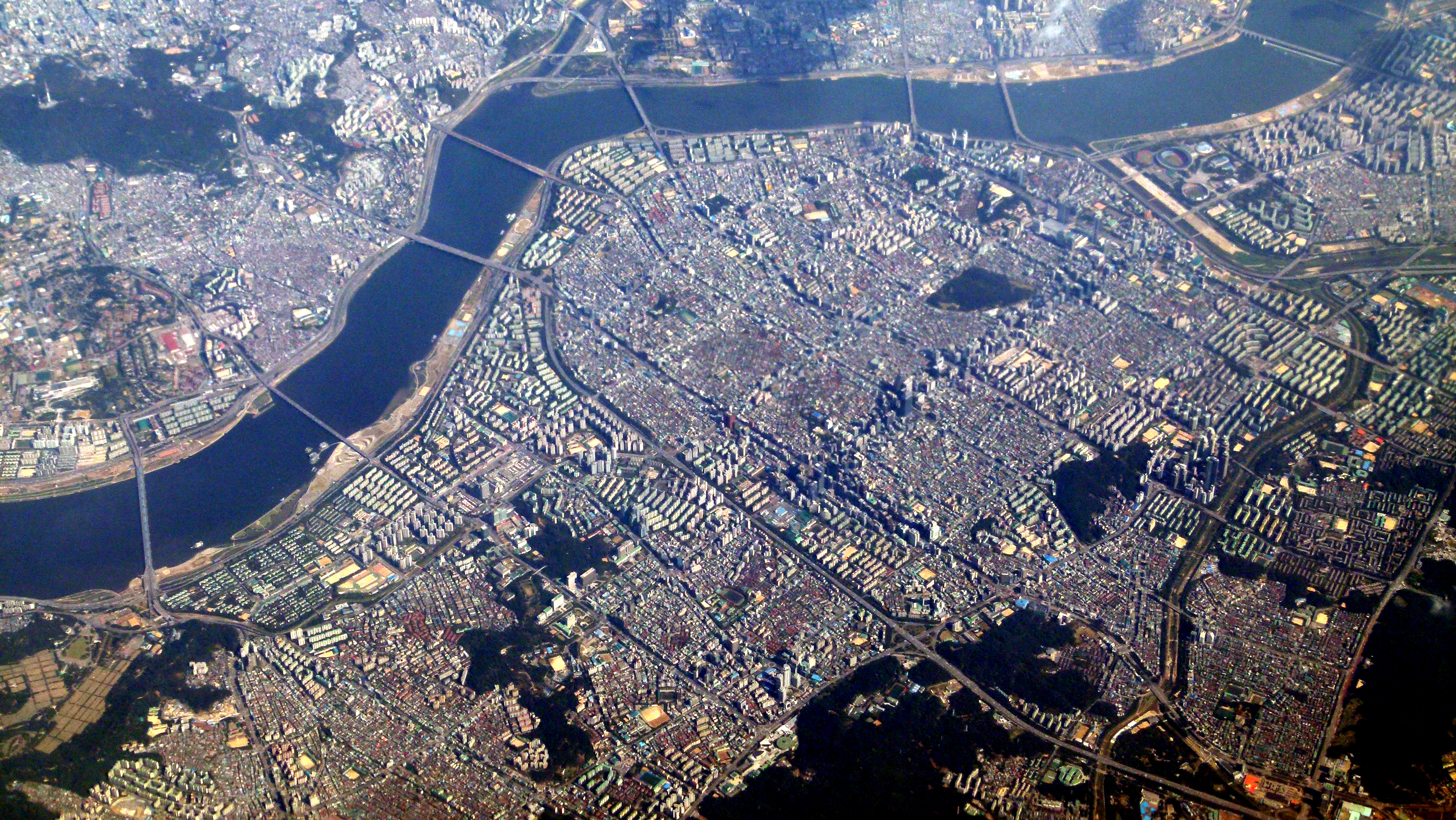
Gangnam in 2011

In 1988, in response to the rapid population growth in Gangnam, the region was split into the Seocho District and the Gangnam District. By 1992, more than half of Seoul's population lived south of the river, compared to just 20 percent before 1970. In 1995, the Supreme Court of Korea, the Supreme Prosecutor's Office, and the National Intelligence Service moved to Gangnam from their previous locations north of the river. There had previously been plans to move the Seoul City Hall, the Korea Customs Service, the Korea Forest Service, the Public Procurement Service, and eight financial institutions, including the Bank of Korea, the Korea Development Bank, and the Korea Exchange Bank, to Gangnam, but this plan received considerable pushback from the central government.

== Economy ==
Gangnam has among the highest concentrations of wealth in Seoul, with the Gangnam and Seocho districts having the greatest proportion of high-income households in the city. More than half of all lawyers, doctors, entrepreneurs, financial managers, and civil servants in South Korea live in Gangnam, and as of 2002, 37 percent of the National Assembly and 39 percent of all top officials lived in Gangnam. Following the relocation of the Supreme Court of Korea, the Seoul District Court, the Supreme Prosecutors' Office, and the Seoul Prosecutor's Office to the Seocho neighborhood of Seocho District, the area also has a high concentration of law offices. As of 2021, more than 82,000 people living in Gangnam had a net worth greater than 1 billion won.

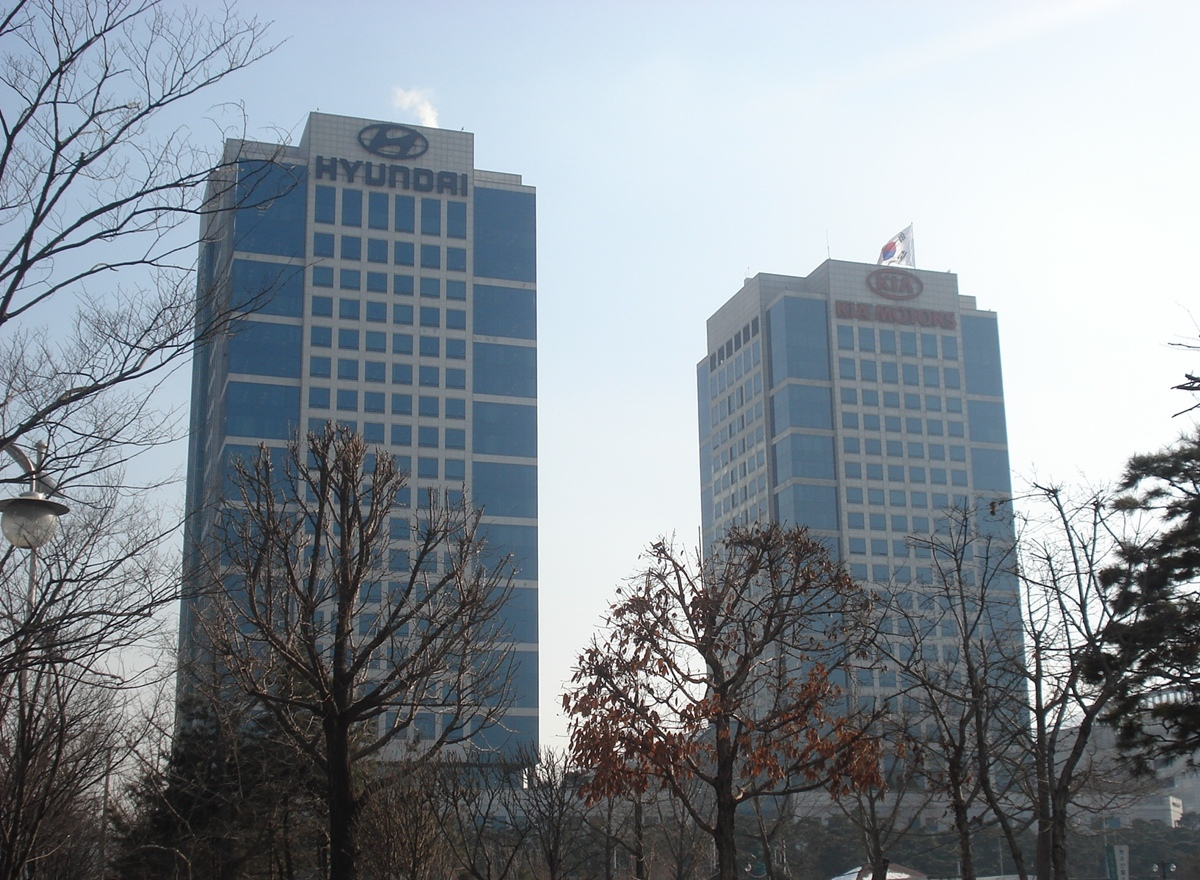
The headquarters of Hyundai Motor Group and its subsidiary Kia in the Seocho District of Gangnam

Gangnam hosts many startup companies and some of the largest South Korean technology companies, particularly in Teheran Valley, which developed rapidly following the completion of Seoul Subway Line 2 and the 1988 Summer Olympics. The area around Teheran Boulevard has the highest concentration of technology companies within Seoul, and the South Korean operations of Apple, Google, Oracle and Qualcomm began in Gangnam. A number of chaebols are headquartered in Gangnam, including Hyundai Motor Group, Samsung, GS Group, and the Lotte Corporation. In addition, the LG Corporation and KB Financial Group are headquartered in the Yeongdeungpo District, on the western part of the region south of the Han River. In 2010, the Gangnam, Seocho, and Songpa districts accounted for ten percent of the total land value of South Korea.

== Arts and culture ==
In Korean popular culture, Gangnam is depicted as both an object of aspiration and a region that draws reproval for the perceived corrupt and immoral ways in which its residents acquire their wealth. The boundaries of Gangnam are often defined by its affluence, and residents of Gangnam have been found to only recognize parts of Seoul with a standard of living similar or higher than their own to be part of Gangnam. The region has been likened to a gated community, with residents chastising other parts of Seoul as being 'old-fashioned' and 'unsophisticated'. Similarly, studies of children from Gangnam have found that they hold negative views of non-Gangnam areas, describing them as "rough, dirty, countrified, smelly, and somewhat dangerous". Residency in Gangnam is considered a status symbol, with both businesses and people actively seeking out the region as a means of exhibiting one's success. Although negative attitudes towards Gangnam residents are common among non-Gangnam residents, surveys have found most would still move to Gangnam if they were able to. The region has a high concentration of luxury brands, with the highest concentration in the Cheongdam neighborhood. The flagship stores of the Shinsagae, Hyundai, and Lotte department stores can all be found in Gangnam. Dosan-daero is known as the "Imported Car Highway" (수입차 하이웨이) for its concentration of foreign car dealerships, and Garosu Street in the Sinsa neighborhood is known for its concentration of fashion studios and cafes. More than 470 plastic surgery clinics are registered in Gangnam District, making up more than 30 percent of all clinics in the country. As a consequence of the Gangbuk Suppression Policies, Gangnam also has a disproportionate number of restaurants, bars, and hotels, with the 1995 Seoul Statistical Yearbook finding that Gangnam District has the greatest number of restaurants, karaoke bars, and pubs out of any district of Seoul. World Trade Center Seoul, the Seoul Arts Center, and the National Library of Korea are all found in Gangnam.

=== Pop culture ===
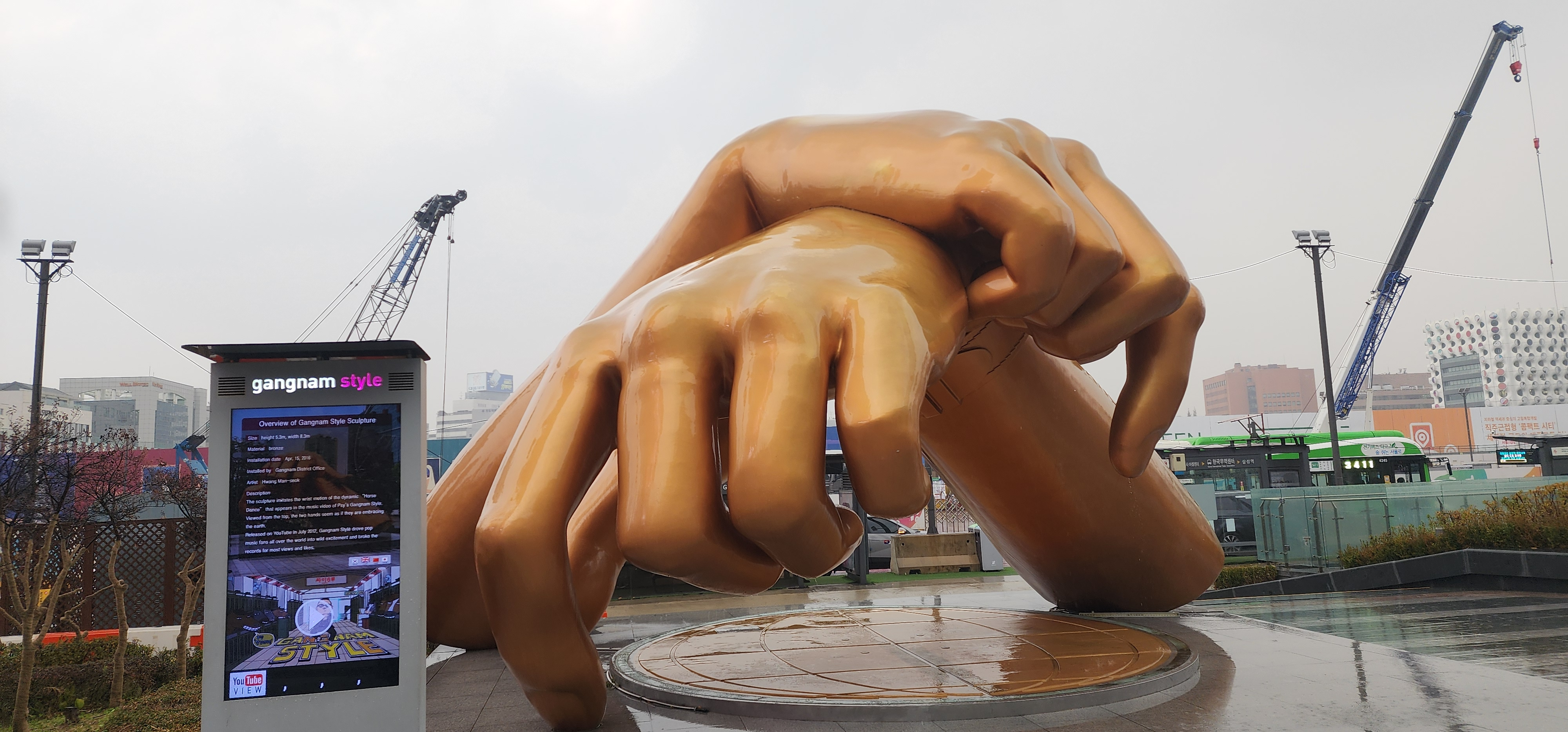
A 2016 bronze sculpture in Gangnam by Hwang Man-seok, inspired by the Psy video.

In the 2012 K-pop song "Gangnam Style", the singer PSY parodied the cultural, lifestyle, and class markers associated with the nouveau riche of the Gangnam region. While the music video features the ASEM Tower and Trade Tower in Gangnam, most of the video was filmed outside of Seoul in Incheon. The 2015 action film Gangnam Blues featured the history of real estate development in the Gangnam area. Gangnam has also been the setting of a number of K-dramas about the lives of affluent Koreans, including To Catch Up with Gangnam Mothers (2007), Living Among the Rich (2011), Cheongdam-dong Alice (2012), and Their Perfect Day (2013).

=== Religion ===
In Gangnam, attending an affluent or prestigious religious institution has become a status symbol. This phenomenon is especially prevalent among Protestant denominations that prohibit ancestor worship. The region is also known for having a number of megachurches—which is partially the result of the region's population boom.

== Housing and architecture ==
Gangnam is notable for having the first large-scale middle class apartment complexes built in Seoul. During the 2000s, a number of buildings designed by popular architects, including Daniel Libeskind, Mario Botta, and Ben van Berkel, were built in Gangnam. The Kyobo Gangnam Tower, Urban Hive, Boutique Monaco, and Samsung Town in Gangnam have all been recognized for their architecture.

== Education ==
Some of the most prestigious high schools and hagwons in South Korea are found in Gangnam. A number of elite middle and high schools moved to Gangnam following the redevelopment plans of the 1970s and 1980s, including Kyunggi High School in 1976; Whimoon Middle School and Whimoon High School in 1978; Sookmyung Girls' Middle School, Sookmyung Girls' High School, and Seoul High School in 1980; Joongdong Middle School and Joongdong High School in 1984; Dongduk Girls' Middle School and Dongduk Girls' High School in 1986; and Kyunggi Girls' High School in 1988. In 1977, following the High School Equalization Policy, Seoul was divided into nine school districts, with Gangnam being home to Eighth School District. As a result of the concentration of prestigious schools in Gangnam, competition to attend the district is intense.

Gangnam has a disproportionate number of hagwons for its population, having more than 32 percent of all hagwons in Seoul. In particular, the Daechi neighborhood of Gangnam has more than 900 hagwons, the highest number in the country. As a result of its location within the Gangnam Eighth School District and the end of the South Korean ban on private tutoring, Daechi-dong emerged as the epicenter of hagwons in Seoul. Of the students accepted into Seoul National University in 2022, 11.9 percent graduated from schools in the Gangnam and Seocho districts of Seoul. In addition, Gangnam has the highest proportion of residents with a bachelor's degree in Seoul, with the vast majority of residents having at least a bachelor's degree.

== Politics ==
District-level results for the 2012 Presidential election between Park Geun-hye (Liberty Korea Party; in red) and Moon Jae-in (Democratic United Party).

After the democratization of South Korea and the 1997 Asian financial crisis, Gangnam has gradually shifted towards the right, and the region is considered more politically conservative than the rest of Seoul. The region has historically voted for the right-wing Liberty Korea Party and its successor, the People Power Party. A disproportionate number of government officials appointed under the Lee Myung-bak and Yoon Suk Yeol administrations have been from Gangnam. The region has the highest voter turnout in Seoul. Voters in Gangnam are intensely concerned with protecting and increasing property values, a result of the density of high-value properties in the area.

Liberals who reside in Gangnam are often pejoratively called "Gangnam leftists" (강남 좌파; 江南左派) for outwardly progressive political positions that contrast with their class interests as residents of Gangnam. While the term is generally used to describe South Korean liberal politicians, like former Justice Minister Cho Kuk who was convicted of corruption, its use has expanded to describe politicians outside of Korea, being used to describe both Joe Biden and Emmanuel Macron.

== Transportation ==
The construction of the Hannam Bridge, the third bridge over the Han River in Seoul, began in January 1966 and was completed on December 25, 1966. The Gyeongbu Expressway, which connected Seoul to Busan through Gangnam, began construction in 1968, and the project was completed on July 7, 1970. These two projects were responsible for kick-starting a period of rapid growth in Gangnam. The Gyeongbu Expressway, along with the Gangnam Highway and Teheran Boulevard, comprise the main arterial roads of Gangnam.

In June 1975, the Seoul Metropolitan Government announced its plans to construct the Gangnam Express Bus Terminal, a dedicated bus terminal for Seoul to relieve traffic congestion caused by buses in the city center. Construction for the project was completed on October 20, 1981, and to promote its use, the city forcibly closed the bus terminal in Gangbuk, opened the Jamsu Bridge in 1976, and excavated the Third Namsan Tunnel in May 1978.

Gangnam has the greatest number of connections on the Seoul Metropolitan Subway, a product of Park Chung Hee's targeted development in the region. Lines Two and Three of the Seoul Metropolitan Subway were intentionally designed to go through Gangnam, which previously had a dearth of public transportation. The stations between the Sports Complex station and the Seoul National University of Education station on Seoul Subway Line 2 opened in December 1982 and the loop itself was completed in December 1983.

== See also ==
- Economic inequality in South Korea
- Education in South Korea
- Fashion in South Korea
- Haeundae District – region that has been described as the Gangnam of Busan
- Suseong District
- Economy of Seoul
