= The Man with Three Coffins =

- Poster for The Man with Three Coffins (1987)
- Hangul: 나그네는 길에서도 쉬지 않는다
- RR: Nageuneneun gireseodo swiji anneunda
- MR: Nagŭnenŭn kiresŏdo shwiji annŭnda
- Directed by: Lee Jang-ho
- Written by: Lee Jang-ho
- Based on: Travelers Do Not Rest on the Road by Lee Je-ha
- Produced by: Lee Jang-ho
- Starring: Kim Myung-gon; Lee Bo-hee
- Cinematography: Park Seung-bae
- Edited by: Hyeon Dong-chun
- Music by: Lee Jong-gu
- Distributed by: Pan Films Co., Ltd.
- Release date: June 11, 1987 (South Korea)
- Running time: 117 minutes
- Country: South Korea
- Language: Korean

The Man with Three Coffins (Korean: 나그네는 길에서도 쉬지 않는다) is a 1987 South Korean film written, produced, and directed by Lee Jang-ho. Additional English titles are The Man with Three Coffins, A Wanderer Never Stops on the Road and A Traveler Does Not Rest Even on the Road.

This film is based on a novel titled Travelers Do Not Rest on the Road by Lee Je-ha.

== Plot ==
Three years after his wife's death, Sun-seok takes his wife's ashes out of his closet and travels to her hometown to spread her remains. On his journey, he encounters three different women that look exactly like his wife; the first is a nurse (Ms. Choi) while the second and third women are both prostitutes. During this journey, the scenery and the people that Sun-seok sees and meets along the way brings back his memories of his deceased wife.

Sun-seok arrives in a small town called Mulchi. At a local inn, he meets a group of hikers who invite him to join them in gambling and indulging time with some prostitutes. After the hikers leave the inn, the inn owner approaches Sun-seok for a favor. The inn owner introduces Sun-seok to an ill old man and his nurse. This old man wants to go back to his hometown, Wolsan, one last time before he dies, but due to his illness he lost his ability to talk and was unable to express his last wish to his son. Ms. Choi, the old man's personal nurse, helps him escape the son's house but they needed a man's help them get to his hometown up north from Mulchi. After the son discovers that his dad is missing, the son sends some men to find them and bring the father back to his home. The local inn owner tells Sun-seok that they are willing to pay him 100,000 won if he helps them with the final stretch of their journey. Sun-seok declines the offer.

Sun-seok looks for the group of hikers at their motel. There, a hiker introduces a prostitute that looks like Sun-seok's late wife to him. After sleeping with her, she suddenly gets a seizure and dies. One of the hikers informs Sun-seok of her death and tells him that he can leave quietly and not get caught up with police affairs. He takes the hiker's offer and leaves quietly. Sun-seok returns to the local inn and asks the inn owner if the nurse and old man still needs help, but he discovers that they already left in a taxicab.

Sun-seok eventually reaches the next town and stays at another local inn. The inn owner sends a prostitute over to him; this is the second prostitute that also looks like Sun-seok's late wife. After sleeping together, she also suddenly dies in the morning, leaving Sun-seok in disbelief. After collecting himself, he goes to the bus station. He wants to buy a ticket to Wontong to find to the nurse and old man but, because of the expecting snowstorm, buses were not running for the rest of the day. However, a taxicab offers to drive him there for a much higher price. Sun-seok agrees to pay the fare, and on his way, he runs into the two men that are looking for the old man and Ms. Choi.

Sun-seok decides to tag along with these two men in order to find Ms. Choi. They find them in a small inn later that day; the two men bring the old man back to his son's home and coerce Ms. Choi to sign a contract saying she would not expose the old man's wishes to return home to the press. After the men leave, Ms. Choi tells Sun-seok that if he had decided to help them sooner, then the events would have turned out differently.

Ms. Choi invites Sun-seok to have dinner with her at a local inn, and they chat about their hometown and their next destination. Their meeting seems fateful as Ms. Choi mentions "Auraji River", a river that Sun-seok's late wife had mention to him before. Ms. Choi also mentions how a fortune teller once told her that at the age of thirty she will meet a man with three coffins behind his back; this man is her husband from a previous life. After a heart-to-heart exchange about their lives, they end up sleeping together.

On the morning he decides to leave for Seoul, he takes the rest of his wife's ashes and sends it off with the winter wind. Ms. Choi walks with Sun-seok to the river with the boat that will take him back to Seoul. On their walk, Ms. Choi explains the old man's situation and his family situation to Sun-seok and tears up the old man's only photo with his family members that still live in his hometown. As they are approaching the pier, Sun-seok proposes to Ms. Choi by suggesting that they work towards buying a house together after she visits her hometown and then they reunite in Seoul.

As they approach the pier, they see shamans perform some sort of ritual. As Sun-seok sets off to Seoul, Ms. Choi suddenly joins the shaman ritual as she dances in the ritual. Sun-seok is in shock looking at the scene. When he looks at the mountainous horizon, he suddenly sees a large hand that appears. The hand comes closer and closer until only the palm of the hand can be seen. Sun-seok screams and the movie ends, cutting to the credits.

== Cast ==
- Lee Bo-hee... Sun-seok's deceased wife, Mrs. Choi (the nurse), prostitute #1, prostitute #2
- Kim Myung-gon... Sun-seok, the man with three coffins
- Ko Seol-bong... Hee-jang
- Chu Seok-yang... Sashimi shop owner
- Yu Sun
- Gwon Sun-cheol
- Kim Dae-hwan
- Lee Eun-young
- Kim Sun-ae
- Im Gwi-ryeon

== Themes ==
=== Korean War and displacement ===
One of the main themes of this film is displacement of families. After the Korean War, the Korean DMZ line redefined the physical geographical boundary lines of many homes and families. The division between North and South Korea made it impossible for families to return to their hometown and even keep in touch.

One example is Sun-seok's deceased wife. Sun-seok and his wife lived in South Korea, but her hometown is in the DMZ area that is restricted. As a result, he cannot actually get to her hometown to spread her ashes; he is only able to at most get as close as the DMZ line will allow him. DMZ line aside, Sun-seok still has an extremely difficult time getting as close as he legally can because no one he has crossed roads with in South Korea is very familiar with the landscape his late wife had once described to him.

Another example is the old man that Ms. Choi tries helping. In The Man with Three Coffins, Ms. Choi explains that the old man has repeatedly expressed his wishes to go back to his hometown to die. The son only considers South Korea to be their home because it is where he had many new-found opportunities and was even able to establish his own successful business and wealth for his family. As a result, the son ignores his father's wishes and continues to insist that South Korea is their only home. Despite Ms. Choi's help the mission was unsuccessful and the old man is brought back to the son's home by the son's men.

=== Korean shamanism ===
Korean shamanism in The Man with Three Coffins was shown through related imagery of shamanism as well as the discussion of ideas of fate and reincarnation. Some of the imagery and shamanism included cut scenes of bells and scenes of shaman rituals. An example of fate and reincarnation includes Ms. Choi's encounter with a shaman that told her that she was going to meeting a man with three coffins and he is her husband from a previous life.

== Critical response ==
The Man with Three Coffins artistically portrays the suffering and loss of the families from the north who have been uprooted by the Korean War through non-conventional story-telling; Lee Jang-ho experimental storytelling involved a mixture of the present timeline of Sun-seok's journey to spread his late wife's ashes, shamanistic rituals, encounters with women that look like his wife, and his own flashbacks of his late wife. The seemingly illogical division between shamanism and reality to capture one's strong desire return to one's hometown in North Korea suggests that the reality of the situation of division is deeply embedded in society and is what links people together. The film was also praised for the sepia tones over the film. In an interview, Lee Jang-ho said that the sepia tones were inspired by the colored glass that he and his friends used to hold over their eyes to see the world in different colors, old sepia-colored war newsreels, and the Claude Lelouch's Un homme et une femme (1966). The film was also highly praised for its pansori and shamanistic sounds that interweave and bleed into one another throughout the story.

== Film festivals and accolades ==
The Man with Three Coffins has been invited and screened at various film festivals around the world, including:

1. Busan International Film Festival: BIFF (2018) - Korean Cinema Retrospective
2. London Korean Film Festival (2016) - CLASSICS REVISITED: Lee Chang-ho Retrospective
3. Marrakech International Film Festival (2009) - Tribute to South Korean Cinema
4. Berlin International Film Festival (1988) - Forum

In addition to being invited and screened at film festivals, the production team and staff members were also nominated for awards for this film soon after its release.

Director Lee Jang-ho received the International Critics Association Award at the 2nd Tokyo International Film Festival (1987), and he also received a special prize in Film Division at the 24th Baeksang Arts Prize (1988).

In 1988, Park Seung Bae was nominated and won the Award for Photography at the 8th Korean Film Critics Association Award (Youngpyeong Award).

Although New Yorker Films purchased the rights for distribution in the US, the film was never released in theaters. If it would have been released, it would have been the first South Korean film released in the United States.
