= Oh Ji-eun =

South Korean actress (born 1981)

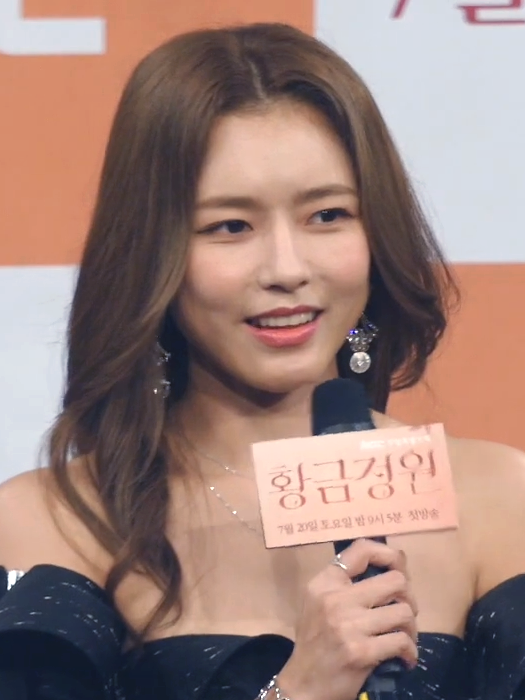
- Oh in The Golden Garden press conference (2019)
- Born: December 30, 1981 (age 44); Seoul, South Korea
- Education: Hanyang University - Theater and Film
- Occupation: Actress
- Years active: 2003–present
- Agent: Mystic Actors

Korean name
- Hangul: 오지은
- Hanja: 吳知恩
- RR: O Jieun
- MR: O Chiŭn

Oh Ji-eun (Korean: 오지은; born December 30, 1981) is a South Korean actress. She is best known for her roles in the weekend drama Three Brothers, the daily drama Smile Again, the sitcom Living Among the Rich, the entertainment industry satire The King of Dramas, and the supernatural police procedural Cheo Yong. On 22 October 2017, she married a Korean American, whom she dated for over two years.

== Filmography ==
=== Film ===
Year	Title	Hangul	Role	Notes
2003	Actor Oh Mi-soon	연극인 오미순		Short film
2003	Dream	꿈		Short film
2003	Hojeopmong	호접몽		Short film
2004	GET&LOST			Short film
2005	August	8월		Short film
2005	Travel	여행		Short film
2005	Whistle	호루라기		Short film
2007	The Worst Guy Ever	내 생애 최악의 남자	advertising company copywriter	Supporting role
2007	Twins	쌍둥이들	Na-young	Short film
2008	My Dear Enemy	멋진하루	Se-mi	Supporting role
2008	Go Go 70s	고고70	fighting prostitute	Bit part
2008	Truly, Madly, Deeply	진실한 병한씨	Mi-young	Short film
2009	Members of the Funeral	장례식의 멤버	young Jeong-hee	Supporting role
2009	Possessed	불신지옥	Jeong-mi	Supporting role
2009	House Family	하우스 패밀리	daughter	Short film
2010	Parallel Life	평행이론	Nam Ka-hee	Supporting role

=== Television ===
Year	Title	Hangul	Role	Notes/Ref.
2006	Bad Family	불량 가족		Bit part
2007–2008	Lee San, Wind of the Palace	이산	Damo Yeo-jin	Supporting role
2009	Again, My Love	미워도 다시 한 번	Choi Yoon-hee	Supporting role
2009–2010	Three Brothers	수상한 삼형제	Ju Eo-young	Supporting role
2010–2011	Smile Again	웃어라 동해야	Lee Bong-yi	Lead role
2011–2012	Gwanggaeto, The Great Conqueror	광개토태왕	Do-young	Main cast
2011–2012	Living Among the Rich	청담동 살아요	Oh Ji-eun	Main cast
2012–2013	The King of Dramas	드라마의 제왕	Sung Min-ah	Main cast
2014	Cheo Yong	귀신보는 형사, 처용	Ha Sun-woo	Lead role
2014	Make Your Wish	소원을 말해봐	Han So-won	Lead role
2016	Blow Breeze	불어라 미풍아	Park Shin-ae/Kang Mi-jung	Lead antagonist Left the drama on October 4, 2016 due to ankle injury
2017	Unknown Woman	이름 없는 여자	Son Yeo-ri	Lead role
2019	The Golden Garden	황금정원	Sabina / Eun Dong-joo	Lead antagonist

=== Variety show ===
Year	Title	Notes
2011	Talent Sharing Project DREAM	
2013	Law of the Jungle	Himalayas episode

=== Music video appearances ===
Year	Artist	Title	Hangul	Notes
2007	Big Mama	"Betrayal"	배반	Co-starring Ha Jung-woo
2013	Davichi	"Because I Miss You More Today"	오늘따라 보고싶어서 그래	

== Awards and nominations ==
Year	Award	Category	Nominated work	Result
2007	Mise-en-scène Short Film Festival	Special Jury Award	Twins	Won
2007	Korea Youth Film Festival	Best Actress	Twins	Won
2009	KBS Drama Awards	Best New Actress	Three Brothers	Nominated
2010	KBS Drama Awards	Best New Actress	Three Brothers, Smile Again	Won
2011	KBS Drama Awards	Excellence Award, Actress in a Daily Drama	Smile Again	Nominated
2012	SBS Drama Awards	Excellence Award, Actress in a Miniseries	The King of Dramas	Nominated
2014	MBC Drama Awards	Excellence Award, Actress in a Serial Drama	Make Your Wish	Nominated
2019	MBC Drama Awards	Excellence Award, Actress in a Weekend/Daily Drama	The Golden Garden	Nominated
