= Lee Bo-hee =

South Korean actress (born 1959)

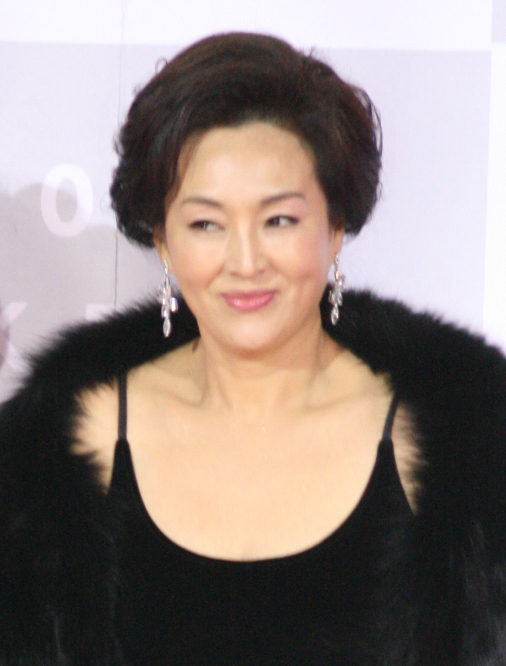
- Lee in 2010
- Born: 25 May 1959 (age 67); Wando County, South Jeolla Province, South Korea
- Occupation: Actress
- Years active: 1983–present

Korean name
- Hangul: 이보희
- Hanja: 李甫姬
- RR: I Bohui
- MR: I Pohŭi

Lee Bo-hee (Korean: 이보희; born 25 May 1959) is a South Korean actress. Lee won a number of awards for her film roles in the 1980s, including Best New Actress for The Green Pine Tree at the 22nd Grand Bell Awards, Best Actress for Eoudong at the 22nd Korea Drama and Film Art Awards, and Best Actress for You My Rose Mellow at the 24th Baeksang Arts Awards and 8th Korean Association of Film Critics Awards.

Lee Bo-hee is referred to as one of "The Troika of the 1980s" along with Lee Mi-sook and Won Mi-kyung, all three of which dominated the screen of the period.

== Filmography ==
=== Film ===
Year	Title	Role
1983	The Green Pine Tree	
1984	Widow Dance	
1984	Declaration of Idiot	Hye-young
1984	Agada	
1984	Between the Knees	Ja-young
1984	The Light of Recollection	
1985	Eoudong	Uhwudong
1986	Lee Jang-ho's Baseball Team	Eomji
1987	Moonlight Hunter	
1987	The Man with Three Coffins	Mrs. Choe
1987	Y's Experience	
1988	You My Rose Mellow	Su-kyung
1988	Gam-dong	
1988	America, America	
1994	Rosy Days	
1994	The Man of 49 Days	
1998	A+ Life	
2010	Le Grand Chef 2: Kimchi Battle	Soo-hyang
2011	Sunny	

=== Television series ===
Year	Title	Role
1995	West Palace	Queen Inmok
1996	Tears of the Dragon	Concubine Seon, Taejong's fourth consort
1999	Lost One's Way	
2001	Ladies of the Palace	Dowager Queen Jasun
2001	Blue Mist	Oh Young-hee
2001	Why Women?	
2001	Piano	Lee Eun Shim
2002	Whenever the Heart Beats	Jang Gyo-soo
2002	Kitchen Maid	Kang-ok
2002	Jang Hui-bin	Lady Yoon
2003	Go Mom Go!	
2004	Terms of Endearment	Na Jin-deok
2004	My 19 Year Old Sister-in-Law	Park Young-ran
2004	When a Man is in Love	Park Hwa-young
2005	Three Leafed Clover	Jo Yoon-sook
2005	My Sweetheart, My Darling	Jo Ok-soon
2005	Dear Heaven	Kim Mi-hyang
2006	Seoul 1945	Ame Kaori
2006	Which Star Are You From	Ahn Jin-hee
2007	When Spring Comes	Kim Boo-seon
2007	Lucifer	Soon-ok
2007	Queen of Ahyun	Sa Bi-na
2007	Innocent Woman	Chun Deok-hee
2008	My Lady	Ha Shin-ae
2009	The Road Home	Oh Seon-yeong
2009	Three Brothers	Gye Sol-yi
2010	A Man Called God	Han Soo-ra
2010	KBS Drama Special: "Reason"	Kim Ji-soo
2010	Flames of Desire	Cha Soon-ja
2010	Smile, Dong-hae	Gye Sun-ok
2011	Gwanggaeto, The Great Conqueror	Go Ya
2011	KBS Drama Special: "The Woman from the Olle Road"	Lady Oh
2011	Just You	Lee Sun-young
2011	Living Among the Rich	Kim Bo-hee
2012	My Lover, Madame Butterfly	Bae Shin-ja
2012	Wild Romance	Yang Sun-hee
2013	Iris II: New Generation	Jung Soo-min/Jung Ji-young
2013	Wang's Family	Park Sal-ra
2014	Everybody Say Kimchi	Ji Sun-young
2014	Marriage, Not Dating	Hoon-dong's mother
2014	Apgujeong Midnight Sun	Seo Eun-ha
2015	The Great Wives	Hong Geum-sook
2015	Tomorrow Victory	Ji Young-sun
2016–2017	Our Gap-soon	Nam Gi-ja
2017–2018	Enemies from the Past	Woo Yang-sook
2019	Liver or Die	No Yang-sim
2020–present	Catch! Teenieping	Chachaping, Lena
2021	Revolutionary Sisters	Oh Bong-ja
