= Cinderella (2006 film) =

- South Korean theatrical release poster
- Hangul: 신데렐라
- RR: Sinderella
- MR: Sinderella
- Directed by: Bong Man-dae
- Written by: Son Kwang-soo
- Produced by: Park Min-hee; Kim Jae-young
- Starring: Shin Se-kyung; Do Ji-won; Jeon So-min; Yoo Da-in; Jo Sung-ha
- Cinematography: Kim Hyun-tae
- Edited by: Moon In-dae
- Music by: Hyun Jin-yung
- Production companies: Mini Film Productions; K&Entertainment
- Distributed by: Showbox
- Release date: August 17, 2006
- Running time: 94 minutes
- Country: South Korea
- Language: Korean
- Box office: US$3,130,383

Cinderella (Korean: 신데렐라) is a 2006 South Korean supernatural horror film, loosely inspired by the fairy tale of Cinderella. It was directed by Bong Man-dae and starred Do Ji-won and Shin Se-kyung.

== Plot ==
A figure carries a birthday cake into a room but drops it in shock as another figure commits suicide by hanging herself.

Su-kyoung is on an operating table, ready to undergo plastic surgery. She is nervous and is comforted by her friend Hyeon-su, whose parents are divorced, though she shares a good relationship with her mother Yoon-hee, a successful and talented plastic surgeon. Su-kyoung, alone, sees a frightening image of a girl in a dark blue dress. Yoon-hee begins the surgery, telling her it is time to become pretty.

Later, Hyeon-su is in her art class, making a sculpture of Su-kyoung's face. The class says that Su-kyoung looks more attractive than she did before. Hyeon-su accidentally cuts into the face of her sculpture and a large cut subsequently appears on Su-kyoung's cheek. She screams and flees in terror. A mysterious voice shrieks at her saying she wants her face back. Su-kyoung's cut and blood later vanish. Hye-won, another friend, decides to get an eye job from Yoon-hee.

Hyeon-su, Jae-hui and Su-kyoung wait at a bus stop while an old woman hands out fliers for her missing granddaughter. The bus arrives but Hyeon-su waits for her friend Sung-eon to come. Jae-hui shows instant dislike for Sung-eon, who is tomboyish and hasn't undergone plastic surgery. The girls attend Hyeon-su's birthday party and Su-kyoung gives her an expensive doll as a present. The same ghost girl that Su-kyoung saw appears next to Hyeon-su. When Su-kyoung goes to the bathroom, she sees her face shredded in the reflection. She screams and runs from Hyeon-su's house.

Later, the girls look through a photo album and laugh about what they used to look like. Hyeon-su tells Sung-eon that she has no childhood pictures, which her mother overhears. Meanwhile, Su-kyoung has locked herself inside her room for days and refuses to see anyone. Her mother calls Yoon-hee and Hyeon-su to help. The ghost girl appears to Su-kyoung and says "I'll make you pretty" before Su-kyoung's face begins to violently cut open. The women find the dead Su-kyoung with her face cut off on one side.

Hyeon-su goes into the basement where she was told never to go as a child. She finds a picture of a child with a severely-burnt face and the caption "Hyeon-su before surgery" on it. The ghost girl watches her but vanishes when Hyeon-su's mother comes down and scolds her. Hyeon-su becomes distant and refuses to speak to her mother before leaving to see her father. Yoon-hee follows.

As Hyeon-su talks to her father, Yoon-hee has a flashback from many years before. She had told Hyeon-su to wait in the car while she delivered a file to her husband. The car's engine began to smoke. Yoon-hee found her husband engaging in oral sex with another woman, hits him, and leaves. The engine exploded, horribly burning Hyeon-su and leaving her comatose. Yoon-hee wept over her disfigured daughter. She later visited a church, where a little orphaned girl grew attached to her, addressing her as mommy. The Orphaned Girl loved Yoon-hee and the two are shown to have a loving relationship. Yoon-hee's husband found Hyeon-su missing.

Back in present day, Yoon-hee confronts her ex-husband and tells him that he has no right to see Hyeon-su. Her ex-husband argues saying that the girl isn't Hyeon-su; it is the Orphaned Girl. As Yoon-hee leaves, Hyeon-su tearfully says "Mom" and hugs her. Yoon-hee takes her home. The doorbell rings and Yoon-hee is horrified to find it is Hyeon-su. The two get into an argument in which Hyeon-su tells her that she isn't her real mother and locks herself in her room. Yoon-hee notices the bath is overflowing. Hyeon-su has another terrifying encounter with the ghost girl, who is soaking wet.

The next day Hyeon-su shows the picture of the missing girl from the old woman to Sung-eon and then shows her a photo given to her by her father. Sung-eon notices that they look similar but have different eye colors. Meanwhile, Jae-hui and Hye-won appear to become possessed in art class, cutting each other's faces with scalpels, uttering "I'll make you pretty." Paramedics take their bodies away. Yoon-hee locks the real Hyeon-su in the basement when she returns home. She then puts who she believes to be Hyeon-su to bed.

In another flashback, it is shown that the real Hyeon-su, still with her face burned off, begins to show signs of improvement and Yoon-hee performs an operation. She removes the girl's oxygen mask but cannot bring herself to kill her and sobs for her "daughter"; the faceless girl lovingly strokes her hand. Later, the faceless girl watches the other girl play with a friend and comments on how pretty she is. Yoon-hee tells her that she is prettier but the Faceless Girl accuses her of liking the other girl better. Yoon-hee lovingly tells the Faceless Girl that she will make her a new face. Unfortunately Yoon-hee didn't fully keep her promise; she only made the girl very realistic masks of her daughter's face. The Faceless Girl, now in her late teens, sneaks out of the basement and witnesses Hyeon-su's birthday party with all of the friends who would later have surgery. Yoon-hee hastily locks her back in but the Faceless Girl screams, begging for a birthday party and a pretty face as Yoon-hee breaks into tears on the other side of the door. Later, Yoon-hee prepares a cake and takes it to her, finding out that she has hung herself (the first scene in the film).

Hyeon-su discovers the girl's room and finds a cupboard filled with the masks she wore over the years and a diary filled with sadness and hate towards Hyeon-su and her friends. Hyeon-su then discovers a fridge-like device which Yoon-hee kept the Faceless Girl's body in after her death. Sung-eon and Hyeon-su search for Yoon-hee. Sung-eon sees who she believes to be Hyeon-su but it is actually the Faceless Girl who pulls her own face off like a mask. Hyeon-su finds Sung-eon, who has fainted from shock; her mother then appears and drugs her.

Hyeon-su lies on an operating table next to the corpse of the Faceless Girl, who is wearing a mask that resembles Hyeon-su's face. Yoon-hee removes the mask, revealing the Faceless Girl's gruesome visage for the first time. Yoon-hee tells a panicking Hyeon-su that it is time to give her face back and begins to operate but stops when she remembers how much she loved her. Yoon-hee collapses to the floor in grief but the corpse of Faceless Girl gets up and tries to cut off Hyeon-su's face, screaming "I want my face back!". Yoon-hee stops her, telling her that she is her daughter and that she is sorry for all she did to her. The ghastly corpse reverts into the child she once was. The Faceless Girl was The Orphaned Girl all along, not the real Hyeon-su, and the operation had been a face swap. Yoon-hee had cut off the Orphaned Girl's face and had given it to Hyeon-su. Yoon-hee repents for her sins and leaves with the Orphaned Girl to go onto the Afterlife. However, the final scene shows the Orphaned Girl, back in her faceless form appearing by Hyeon-su's bed, still wanting her face back.

== Cast ==
- Do Ji-won as Yoon-hee
- Shin Se-kyung as Hyeon-su
- Ahn Gyu-ryun as Sung-eon
- Ahn Ah-young as Jae-hui
- Jeon So-min as Hye-won
- Yoo Da-in as Su-kyoung
- Jo Sung-ha as Hyeon-su's father
- Kim Do-yeon as friend
- Kim Ji-na as young Hyeon-su
- Lee Won as swimming pool waiter

== Themes ==
The title "Cinderella" is directed towards the orphaned girl, the black haired ghost in the story. She can be dubbed Cinderella because she was illegally adopted after the original Hyeon-su suffered near-fatal burns and disfigurement from being in a car explosion. The orphan loved her "mother" very much but after the original Hyeon-su began to recover, their mother did an operation to have the orphaned girl's face removed and attached to her biological daughter. Hyeon-su, having no memory of the incident, was spoiled by her mother while the faceless orphaned girl was kept in the cellar.

Making connections back to the original Cinderella story, Cinderella was also treated badly by a stepmother and was locked away in her room while her two stepsisters and stepmother obtained all of her father's fortune.

The adopted daughter was never given any birthday parties, was never allowed to go to school, and was left inside the basement writing in her diary, hoping that one day her "mother" will make her a new face, as she promised but never did. As she grew older, she felt more betrayed after watching Hyeon-su, the real daughter, grow up, becoming beautiful with her face and having birthday parties with her beautiful friends and thus ended up committing suicide in the basement, writing about how much she hates Hyeon-su, her friends and how she wishes she could kill them all.

Unfortunately, the mother finally decides to throw the orphaned girl a party and brings her a cake, only to discover that she had hung herself. Feeling it be Hyeon-su's fault, she begins haunting her friends until they go crazy with thoughts of being ugly. With those thoughts, they commit suicide by cutting up their own faces, or inflicting facial disfigurement on each other. Also, the orphaned girl truly loved her mother and wanted nothing more than to be with her forever. In the end, Hyeon-su's mother agrees to go onto the afterlife with the adopted girl to save her real daughter and bring peace to the orphaned girl's torturous life.

In South Korea and other parts of Asia, there is an extreme preoccupation with beauty and achieving it through plastic surgery. This film seems to address that issue through horror and dark satirical themes and imagery.
