= Three Brothers (TV series) =

- Promotional poster
- Also known as: Suspicious Brothers; Strange Brothers
- Hangul: 수상한 삼형제
- Hanja: 殊常한 三兄弟
- RR: Susanghan samhyeongje
- MR: Susanghan samhyŏngje
- Genre: Drama; Romance; Family
- Written by: Moon Young-nam
- Directed by: Jin Hyung-wook
- Starring: Ahn Nae-sang; Oh Dae-gyu; Lee Joon-hyuk
- Country of origin: South Korea
- Original language: Korean
- No. of episodes: 70

Production
- Executive producer: Moon Bo-hyun (KBS)
- Production location: South Korea
- Running time: 60 minutes
- Production company: JS Pictures

Original release
- Network: KBS2
- Release: October 17, 2009 – June 13, 2010

Three Brothers (Korean: 수상한 삼형제; RR: Susanghan samhyeongje) is a 2009 South Korean television series starring Ahn Nae-sang, Oh Dae-gyu, Lee Joon-hyuk, Park In-hwan, Do Ji-won, Kim Hee-jung and Oh Ji-eun. It aired on KBS2 from October 17, 2009, to June 13, 2010, on Saturdays and Sundays at 19:55 for 70 episodes.

One of the highest-rated Korean dramas in the year it aired, it topped the TV viewership ratings chart throughout its run, reaching 40%. Because of its high ratings, the originally scheduled 50 episodes was extended by 20 more. The family drama revolves around a retired police officer and his three very different sons—one is bankrupt, one is a successful businessman, and one is a police officer who marries an ex-convict's daughter.

== Plot ==
Kim Soon-kyung is a retired police officer and father of three sons, Geon-kang, Hyun-chal and Yi-sang.

Eldest son Geon-kang has experienced many trials and failures in life, including bankruptcy and divorce. He later gets remarried to his wife Chung-nan.

Middle son Hyun-chal is a successful businessman, the envy of the town and pride of his father. His wife Woo-mi often sacrifices her happiness for the benefit of their family.

Youngest son Yi-sang followed in his father's footsteps by becoming a police officer. But father and the son often clash, especially when Yi-sang marries Eo-young. Eo-young is the daughter of his father's deadly foe, an ex-convict Soon-kyung investigated and eventually arrested a long time ago.

== Cast ==
=== Kim family ===
- Park In-hwan as Kim Soon-kyung (김순경) (father)
- Lee Hyo-choon as Jeon Kwa-ja (전과자) (mother)
- Ahn Nae-sang as Kim Geon-kang (김건강) (eldest son)
  - Do Ji-won as Uhm Chung-nan (엄청난) (Geon-kang's wife)
  - Jung Yoon-seok as Jong-nam (종남) (Chung-nan's son)
- Oh Dae-gyu as Kim Hyun-chal (김현찰) (middle son, businessman)
  - Kim Hee-jung as Do Woo-mi (도우미) (Hyun-chal's wife)
  - Kim Jin-seong as Kim Hyun-soo (김혼수) (Hyun-chal and Woo-mi's older son)
  - Kwon Min-jong as Kim Sang-tae (김상태) (Hyun-chal and Woo-mi's younger son)
- Lee Joon-hyuk as Kim Yi-sang (김이상) (youngest son, police officer)

=== Joo family ===
- Oh Ji-eun as Joo Eo-young (주어영) (Kim Yi-sang's girlfriend)
- Roh Joo-hyun as Joo Beom-in (주범인) (Eo-young's father)
- Jang Da-yoon as Joo Boo-young (주부영) (Eo-young's younger sister)
- Kim Hee-ryeong as Mrs. Joo (Eo-young's mother)

=== Supporting cast ===
- Bang Joong-hyun as Ha Haeng-sun (하행선) (Uhm Chung-nan's ex-boyfriend)
- Lee Sang-sook as Jo Nan-ja (조난자) (Uhm Chung-nan's friend, caretaker of Jong-nam)
- Lee Bo-hee as Gye Sol-yi (계솔이) (Do Woo-mi's mother)
- Kim Ae-ran as Tae Yeon-hee (태연희) (Kim Hyun-chal's secretary)
- Lee Jang-woo as Baek Ma-tan (police officer, Kim Yi-sang's friend)
- Son Jong-beom as Yoo Chi-jang (유치장) (police officer, Kim Yi-sang's colleague)
- Lee Jung-Gil as Cho Woo-sun (최우선) (police officer, Kim Yi-sang's colleague)
- Kim Min-hyuk as Jo Sa-jung (조사중)
- Na Jong-soo as Bang Beom-yong (방범용)
- Shin Yong-kyu as Ji Koo-dae (지구대)
- Yoo Seung-bong as Lee Sang-han (이상한) (police chief)
- Yoon Joo-hee as Lee Tae-baek (이태백) (Lee Sang-han's daughter)
- Go Se-won as Wang Jae-soo (왕재수) (Joo Eo-young's ex-boyfriend)
- Im Seo-yeon as Ji Seong-mi (지성미) (Wang Jae-soo's fiancée)
- Yoo Jang-young as Na Dong-ki (나동기)
- Im Seung-dae as Intelligence Investigator (지능수사과 형사)
- Shin Sae-jin
- Son Min-hee
- Park Sung-kyun

== Awards and nominations ==
Year	Award	Category	Recipient	Result
2009	KBS Drama Awards	Excellence Award, Actor in a Serial Drama	Ahn Nae-sang	Nominated
2009	KBS Drama Awards	Excellence Award, Actor in a Serial Drama	Lee Joon-hyuk	Nominated
2009	KBS Drama Awards	Excellence Award, Actress in a Serial Drama	Do Ji-won	Nominated
2009	KBS Drama Awards	Best Supporting Actor	Go Se-won	Nominated
2009	KBS Drama Awards	Best Supporting Actress	Lee Bo-hee	Nominated
2009	KBS Drama Awards	Best New Actress	Oh Ji-eun	Nominated
2009	KBS Drama Awards	Best Couple Award	Lee Joon-hyuk and Oh Ji-eun	Nominated
2010	KBS Drama Awards	Excellence Award, Actor in a Daily Drama	Park In-hwan	Nominated
2010	KBS Drama Awards	Excellence Award, Actress in a Daily Drama	Do Ji-won	Nominated
2010	KBS Drama Awards	Excellence Award, Actress in a Daily Drama	Kim Hee-jung	Nominated
2010	KBS Drama Awards	Excellence Award, Actress in a Daily Drama	Lee Bo-hee	Nominated
2010	KBS Drama Awards	Best Supporting Actress	Lee Bo-hee	Won
2010	KBS Drama Awards	Best New Actress	Oh Ji-eun	Won

== Ratings ==
Date	Episode	Nationwide	Seoul
2009-10-17	1	24.3 (1st)	24.3 (1st)
2009-10-18	2	28.2 (1st)	28.3 (1st)
2009-10-24	3	19.3 (1st)	19.4 (1st)
2009-10-25	4	25.6 (1st)	25.2 (1st)
2009-10-31	5	24.0 (1st)	24.9 (1st)
2009-11-01	6	27.6 (1st)	27.0 (1st)
2009-11-07	7	24.1 (1st)	23.4 (1st)
2009-11-08	8	30.6 (1st)	30.1 (1st)
2009-11-14	9	24.1 (1st)	24.0 (1st)
2009-11-15	10	28.4 (1st)	28.2 (1st)
2009-11-21	11	25.6 (1st)	25.2 (1st)
2009-11-22	12	32.5 (1st)	33.0 (1st)
2009-11-28	13	27.9 (1st)	28.3 (1st)
2009-11-29	14	32.6 (1st)	32.8 (1st)
2009-12-05	15	20.0 (2nd)	19.7 (2nd)
2009-12-06	16	32.4 (1st)	32.2 (1st)
2009-12-12	17	27.5 (1st)	27.3 (1st)
2009-12-13	18	32.6 (1st)	32.6 (1st)
2009-12-19	19	27.9 (1st)	27.8 (1st)
2009-12-20	20	34.2 (1st)	33.4 (1st)
2009-12-26	21	29.2 (1st)	28.6 (1st)
2009-12-27	22	34.2 (1st)	33.6 (1st)
2010-01-02	23	31.4 (1st)	31.2 (1st)
2010-01-03	24	38.5 (1st)	37.9 (1st)
2010-01-09	25	33.1 (1st)	32.8 (1st)
2010-01-10	26	37.9 (1st)	37.6 (1st)
2010-01-16	27	32.8 (1st)	32.9 (1st)
2010-01-17	28	40.2 (1st)	40.4 (1st)
2010-01-23	29	33.4 (1st)	33.1 (1st)
2010-01-24	30	39.7 (1st)	40.1 (1st)
2010-01-30	31	34.6 (1st)	34.6 (1st)
2010-01-31	32	41.7 (1st)	41.9 (1st)
2010-02-06	33	34.6 (1st)	34.7 (1st)
2010-02-07	34	41.7 (1st)	41.5 (1st)
2010-02-13	35	27.8 (1st)	27.1 (1st)
2010-02-14	36	21.1 (1st)	20.4 (1st)
2010-02-20	37	32.4 (1st)	31.8 (1st)
2010-02-21	38	38.1 (1st)	38.2 (1st)
2010-02-27	39	31.1 (1st)	30.7 (1st)
2010-02-28	40	37.5 (1st)	38.0 (1st)
2010-03-06	41	33.8 (1st)	33.0 (1st)
2010-03-07	42	39.9 (1st)	39.9 (1st)
2010-03-13	43	31.5 (1st)	30.6 (1st)
2010-03-14	44	39.9 (1st)	39.5 (1st)
2010-03-20	45	35.0 (1st)	34.4 (1st)
2010-03-21	46	39.5 (1st)	38.6 (1st)
2010-03-27	47	33.4 (1st)	33.1 (1st)
2010-03-28	48	40.5 (1st)	40.2 (1st)
2010-04-03	49	33.6 (1st)	32.7 (1st)
2010-04-04	50	37.0 (1st)	37.6 (1st)
2010-04-10	51	36.4 (1st)	36.2 (1st)
2010-04-11	52	42.5 (1st)	42.5 (1st)
2010-04-17	53	34.8 (1st)	35.1 (1st)
2010-04-18	54	41.6 (1st)	41.4 (1st)
2010-04-24	55	35.2 (1st)	35.2 (1st)
2010-04-25	56	40.3 (1st)	40.0 (1st)
2010-05-01	57	33.6 (1st)	32.9 (1st)
2010-05-02	58	42.0 (1st)	42.4 (1st)
2010-05-08	59	28.7 (1st)	28.1 (1st)
2010-05-09	60	42.0 (1st)	42.1 (1st)
2010-05-15	61-62	33.5 (1st)	33.6 (1st)
2010-05-22	63	36.4 (1st)	36.1 (1st)
2010-05-23	64	43.8 (1st)	43.8 (1st)
2010-05-29	65	33.9 (1st)	33.3 (1st)
2010-05-30	66	34.7 (1st)	35.7 (1st)
2010-06-05	67	35.6 (1st)	36.1 (1st)
2010-06-06	68	41.4 (1st)	41.5 (1st)
2010-06-12	69	20.5 (5th)	20.4 (5th)
2010-06-13	70	39.8 (1st)	40.4 (1st)
Average		-	-

Source: TNS Media Korea
