= Eoudong (film) =

- Theatrical poster for Eoudong (1985)
- Hangul: 어우동
- Hanja: 於宇同
- RR: Eoudong
- MR: Ŏudong
- Directed by: Lee Jang-ho
- Written by: Bang Ki-hwan
- Produced by: Lee Tae-won
- Starring: Lee Bo-hee; Ahn Sung-ki
- Cinematography: Park Seung-bae
- Edited by: Hyeon Dong-chun
- Music by: Lee Jong-gu
- Release date: September 28, 1985 (South Korea)
- Running time: 110 minutes
- Country: South Korea
- Language: Korean

Eoudong (Korean: 어우동) is a 1985 South Korean film starring Ahn Sung-ki and Lee Bo-hee. For her performance in the film, Lee Bo-hee won the best actress award at the Grand Bell Awards in 1986. The film was selected as the South Korean entry for the Best Foreign Language Film at the 58th Academy Awards but was not accepted as a nominee.

== Synopsis ==
The film is set in Korea's Joseon dynasty, during the reign of King Seonngjong, when strict Confucianism forced women to follow the male-dominant society.

== Reception ==
Eoudong was a successful film both at the box office and with the critics. It eventually sold over 500,000 tickets, and critics praised the film for its cinematography and depiction of the historical time period.

== Cast ==
- Lee Bo-hee as Uhwudong
- Ahn Sung-ki as Galmae
- Kim Myung-gon as Chungha
- Park Won-sook as Hyangji
- Shin Chaong-shik as Yun Phil-sang
- Kim Ki-ju as PArk Yun-chang
- Moon Tai-sun as Jeong Chang-son
- Kim Seong-chan
- Kim Ha-rim
- Yun Sun-hong as Seongjong of Joseon

== See also ==
- List of submissions to the 58th Academy Awards for Best Foreign Language Film
- List of South Korean submissions for the Academy Award for Best Foreign Language Film
