= Smile Again (2010 TV series) =

2010 South Korean television series

- Also known as: Smile, Dong-hae
- Hangul: 웃어라 동해야
- Hanja: 웃어라 東海야
- RR: Useora Donghaeya
- MR: Usŏra Tonghaeya
- Genre: Drama, Romance
- Written by: Moon Eun-ah
- Directed by: Kim Myung-wook; Mo Wan-il
- Starring: Ji Chang-wook; Do Ji-won; Oh Ji-eun; Park Jung-ah
- Country of origin: South Korea
- Original language: Korean
- No. of episodes: 159

Production
- Producer: Moon Bo-hyun
- Running time: 30 minutes

Original release
- Network: KBS1
- Release: 4 October 2010 – 13 May 2011

Smile Again (Korean: 웃어라 동해야; lit. 'Smile, Dong-hae') is a 2010 South Korean daily television drama, starring Ji Chang-wook, Do Ji-won, Oh Ji-eun, Park Jung-ah and Lee Jang-woo. It aired on Korean Broadcasting System's premier channel KBS1 from October 4, 2010 to May 13, 2011 on Mondays to Fridays at 20:25 (KST) for 159 episodes.

== Plot ==
As a child, Cho Dong-baek suffered brain damage from almost drowning, and was left amnesiac and with the mental capacity of a nine-year-old. She was later adopted by an American family and renamed Anna Laker. As a young adult, she fell in love with a Korean man, who used the English name James (aka Kim Joon), while he was studying abroad in New York, but due to personal circumstances, the two were separated. Back in South Korea, James/Joon married Hong Hye-sook, the adopted daughter of the Cho family, and had a son with her, Do-jin. Unknown to James, Anna also gave birth to their son, Carl Laker (aka Dong-hae). Twenty-seven years later, the Lakers relocate to Seoul for Carl to participate in a short track speed skating competition as a representative on the American team. While his career is abruptly ended from being struck in a traffic accident by a truck, Carl decides to stay in Korea and search for his father to ask him the reason why he left them. He and Anna are taken in by Lee Bong-yi, an aspiring chef who wants to be the first female head chef, and her family.

== Cast ==
=== Main ===
- Ji Chang-wook as Carl Laker / Kim Dong-hae
- Do Ji-won as Anna Laker / Jo Dong-baek
- Oh Ji-eun as Lee Bong-yi
- Lee Jang-woo as Kim Do-jin

=== Supporting ===
Lee family

- Im Chae-moo as Lee Kang-jae
- Lee Bo-hee as Gye Sun-ok
- Alex Chu as Lee Tae-hoon
- Kim Yu-seok as Lee Pil-jae
- Lee Joon-ha as Lee Song-yi, Pil-jae's daughter

Kim family

- Kang Seok-woo as Kim Joon / James
- Jung Ae-ri as Hong Hye-sook

Yoon family

- Park Hae-mi as Byun Sool-nyeo
- Park Jung-ah as Yoon Sae-hwa
- Lee Joo-yeon as Yoon Sae-young

=== Extended ===
- Kim Sung-won as Jo Pil-yong, Anna's birth father
- Jung Young-sook as Kim Mal-sun, Anna's birth mother
- Choi Yoon-so as Baek Yoo-jin
- Lee Jung-ho as Lee Dae-sam
- Jung Eun-woo as Kim Sun-woo
- Kim Jin-soo as Bang Ki-nam
- Kim Yoon-hee as Jung Soon-hye
- Kang Chul-sung as home shopping PD
- Kim Yoon-tae as home shopping PD
- Kim Sung-hoon as policeman
- Seo Hye-jin as nurse
- Ham Jin-sung as staff
- Shin Dong-yup as hotel restaurant kitchen assistant (cameo)
- Yoon Jong-shin as hotel restaurant kitchen assistant (cameo)
- Min Joon-hyun
- Jung Soo-in

== Awards ==
2011 KBS Drama Awards

- Excellence Award, Actor in a Daily Drama: Ji Chang-wook
- Excellence Award, Actress in a Daily Drama: Do Ji-won
- Best Supporting Actress: Park Jung-ah
- Best New Actor: Lee Jang-woo

== International broadcast ==
- It aired in Vietnam on TodayTV VTC7 from July 28, 2011 – November 2, 2011.
- It was aired in the Philippines on GMA Network from August 20, 2012 to April 19, 2013 on GMA Afternoon Prime.
