= You My Rose Mellow =

- Film poster
- Hangul: 접시꽃 당신
- Hanja: 접시꽃 當身
- RR: Jeopsikkot dangsin
- MR: Chŏpsikkot tangsin
- Directed by: Park Chul-soo
- Written by: Gwon Hyeon-suk
- Produced by: Hwang Gi-seong; Park Yong-bin
- Starring: Lee Deok-hwa; Lee Bo-hee
- Cinematography: Jin Young-ho
- Edited by: Ree Kyoung-ja
- Music by: Shin Byung-ha
- Production company: Hwang Gi-seong Productions
- Release date: March 19, 1988
- Running time: 110 minutes
- Country: South Korea
- Language: Korean

You My Rose Mellow (Korean: 접시꽃 당신; RR: Jeopsikkot dangsin) is a 1988 South Korean drama film directed by Park Chul-soo and starring Lee Deok-hwa and Lee Bo-hee. The film is based on the poetry collection with the same name by poet Do Jong-hwan.

== Plot ==
Jong-hwan and Su-kyung meet in a cafe. Jong-hwan is a high-school teacher and Su-kyung is a cafe maid. They fall in love and marry; however, when Jong-hwan goes to take care of his family, Su-kyung gets ill, forcing him to care for her.

== Cast ==
- Lee Deok-hwa ... Jong-hwan
- Lee Bo-hee ... Su-kyung
- Jung Hye-sun
- Kwon Sung-duck
- Moon Mi-bong
- Mun Chang-gil
- Chung Hae-sung
- Park Hui-u
- Choe Sung-kwan
- Kim Gi-jong
