= Do Ji-won =

South Korean actress (born 1966)

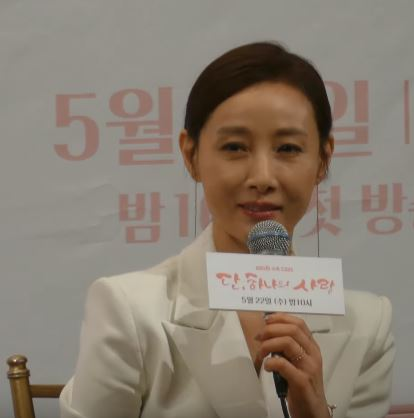
- Do in 2019
- Born: February 14, 1966 (age 60); Seoul, South Korea
- Education: Hanyang University - Dance
- Occupation: Actress
- Years active: 1989–present
- Agent: Namoo Actors

Korean name
- Hangul: 도지원
- Hanja: 都知嫄
- RR: Do Jiwon
- MR: To Chiwŏn

Do Ji-won (Korean: 도지원; born February 14, 1966) is a South Korean actress. She is best known for her roles in Ladies of the Palace (2001), Punch Lady (2007), and Smile Again (2010).

== Career ==
Upon her graduation as a dance major from Hanyang University in 1988, Do Ji-won joined the Korea National Ballet. She was selected as the model for the ballet company's advertisements, which led to her debut in the entertainment industry. She began acting in television dramas such as Seoul Ddukbaegi (1990) and Kareisky (1994). In 2001, she portrayed her most famous role as King Jungjong's 4th consort Park Gyeong Bin in the historical drama Ladies of the Palace, which brought her acting recognition and popularity.

On the big screen, she and Shin Se-kyung played mother and daughter in Cinderella, a 2006 horror film about a serial killer targeting high school girls who've had facial plastic surgery. And in the comedy-drama Punch Lady (2007), Do gave a well-reviewed performance in the leading role of a battered housewife who trains hard to master the art of fighting after publicly announcing a duel on the ring with her abusive husband (Son Hyun-joo), who happens to be a mixed martial arts champion.

Aside from the occasional leading role in series such as Our Happy Ending (2008), Do has remained active on television mostly in supporting roles, notably as Ahn Nae-sang's estranged wife in Three Brothers (2009), and as Ji Chang-wook's mentally challenged mother in Smile Again (also known as Smile, Dong-hae, 2010).

== Personal life ==
In July 1998, Do was kidnapped by a man and a woman who threatened the actress with a knife in the parking lot of a sports center in Seoul. The couple stuffed Do in the trunk of a car and drove around for five hours before releasing her after extorting ₩14 million.

== Filmography ==
=== Television drama ===
- My Girlfriend Is the Man! (KBS2, 2025)
- Buried Hearts (SBS, 2025)
- No Matter What (KBS1, 2020)
- Angel's Last Mission: Love (KBS2, 2019)
- Bravo My Life (SBS, 2017–2018)
- Queen for Seven Days (KBS2, 2017)
- My Daughter, Geum Sa-wol (MBC, 2015–2016)
- Unkind Ladies (KBS2, 2015)
- Healer (KBS2, 2014–2015)
- Golden Rainbow (MBC, 2013–2014)
- Pure Love (KBS2, 2013)
- Missing You (MBC, 2012–2013)
- Smile Again (KBS1, 2010–2011)
- Three Brothers (KBS2, 2009–2010)
- General Hospital 2 (MBC, 2008–2009)
- Our Happy Ending (MBC, 2008)
- Conspiracy in the Court (KBS2, 2007)
- Toji, the Land (SBS, 2004–2005)
- Mom's Song (SBS, 2002)
- Ladies of the Palace (SBS, 2001–2002)
- KBS TV Novel – "Landscape with Bridge" (KBS2, 2000)
- Cruise of Love (KBS2, 2000)
- Ad Madness (KBS2, 1999–2000)
- Paper Crane (KBS2, 1998–1999)
- Will Make You Happy (KBS2, 1998)
- Legend of Heroes (MBC, 1997–1998)
- The Brother's River (SBS, 1996–1997)
- Men of the Bath House (KBS2, 1995–1996)
- Hotel (MBC, 1995)
- Kareisky (MBC, 1994–1995)
- Adam's City (MBC, 1994–1995)
- Happiness Without You (MBC, 1993)
- Stormy Season (MBC, 1993)
- Ilchul Peak (MBC, 1992)
- Keep Your Voice Down (SBS, 1991)
- Burn Like a Candle (KBS2, 1991)
- Seoul Ddukbaegi (KBS1, 1990–1991)
- Two Diaries (MBC, 1990)
- Erased Woman (KBS2, 1990)
- Half a Failure (KBS2, 1989)

=== Film ===
- Entangled (2014)
- Modern Boy (2008)
- Punch Lady (2007)
- Love Me Not (2006)
- Cinderella (2006)
- Barefoot Ki-bong (2006)
- Flying Boys (2004)
- Hallelujah (1997)

=== Radio show ===
- Do Ji-won's Popular Songs (KBS 2FM, 1992)

== Awards ==
- 2011 KBS Drama Awards: Excellence Award, Actress in a Daily Drama (Smile Again)
- 2001 SBS Drama Awards: Top Excellence Award, Actress (Ladies of the Palace)
- 2001 SBS Drama Awards: Top 10 Stars (Ladies of the Palace)
- 1990 KBS Drama Awards: Best New Actress (Seoul Ddukbaegi)
