= Living Among the Rich =

2011 South Korean television series

- Promotional poster
- Also known as: I Live in Cheongdam-dong
- Hangul: 청담동 살아요
- RR: Cheongdam-dong sarayo
- MR: Ch'ŏngdam-dong sarayo
- Genre: Sitcom
- Written by: Park Hae-young
- Directed by: Kim Seok-yoon; Lim Hyun-wook; Lee Sang-mi
- Starring: Kim Hye-ja; Oh Ji-eun; Hyun Woo; Lee Sang-yeob; Lee Bo-hee
- Country of origin: South Korea
- Original language: Korean
- No. of episodes: 170

Production
- Producer: Jung Tae-joong
- Running time: 30 minutes
- Production company: HiCC Media

Original release
- Network: JTBC
- Release: December 5, 2011 – August 3, 2012

Living Among the Rich (Korean: 청담동 살아요; lit. 'I Live in Cheongdam-dong') is a 2011–2012 South Korean television series starring Kim Hye-ja, Oh Ji-eun, Hyun Woo, Lee Sang-yeob and Lee Bo-hee. It aired on JTBC from December 5, 2011, to August 3, 2012.

== Synopsis ==
The story revolves around Kim Hye-ja (Kim Hye-ja) and her daughter Oh Ji-eun (Oh Ji-eun) after they move to the luxurious neighborhood of Cheongdam-dong, in Seoul, after living in the suburbs for years. Their new building turns out to be completely different from their expectations.

== Cast ==
=== Main ===
- Kim Hye-ja as Kim Hye-ja
- Oh Ji-eun as Oh Ji-eun
- Hyun Woo as Hyun Woo
- Lee Sang-yeob as Lee Sang-yeob
- Lee Bo-hee as Lee Bo-hee
- Seo Seung-hyun as Seo Seung-hyun
- Woo Hyun as Kim Woo-hyun
- Choi Moo-sung as Choi Moo-sung
- Hwang Jung-min as Hwang Jung-min
- Oh Sang-hoon as Oh Sang-hoon

=== Supporting ===
- Jo Kwan-woo as Jo Kwan-woo
- Song Ji-in as Kim Bo-ra
- Shin Yeon-sook as Park Soon-ae
- Yoon Bo-hyun as Yoon Bo-hyun

=== Special appearances ===
- Jung Yun-ho
- Yoon Doo-joon
- Ahn Nae-sang
- BtoB
