= Urban Hive =

- Urban Hive in 2019

General information
- Type: Office
- Location: 476, Gangnam-daero, Gangnam-gu, Seoul
- Construction started: 2004
- Completed: 2009

Technical details
- Floor area: 584.78 m^{2} (6,294.5 sq ft)

Design and construction
- Architects: In-Cheurl Kim, Archium

The Urban Hive is a building designed by architect In-Cheurl Kim, located at the address of 200-7 Nonhyun-dong, Gangnam-gu in Seoul, Korea. The building is called the Urban Hive because of its unusual honeycomb exterior structure. This honeycomb motif is not simply aesthetic, this unique method of supporting the structural weight of the building with the honeycombed concrete exterior imparts unique benefits for the interior spaces of the building.

There are no columns and or load-bearing framework inside of the building. Due to this unique construction, the Urban Hive is able to have a unique exterior motif and bigger spaces inside of the building than other buildings built in Korea, using more common curtain wall techniques of construction. Commonly, when high-rises are built, architects and engineers use steel framed foundations on the ground and build up using concrete with constructive materials in the interior of buildings to support the weight of a skyscraper. However, In-cheurl Kim, the architect of the Urban Hive, tried to make other types of buildings not like others which are built as the conventional ways. With his effort of three-year-designing, a new concept of building a skyscraper has been yielded in Korea.

With the new structural way of construction, the Urban Hive obtained the grand prize in the Seoul Architecture Award in 2009. It was 27th of the mater pieces which were awarded the same prize.

== Summary ==
- Architect: In-Cheurl Kim, Archium
- Address: 200-7 Nonhyeon-dong, Gangnam-gu, Seoul, Korea
- Plottage: 1,000.90 m^2
- Floor Area: 584.78 m^2
- Total Floor Area: 10,166.89 m^2
- Floor Space Index: 798.69%
- Build Space: b4/17f
- Structure: Reinforced concrete (RC) + T-type Steel composite beam (TSC)
- Design Period: June 2004 ~ April 2007
- Construction Period: February 2006 ~ September 2009
- Client: Urban Hive Inc.

== Honeycomb Structure ==
The height of the Urban Hive is about seventy meters. Using an outside concrete wall instead of curtain wall structure, it is relatively hard to make a building this high because of the weight of concrete. The Urban Hive used honeycomb structure frame for the outside wall. Honeycomb structure looks like hexagon shapes of a hive. The middle of each hexagon is left to be empty. With this emptied hall, the weight of concrete wall could have been reduced. Also, honeycomb structure is known as the strongest structure in the nature.

As you can see in the picture, around the hole in the middle, there are steel reinforcements weaved with great delicacy. This kind of structure is called diagrid. A hole is 1.5 meters in diameter, and there are 3371 holes total in the outside wall of the Urban Hive. With this great number of holes, the Urban Hive could reduce great amount of weight in concrete. This is why the Urban Hive could go up to seventy meters with concrete wall.

== Seoul Architecture Award ==
The Urban Hive awarded the grand prize in Seoul Architecture Award in 2009. The examiners of the Seoul Architecture Award judged the Urban Hive as followings.

The Urban Hive presents a new paradigm in tall building in high-density cities. Effectiveness in organization of non-living spaces, application of double walls to support the building from wind in high altitude, and difference in creativeness in designing a building from others were the most important parts that we chose this building. .

== About The Architect ==
In Cheurl Kim was born in 1947, he graduated in 1972 from Hong-ik University and later earned a M.A. in architecture from Kook-min University in 1981. Um, Duk-moon's firm recruited him out Hong-ik University, he continued to work for the firm for fourteen years. In 1986, In-Cheurl Kim founded Inje Construction. Later in 1995, he renamed Inje Construction Archium. He works with Korean traditional mind based on 'the beauty of absence.'

- 1947 - born in Jin Hae, Korea
- 1972 - graduated from Hong-ik University, School of Architecture, worked at the office of Aum, dok-moon
  - 1981 - M.A. Architecture, school of architecture, Kukmin University
  - 1986 - founded INJE Construction
  - 1988 - personal exhibition at Yun-hee plastic art hall
  - 1989 - Kim, In-cheurl work collection
  - 1995 - renamed INJE to be ARCHIUM
  - 1996 - awarded by KIA (Ik-san Children's House)
  - 1997 - third prize in Seoul Architecture Award (nomad)
  - 1998 - third prize in Seoul Architecture Award (mesotron)
  - 1999 - awarded by Korea Architectural Culture (Kim, Ok-gil Memorial Hall), third prize in Seoul Architecture Award (Kim, Ok-gil Memorial Hall)
  - 2007 - Kim, Shoo Geun Prize (Woongjin Paju office)
  - 2009 - awarded the grand prize in Seoul Architecture Award (Urban Hive)
  - Present - professor of department of architecture, Chung-Ang University
