= List of tallest buildings in South Korea =

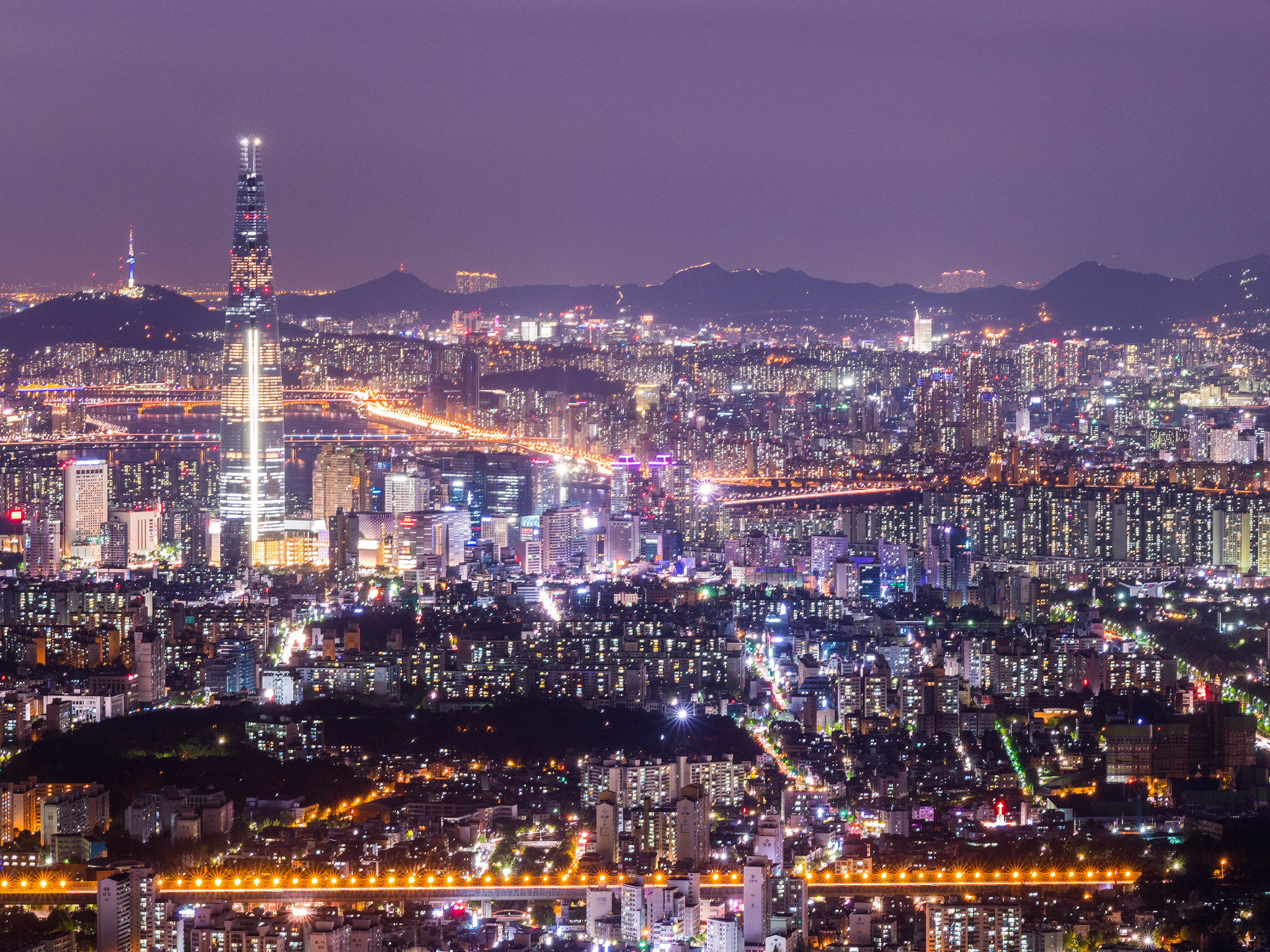
Seoul skyline at night in 2016

This list ranks skyscrapers in South Korea by height. The tallest building in South Korea is currently the 123-story Lotte World Tower, which rises 554 metres (1,818 ft) and was completed on 22 December 2016. It is also the world's sixth tallest building. Other buildings at least 300 m (980 ft) tall include the three-building complex Haeundae LCT The Sharp in Busan (411 m (1,348 ft)), Tower A of the Parc1 complex in Seoul's Yeouido district (333 m (1,093 ft)), the Northeast Asia Trade Tower in Incheon (305 m (1,001 ft)), and Tower A of the Haeundae Doosan We've the Zenith complex in Busan (300 m (984 ft)).

The Hyundai Global Business Center, which began construction in May 2020 in Seoul's Gangnam District, is expected to become South Korea's tallest building upon completion in 2030. Also under construction is the Cheongna City Tower in Incheon, although this structure is likely to eventually be classified as a tower rather than a building.

== Tallest buildings ==
This list ranks buildings in South Korea that stand at least 200 metres (656 ft) tall.

Was the tallest building in South Korea upon completion

Rank	Name	Image	Height	Floors	Year	City	Notes
1	Lotte World Tower		555.7 m (1,823 ft)	123	2017	Seoul	Tallest building in South Korea and sixth tallest in the world.
2	Haeundae LCT The Sharp Landmark Tower		411.6 m (1,350 ft)	101	2019	Busan	Tallest building in Busan.
3	Haeundae LCT The Sharp Tower A		339.1 m (1,113 ft)	85	2019	Busan	
4	Haeundae LCT The Sharp Tower B		333.1 m (1,093 ft)	85	2019	Busan	
5	Parc1 Tower A		322.0 m (1,056.4 ft)	69	2020	Seoul	
6	Northeast Asia Trade Tower		305.0 m (1,000.7 ft)	68	2014	Incheon	Tallest building in Incheon.
7	Haeundae Doosan We've the Zenith Tower A		300.0 m (984.3 ft)	80	2011	Busan	
8	Haeundae I'Park Marina Tower 2		292.1 m (958 ft)	72	2011	Busan	
9	Busan International Finance Center		289.0 m (948.2 ft)	63	2014	Busan	
10	Three IFC Office Tower		284.0 m (931.8 ft)	55	2012	Seoul	
11	Haeundae Doosan We've the Zenith Tower B		281.5 m (924 ft)	75	2011	Busan	
12	Haeundae I'Park Marina Tower 1		272.9 m (895 ft)	72	2011	Busan	
13	Haeundae Doosan We've the Zenith Tower C		265.0 m (869.4 ft)	71	2011	Busan	
14	Samsung Tower Palace 3 Tower G		263.7 m (865 ft)	69	2004	Seoul	Tallest residential building in Seoul.
15	Mok-dong Hyperion I Tower A		256.0 m (839.9 ft)	69	2003	Seoul	
16	63 Building		249 m (817 ft)	60	1985	Seoul	When completed in July 1985, it was the tallest building outside of North America.
16	Metapolis 101		249 m (817 ft)	66	2010	Hwaseong	
18	Songdo American Town I'Park Tower 201		247.8 m (813 ft)	70	2025	Incheon	
18	Metapolis 104		247.4 m (812 ft)	66	2010	Hwaseong	
19	Parc1 Tower B		247.1 m (811 ft)	53	2020	Seoul	
20	Hillstate Ijin Bay City Tower A		247 m (810 ft)	69	2022	Busan	
21	The W 101		246 m (807 ft)	69	2018	Busan	
21	The W 102		246 m (807 ft)	69	2018	Busan	
21	The W 103		246 m (807 ft)	69	2018	Busan	
21	The W 104		246 m (807 ft)	69	2018	Busan	
25	Federation of Korean Industries Head Office Building		245 m (804 ft)	50	2013	Seoul	
26	Cheonan Pentaport Tower 103		239 m (784 ft)	66	2011	Cheonan	
26	Mok-dong Hyperion I Tower B		239 m (784 ft)	69	2003	Seoul	
28	Jungdong Gumho Richensia Tower 1		238 m (781 ft)	66	2009	Bucheon	
28	Jungdong Gumho Richensia Tower 2		238 m (781 ft)	66	2009	Bucheon	
30	Songdo The Sharp First World Tower 1		235 m (771 ft)	65	2009	Incheon	
30	Songdo The Sharp First World Tower 2		235 m (771 ft)	64	2009	Incheon	
30	Songdo The Sharp First World Tower 3		235 m (771 ft)	64	2009	Incheon	
30	Songdo The Sharp First World Tower 4		235 m (771 ft)	64	2009	Incheon	
34	Tower Palace One Tower B		234 m (768 ft)	66	2003	Seoul	
35	Ilsan Doosan We've The Zenith 105		230 m (750 ft)	59	2013	Goyang	
35	Ilsan Doosan We've The Zenith 104		230 m (750 ft)	57	2013	Goyang	
35	Yojin Y-City 103		230 m (750 ft)	59	2016	Goyang	
35	Yojin Y-City 104		230 m (750 ft)	59	2016	Goyang	
35	Yojin Y-City 105		230 m (750 ft)	59	2016	Goyang	
40	Trade Tower		228 m (748 ft)	55	1988	Seoul	
41	Cheongnyangni Station Lotte Castle SKY-L65 D		226 m (741 ft)	65	2023	Seoul	
41	Cheongnyangni Station Lotte Castle SKY-L65 B		226 m (741 ft)	65	2023	Seoul	
43	Yojin Y-City 102		225 m (738 ft)	55	2016	Goyang	
43	Suseong SK Leader's View Tower A		225 m (738 ft)	57	2010	Daegu	
43	Suseong SK Leader's View Tower B		225 m (738 ft)	57	2010	Daegu	
46	Metapolis 102		224 m (735 ft)	60	2010	Hwaseong	
47	Ilsan Doosan We've The Zenith 102		224 m (735 ft)	54	2013	Goyang	
48	Cheongnyangni Station Lotte Castle SKY-L65 A		223 m (732 ft)	64	2023	Seoul	
49	Yojin Y-City 106		221 m (725 ft)	57	2016	Goyang	
50	TP Tower		220 m (720 ft)	42	2024	Seoul	
51	Cheongnyangni Station Lotte Castle SKY-L65 C		219 m (719 ft)	63	2023	Seoul	
52	Ilsan Doosan We've The Zenith 103		215 m (705 ft)	54	2013	Goyang	
52	Ilsan Doosan We've The Zenith 106		215 m (705 ft)	54	2013	Goyang	
54	Yojin Y-City 101		214 m (702 ft)	55	2016	Goyang	
55	Posco the Sharp Centum Star Tower B		212 m (696 ft)	60	2008	Busan	
56	Ilsan Doosan We've The Zenith 101		212 m (696 ft)	53	2013	Goyang	
56	Ilsan Doosan We've The Zenith 107		212 m (696 ft)	53	2013	Goyang	
58	Tower Palace One Tower A		209 m (686 ft)	59	2002	Seoul	
58	Tower Palace One Tower C		209 m (686 ft)	59	2002	Seoul	
60	Artwin Tower 1		208 m (682 ft)	60	2015	Incheon	
61	Artwin Tower 2		208 m (682 ft)	60	2015	Incheon	
62	Seomyeon The Sharp Central Star Tower A		207 m (679 ft)	58	2011	Busan	
62	Songdo Campus Town IPARK 101		207 m (679 ft)	55	2016	Incheon	
64	Ilsan Doosan We've The Zenith 108		206 m (676 ft)	51	2013	Goyang	
65	Haeundae I'Park Marina Tower 3		205 m (673 ft)	46	2011	Busan	
66	Gangnam Finance Center		204 m (669 ft)	45	2000	Seoul	
67	Samsung Electronics Headquarters		203 m (666 ft)	44	2008	Seoul	
68	Metapolis 103		203 m (666 ft)	50	2010	Hwaseong	
69	Seoul Trimage Tower I		201 m (659 ft)	47	2017	Seoul	
69	Seoul Trimage Tower II		201 m (659 ft)	47	2017	Seoul	
69	Mok-dong Hyperion Tower C		201 m (659 ft)	54	2003	Seoul	
69	Taehwa-River Iaan Exordium Tower 1		201 m (659 ft)	54	2010	Ulsan	
69	Taehwa-River Iaan Exordium Tower 2		201 m (659 ft)	54	2010	Ulsan	
69	Raemian Caelitus Tower 1		201 m (659 ft)	56	2015	Seoul	
75	Centum Leadersmark		200 m (660 ft)	46	2008	Busan	
75	Hyupsong Marina G7 A		200 m (660 ft)	61	2021	Busan	
75	Hyupsong Marina G7 B		200 m (660 ft)	61	2021	Busan	

== Under construction, on-hold, approved and proposed ==
=== Under construction ===
This list ranks buildings under construction in South Korea that are planned to stand at least 200 metres (656 ft) tall.

Name	Height	Floors	Year	City	Notes
Busan Lotte Tower	342 m (1,122 ft)	67	2028	Busan	
Blanc Summit 74	263 m (863 ft)	69	2028	Busan	
Hanwha Forena Cheonan-Asan Stn. Tower A	251.1 m (824 ft)	70	2027	Asan	Also includes the following towers of unknown height: Tower B (63 floors), Tower C (57 floors)
Angsana Residence Yeouido Seoul	249.9 m (820 ft)	57	2026	Seoul	
Lotte Castle De Mer A	213 m (699 ft)	59	2025	Busan	
Lotte Castle De Mer B	213 m (699 ft)	59	2025	Busan	

=== On hold ===
This list ranks buildings on hold in South Korea that plan to stand at least 180 metres (591 ft) tall.

Name	Height	Floors	Year	City	Notes
Cheongna City Tower	448 m (1,470 ft)	26	2026	Incheon	
Ttukseom Buyeong Apartment A	199 m (653 ft)	49	2022	Seoul	
Ttukseom Buyeong Apartment B	199 m (653 ft)	49	2022	Seoul	
Ttukseom Buyeong Hotel	199 m (653 ft)	49	2022	Seoul	

=== Approved or proposed ===
This list ranks approved or proposed buildings in South Korea that plan to stand at least 180 metres (591 ft) tall.

Name	Height	Floors	Year	City	Notes
I-Core City Landmark I	420 m (1,380 ft)	103	2030	Incheon	
CJ Live City Tower	370 m (1,210 ft)	88		Goyang	
The Gate Centum A	308 m (1,010 ft)	73	2026	Busan	Approved
The Gate Centum B	308 m (1,010 ft)	73	2026	Busan	Approved
New Seoul Trade Tower	300 m (980 ft)		2023	Seoul	Proposed
Ulsan Innovation City Shinsegae Complex	300 m (980 ft)	82	2026	Ulsan	Proposed
Beomil Prugio	260 m (850 ft)	69	2025	Busan	Complex to include 3 buildings, exact height of other buildings unknown
Seocho Lotte Town	250 m (820 ft)	60	2025	Seoul	Proposed
Samick Beach Apartments Reconstruction	198 m (650 ft)	61	2025	Busan	Complex will include 12 towers with tallest one reaching 61 floors and 198 meters. Height of other towers unknown

List of other buildings planned over 55 floors for which the height has not been disclosed:

Name	Height	Floors	Completion	City	Notes
North Harbor SKY.V Tower A		77		Busan	
North Harbor SKY.V Tower B		77		Busan	
IFC Xi The Sky		70	2028	Busan	Complex to include multiple buildings
Bucheon Media Culture Complex Hotel		70	2027	Bucheon	Complex to include multiple buildings
I-Core City Landmark II		70	2030	Incheon	
Daejeon Station Hanwha U-Link Redevelopment		69	2025	Daejeon	Complex to include multiple buildings
Former Pohang Station Shinsegae Group Redevelopment		69	-	Pohang	Complex to include multiple buildings
Cheonan Ssangyong-dong Rededevelopment		69	2026	Cheonan	Complex to include multiple buildings
Xi The River Ichon		68	-	Seoul	Complex to include multiple buildings
Daegu Former City Hall Mega Library		65	-	Daegu	
Busan Citizens Park Redevelopment Area 1		65	-	Busan	
Busan Citizens Park Redevelopment Area 2-1		65	-	Busan	
Yongdu Area 1-6 Redevelopment		61		Seoul	
Ulsan Global Energy Business Center		60	2029	Ulsan	
Busan Citizens Park Redevelopment Area 3		60	-	Busan	
Busan Citizens Park Redevelopment Area 4		60	-	Busan	
Yeouido Sibeom Apartments Reconstruction		60	-	Seoul	
Xi Hillstate Hypercity		56	2028	Busan	Complex to include multiple buildings

== Timeline of tallest buildings ==
Name	Image	Height	Floors	Years	City	Notes
Seosomun KAL Building		82 m (269 ft)	23	1969–1970	Seoul	
31 Building		114 m (374 ft)	31	1970–1979	Seoul	
Lotte Hotel Seoul		138 m (453 ft)	37	1979–1985	Seoul	
63 Building		249 m (817 ft)	61	1985–2003	Seoul	
Mok-dong Hyperion I Tower A		256 m (840 ft)	69	2003–2004	Seoul	
Samsung Tower Palace 3 Tower G		264 m (866 ft)	69	2004–2011	Seoul	Tallest residential building in Seoul.
Haeundae Doosan We've the Zenith Tower A		300 m (980 ft)	80	2011–2014	Busan	Tallest residential building in Korea and tallest building in Busan.
Northeast Asia Trade Tower		305 m (1,001 ft)	68	2014–2017	Incheon	Tallest building in Incheon.
Lotte World Tower		555 m (1,821 ft)	123	2017–present	Seoul	Tallest building in South Korea and sixth tallest in the world.

== Tallest buildings by administrative divisions ==
This is the list of the tallest buildings by top tier South Korean administrative divisions.

Administrative division	Secondary division	Name	Image	Height	Floors	Year	Notes
Seoul	Songpa-gu	Lotte World Tower		555 m (1,821 ft)	123	2017	
Busan	Haeundae-gu	Haeundae LCT The Sharp Landmark Tower		411 m (1,348 ft)	101	2019	
Incheon	Yeonsu-gu	Northeast Asia Trade Tower		305 m (1,001 ft)	68	2011	
Gyeonggi Province	Hwaseong	Metapolis 101		249 m (817 ft)	66	2010	
South Chungcheong Province	Cheonan	Cheonan Pentaport		239 m (784 ft)	66	2011	
Ulsan	Jung-gu	Taehwa-River Iaan Exordium Tower 1		201 m (659 ft)	54	2010	
South Gyeongsang Province	Changwon	Changwon Metro City 2 Tower 207		196 m (643 ft)	55	2015	
Daejeon	Yuseong-gu	Daejeon Shinsegae Art & Science		193 m (633 ft)	43	2021	
Sejong	Naseong-dong	Sejong Hanshin The Hue Reserve Building 601		188 m (617 ft)	49	2021	
Daegu	Suseong-gu	Suseong SK Leader's View Tower A		186 m (610 ft)	57	2010	
North Chungcheong Province	Cheongju	Hillstate Cheongju Central		185 m (607 ft)	49	2025	
Jeju Province	Jeju City	Jeju Dream Tower A		169 m (554 ft)	38	2020	
South Jeolla Province	Mokpo	Mokpo Hadang S-CLASS Centum View 104		164.75 m (540.5 ft)	49	2022	
Gangwon Province	Chuncheon	Chuncheon Central Prugio		160 m (520 ft)	49	2022	
Gwangju	Seo-gu	Hoban Summit Gwangju 101		158.11 m (518.7 ft)	48	2020	
North Jeolla Province	Jeonju	Forena Jeonju Ecocity 104		153.78 m (504.5 ft)	45	2023	
North Gyeongsang Province	Gimcheon	KEPCO E&C Headquarters		141 m (463 ft)	28	2015	

== Tallest structures ==
Rank	Name	Image	Height	City	Use	Year	Notes
1	Seoul Tower		237 m (778 ft)	Seoul	Observation, communication	1971	
2	Woobang Tower		202 m (663 ft)	Daegu	Observation	1992	
3	Busan Tower		120 m (390 ft)	Busan	Observation	1973	

== See also ==
- List of tallest buildings
- List of tallest buildings in Busan
- List of tallest buildings in Incheon
- List of tallest buildings in Seoul
