= Haeundae LCT The Sharp =

Luxury development in Busan, South Korea

- 해운대 엘시티 더샵
- Haeundae LCT The Sharp in 2020
- Interactive map of the Haeundae LCT The Sharp area

General information
- Status: Completed
- Type: 1 hotel/residential tower and 2 residential towers
- Location: Jung-dong, Haeundae District, Busan, South Korea, 1058-2 Jung-1(il)dong, Haeundae-gu, Busan
- Coordinates: 35°09′37.10″N 129°10′08.40″E
- Construction started: October 28, 2013
- Completed: November 30, 2019
- Owner: (South Korea) LCT

Height
- Architectural: Landmark Tower: 411.6 m (1,350 ft); Residential Tower A: 339.1 m (1,113 ft); Residential Tower B: 333 m (1,093 ft)
- Observatory: BUSAN X the SKY

Technical details
- Floor count: Landmark Tower: 101; Residential Tower A: 85; Residential Tower B: 83; Basement: B5
- Floor area: 660,077 m^{2} (7,105,010 sq ft) (Development)
- Lifts/elevators: 43

Design and construction
- Architects: Skidmore Owings & Merrill; Samoo Architects & Engineers
- Structural engineer: (South Korea) POSCO Engineering & Construction

Haeundae LCT The Sharp (Korean: 해운대 엘시티 더샵) is a major urban development project in Jung-dong, Haeundae District, Busan, South Korea. Located in front of Haeundae Beach, it consists of a 411.6 m (1,350 ft), 101-floor supertall landmark tower used as a hotel, and two 85-floor residential skyscrapers. It has an urban entertainment complex at the base housing a shopping mall, a hot spring spa and a water park. The landmark tower houses luxury and residential hotels with a convention center and an observatory on the 100th floor.

The towers are Busan's 2nd-4th supertall skyscrapers after Haeundae Doosan We've the Zenith, 301 m (988 ft) tall. LCT tower is the second-tallest tower in South Korea after the 555 m (1,821 ft) Lotte World Tower in Seoul and is one of the world's top 10 most expensive skyscrapers.

Haeundae LCT The Sharp was completed and opened on November 30, 2019. In 2022, Haeundae LCT The Sharp hosted an exhibition for Proof, the anthology album of the South Korean group BTS, documenting the act's nine-year career. The exhibition was planned by the band's entertainment agency, HYBE, which invited fans to immerse themselves in a visual trail of BTS' history.

On February 20, 2024, Busan police began an investigation in search of two jumpers who leaped with parachutes from the top of the 99th floor observation deck of the Haeundae LCT.

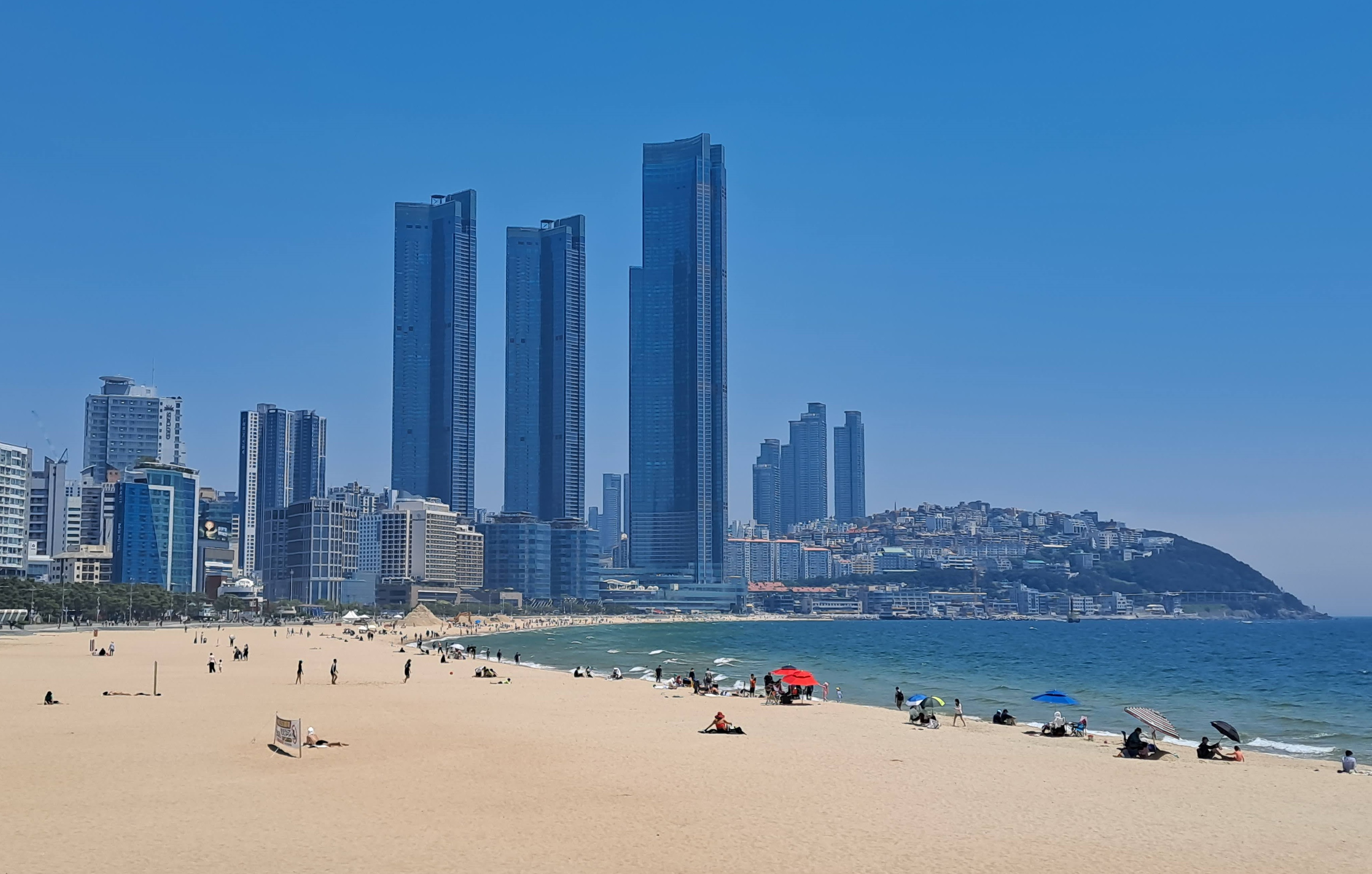
Haeundae Beach and LCT The Sharp in May 2024.

== Gallery ==
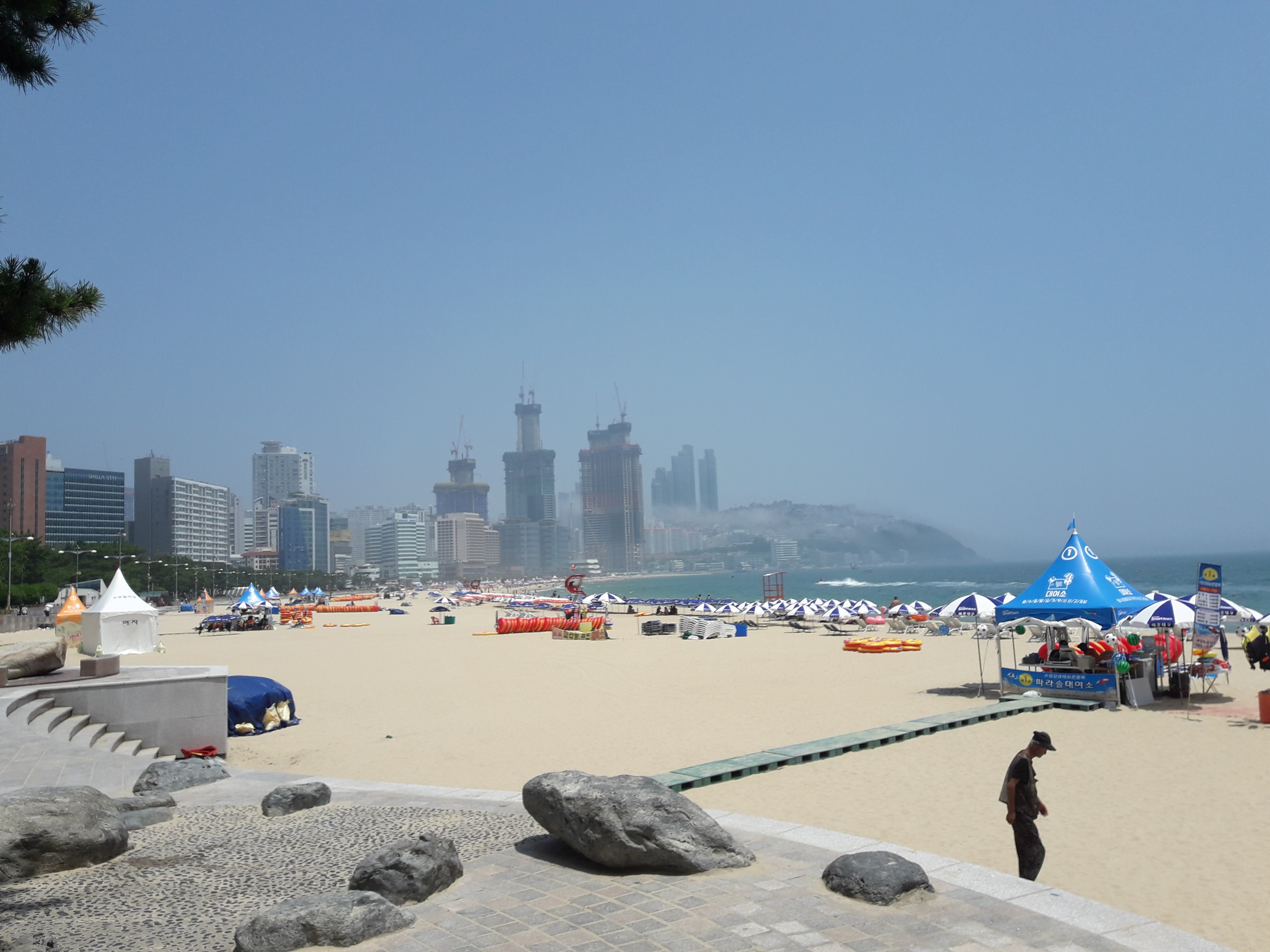
July 2017

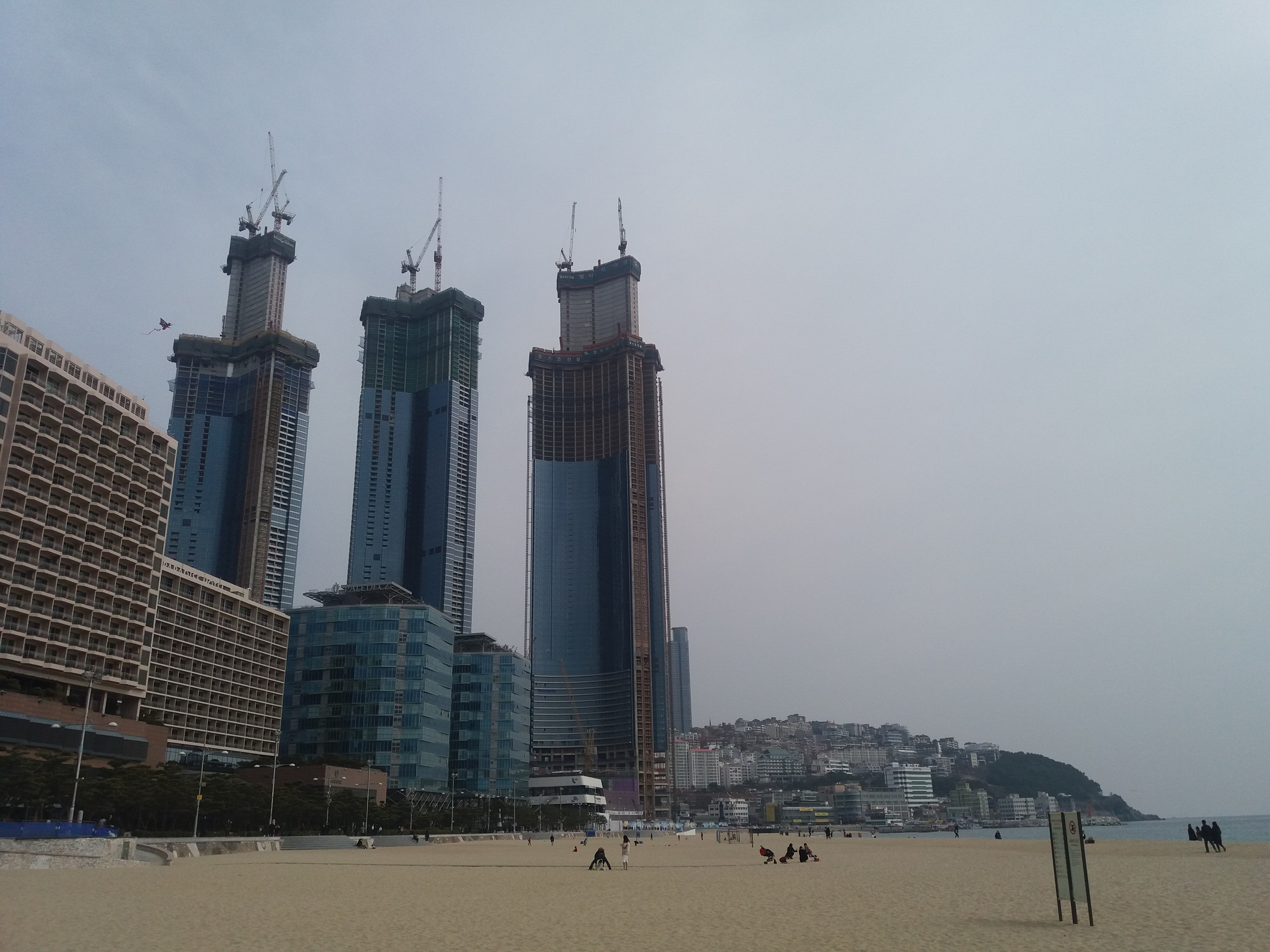
February 2018

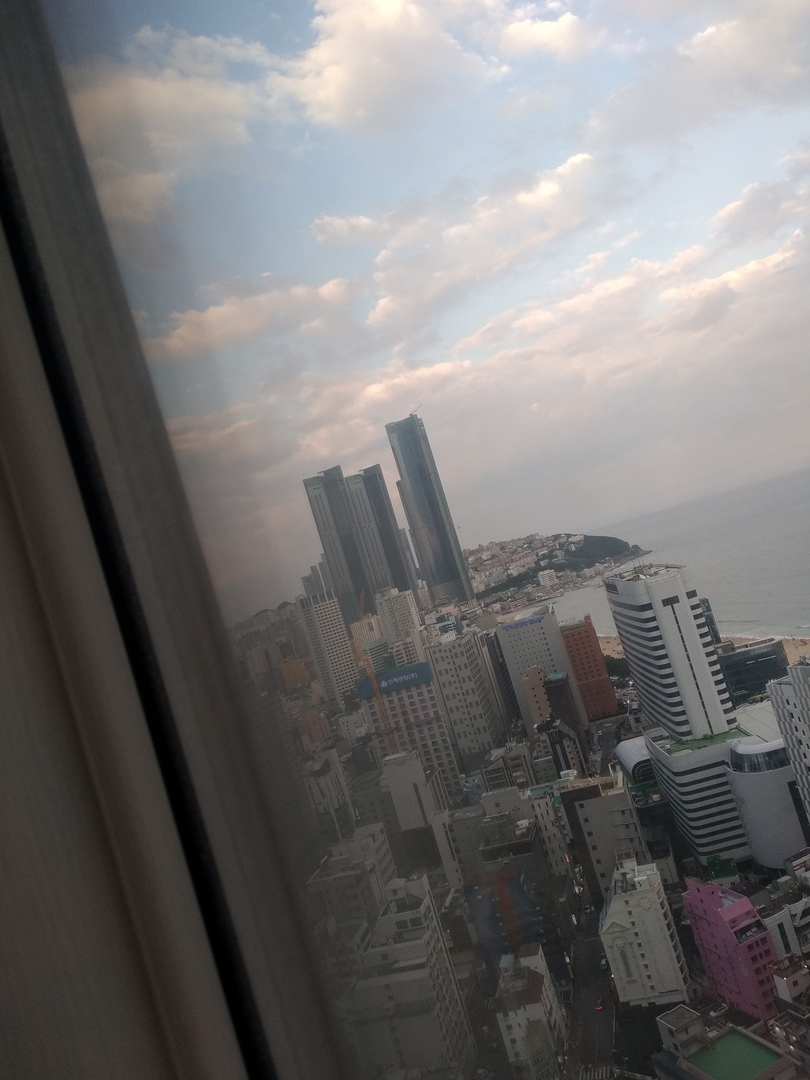
November 2019

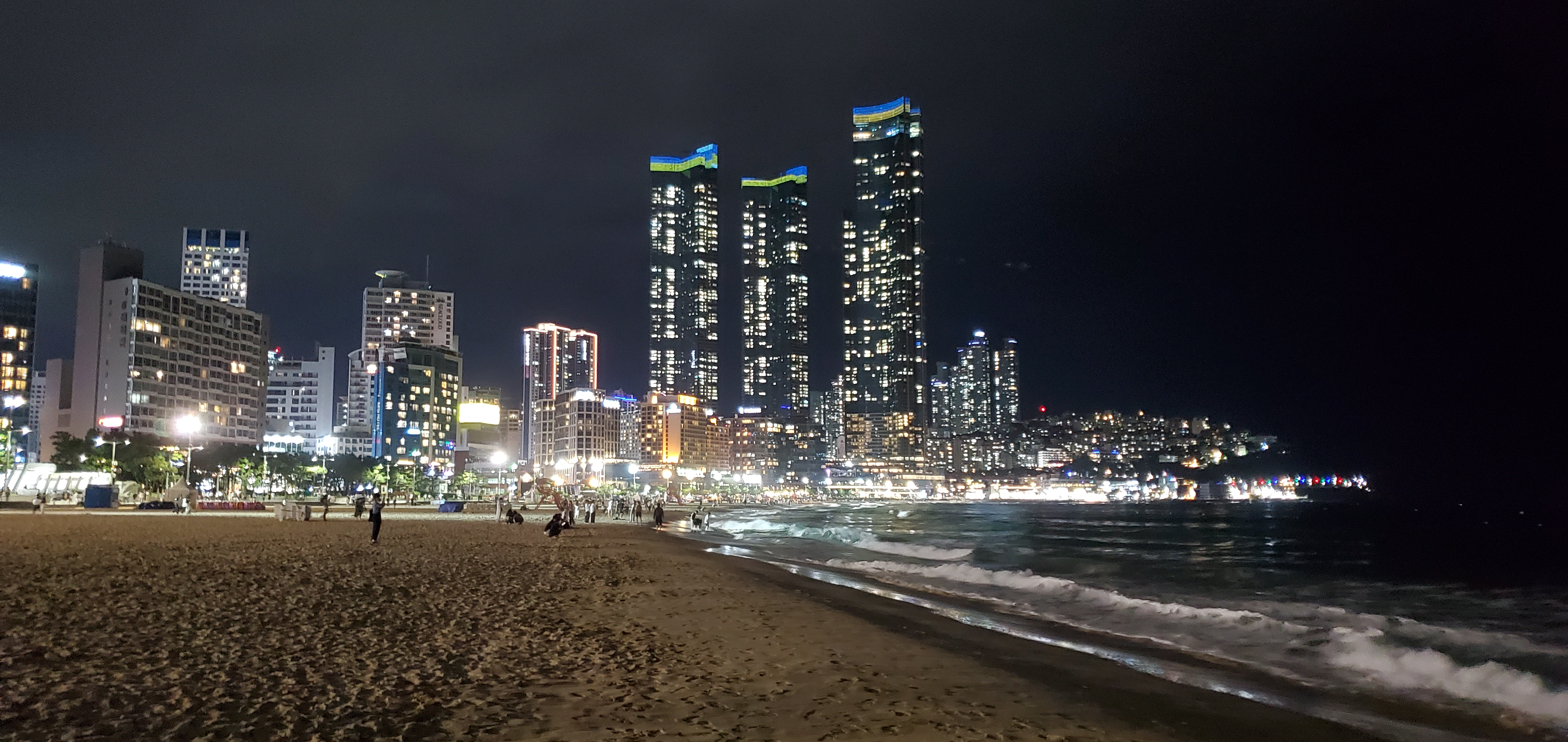
Completed buildings seen from Haeundae Beach, August 2022.

== See also ==
- List of tallest buildings in Busan
- List of tallest buildings in South Korea
