= Thornton Tomasetti =

American scientific and engineering consulting firm

- Type: Private
- Founded: 1949; 77 years ago
- Headquarters: New York City, U.S.
- Number of locations: 40+ offices
- Area served: Worldwide
- Key people: Mike Squarzini (Co-CEO); Peter DiMaggio (Co-CEO); Wayne Stocks President; Gary Panariello Director; Tom Scarangello Executive Chairman
- Number of employees: 2,000+
- Website: www.thorntontomasetti.com

Thornton Tomasetti is an American engineering consulting firm headquartered in New York City, United States. It operates globally and employs over 2,000 people. It was formerly known as the Thornton-Tomasetti Group, Thornton Tomasetti Engineers, Lev Zetlin & Associates, LZA Technology and Weidlinger Associates.

== Services ==
Thornton Tomasetti has expertise in structural engineering, facade engineering, forensic engineering, structural renovations, construction engineering, resilience (engineering and construction), sustainable design, applied science, protective design and security, civil engineering and bridge design and rehabilitation. The firm's services are supported by its internal research and development CORE teams, which provides technology-focused expertise, computational simulation and software development as well as artificial intelligence and machine learning.

The firm provides consulting expertise to clients in a variety of industries, including architecture, engineering, construction, insurance and law firms, real estate developers, building owners and operators, defense, life sciences, manufacturing, natural resources and space systems.

== History ==
1949—Paul Weidlinger opens consultancy: Weidlinger Associates dates back to 1949 with the launch of Paul Weidlinger Consulting Engineers in Washington, D.C. A native of Budapest, Hungary, Paul earned a master's degree from the ETH Zurich in Zurich. He apprenticed with Le Corbusier in Paris and László Moholy-Nagy in London before coming to the United States in the late 1940s.

1950s—Applied Science division launched: Paul Weidlinger, Dr. Mario Salvadori and Dr. Melvin Baron shared an interest in the dynamic response of structures, which led the firm to create an Applied Science division. The group developed analysis and design procedures to protect structures from the effects of blast loadings. Their methods led to early and continuing use of computers in advanced analysis and design.

1956—Lev Zetlin starts Lev Zetlin Associates: After earning a doctoral degree from New York's Cornell University, Lev Zetlin decided to start his own company, Lev Zetlin Associates (LZA).

1960—Charlie Thornton joins LZA: Charlie Thornton, who earned master's and doctoral degrees from New York University and authored a thesis on cable nets, joined Lev Zetlin Associates in 1960. Serving as co-chairman of the firm until 2004, he was involved in the analysis, design and construction of projects worldwide.

1964 -- 1964 New York World's Fair (Flushing Meadows, New York): Early in his career, Lev Zetlin devised a "double-layer bicycle wheel" roof system. The system combines upper and lower cables with varying tensions that are jacked apart and connected by rigid vertical struts. Connecting cables that have differing natural frequencies minimizes wind-induced fluttering. First developed for the Utica Memorial Auditorium, which was completed in 1960, Lev Zetlin's bicycle wheel system has helped to shape the design of other tensile structures, among them the New York State Pavilion, Madison Square Garden, the Seoul Olympic Gymnastics Arena, Tropicana Field, and the Georgia Dome.

1968—Richard Tomasetti joins LZA: Richard Tomasetti joined Lev Zetlin Associates after working in the aerospace and submarine industries. Tomasetti created Environspace Research and Development, the firm's first research and development group.

1977—Charlie Thornton and Richard Tomasetti buy LZA from Gable Industries: Charlie Thornton and Richard Tomasetti purchased Lev Zetlin Associates while it was a subsidiary of Gable Industries. It was at this time that the firm began performing some work as Thornton Tomasetti. The firm's name changed officially from the TTG Group to Thornton Tomasetti in 1999.

1980s-1990s—FLEX code introduced: The FLEX code was first developed by Weidlinger in the early 1980s to support Nuclear Test Ban Treaty monitoring. Its name is derived from its primary focus, performing "fast large explicit" time-domain dynamic simulations, and from its versatility and speed in modeling unusually large structures. In the early 1990s, the FLEX code was diversified into a family: NLFlex (blast), EMFlex (electromagnetic waves), and PZFlex (sonar and ultrasound). In 1999, SpectralFlex was developed to serve the growing field of medical therapeutics, and in 2002, Weidlinger created the FLEX Template System, for modeling and simulation of structural components of civilian structures subjected to bomb blasts.

2001—World Trade Center collapse (New York, New York): In the 10 months after the September 11 attacks, crews removed more than 1.6 million tons of debris. Thornton Tomasetti staff were the first engineers on the site on September 11, and started work that afternoon. The firm supervised 20 member firms of the Structural Engineers Association of New York and arranged for 24/7 coverage of the site for nine months. The firm assisted in rescue, demolition and clean-up, advising on structural issues that required resolution as part of the recovery effort.

2004—Taipei 101 (Taipei, Taiwan) Completed: The first 21st-century building to become the world's tallest upon completion, Taipei 101 is, as its name implies, a 101-story tower. Working with engineer of record Evergreen Consulting, Thornton Tomasetti established an efficient steel-based dual structural system and solved wind behavior problems with distinctive double stair-step corners. By 2020, Thornton Tomasetti had designed five of the 20 tallest complete buildings in the world.

2011 – CORE studio founded: CORE studio is the firm's internal research and development group that specializes in application development, computational modeling and artificial intelligence to create efficiencies in the structural design and construction process.

2012—Response to Hurricane Sandy: On October 29, 2012, Hurricane Sandy made landfall near Atlantic City, New Jersey. In response, the firm conducted damage assessment in three states related to structural and architectural integrity, HVAC, electrical, plumbing and fire protection equipment and systems. Included in the investigations were high-rise office and residential facilities, and other retail, rail, aviation and government facilities.

2015—Thornton Tomasetti and Weidlinger merge: Thornton Tomasetti and Weidlinger Associates announced a merger. Weidlinger Associates was a U.S.-based structural engineering firm that designed and rehabilitated buildings, bridges, and infrastructure and provided special services in applied science, forensics, and physical security. The merger created two new entities: CORE Lab - a sister internal group to CORE studio - that focuses on the long-term development of internal methods, capabilities and products to evaluate new business opportunities; and TTWiiN, a technology accelerator and product commercialization platform.

== Projects ==
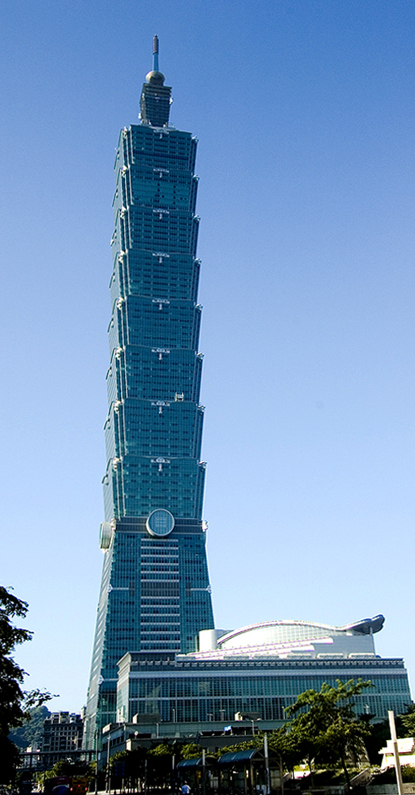
Taipei 101

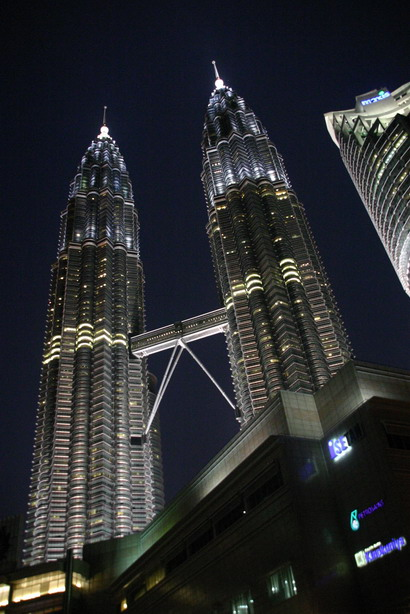
Petronas Towers

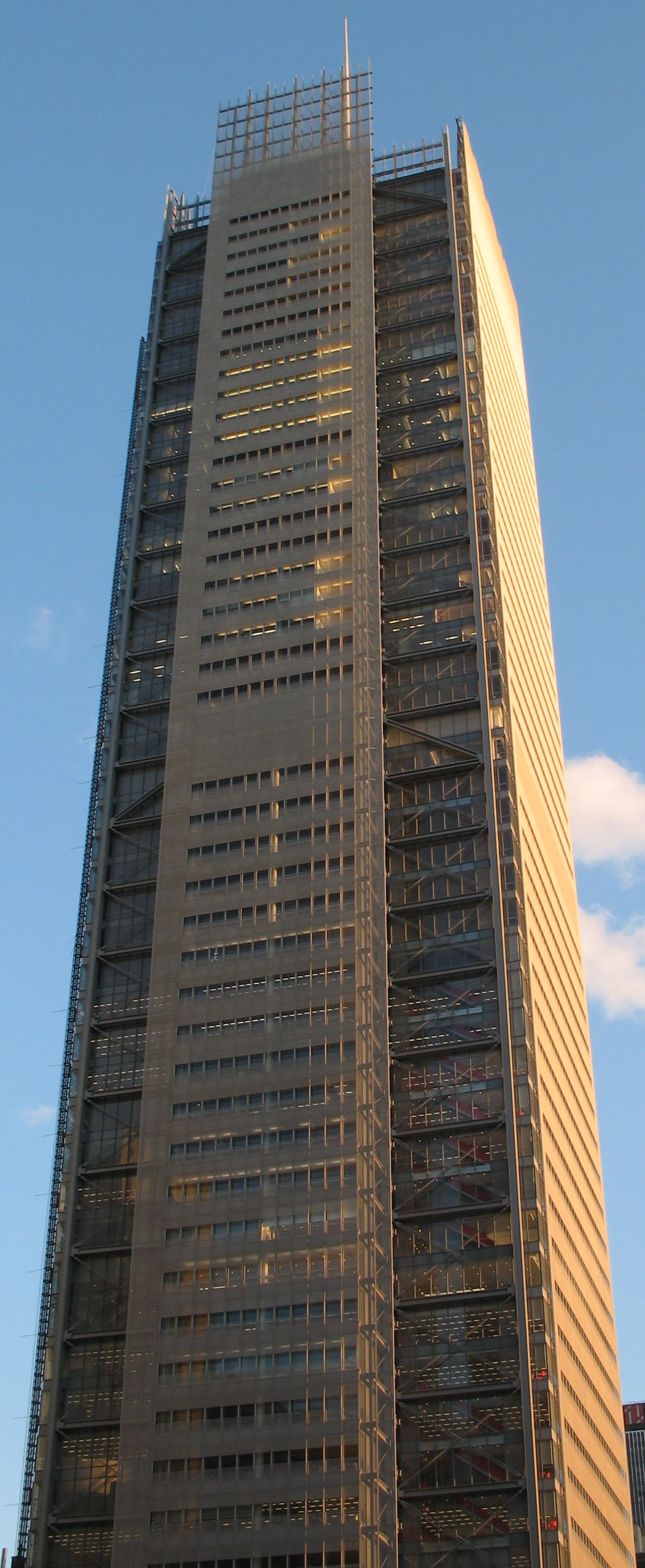
The New York Times Building

=== Skyscrapers, buildings and structures ===
- 1111 South Wabash, Chicago
- 110 North Wacker, Chicago
- 181 West Madison, Chicago
- 191 North Wacker, Chicago
- 30 Hudson Street, Jersey City, New Jersey
- 30 West Oak, Chicago
- 401 East Ontario, Chicago
- 420 Fifth Avenue, New York
- 5 Times Square, New York
- 546 Fifth Avenue, New York
- 55 East Erie, Chicago
- 550 West Jackson, Chicago
- 599 Lexington Avenue, New York
- 717 Texas Avenue, Houston, Texas
- 745 Seventh Avenue, New York
- 840 North Lake Shore Drive, Chicago
- 855 Avenue Of The Americas, New York
- 601 North Central, Phoenix, Arizona
- 20 Grosvenor Square, London
- ABN AMRO Plaza, Chicago
- AMA Building, Chicago
- Americas Tower, New York
- Block A & Block C, MGM CityCenter – "Project CityCenter", Las Vegas, Nevada
- Block 21, Austin, Texas
- Bloomberg Tower, 731 Lexington Avenue, New York
- CBS 2 Broadcast Center, Chicago
- Chase Center, Chicago
- Chifley Tower, Sydney, Australia
- Children's Museum of Los Angeles, Los Angeles
- Citicorp Center, Chicago, Illinois
- City View Tower, Chicago, Illinois
- Conrad Chicago Hotel, Chicago
- Comcast Technology Center, Philadelphia
- Continental Center, New York
- Deep Space Auditorium, Verona, Wisconsin
- Embassy Suites, New York
- Erie on the Park, Chicago
- Eurasia Tower, Moscow
- Federation Tower, Moscow
- Fifty South Sixth, Minneapolis
- Furman Hall, New York
- Great American Tower at Queen City Square, Cincinnati
- Harborside Financial Center Plaza 5 & Plaza 10, Jersey City, New Jersey
- Hilton New Orleans Riverside, New Orleans
- Kingsbury on the Park, Chicago
- Lehman Brothers Building, New York
- Leo Burnett Building, Chicago
- Lotte Center Hanoi, Hanoi, Vietnam
- McMahon Hall of Fordham University, New York
- Menara Maxis, Kuala Lumpur, Malaysia
- Metapolis, Hwaseong, South Korea
- Minneapolis Central Library, Minneapolis
- Miranova Condominiums, Columbus, Ohio
- Modern Art Museum of Fort Worth, Fort Worth, Texas
- New York Times Building, New York
- One Indiana Square, Indianapolis
- One Liberty Place, Philadelphia
- One Mellon Bank Center, Pittsburgh
- One Pennsylvania Plaza, Philadelphia
- Optima Horizons, Evanston, Illinois
- Optima Towers, Evanston, Illinois
- Overture Center, Madison, Wisconsin
- Palazzo Lombardia, Milan, Italy
- Park Alexandria, Chicago
- Petronas Towers, Kuala Lumpur, Malaysia
- Ping An Finance Centre, Shenzhen, China
- Plaza 66, Shanghai, PRC
- Prentice Women's Hospital, Chicago
- R R Donnely Building, Chicago
- Random House World Headquarters, New York
- Shanghai Tower, Shanghai, China
- Taipei 101, Taipei, Taiwan
- Tencent Headquarters, Shenzhen, China
- The Clare at Water Tower, Chicago
- The Edge, Brooklyn, New York
- The Westport, New York
- The Plaza at PPL Center, Allentown, Pennsylvania
- Times Square Tower, New York
- UBS Tower, Chicago, Illinois
- University of Chicago Graduate School of Business Building, Chicago, Illinois
- We've the Zenith, Busan, South Korea
- Westin Hotel at Copley Place, Boston
- Wilshire Grand Tower, Los Angeles
- Winspear Opera House, Dallas
- Wuhan Greenland Center, Wuhan, China

=== Stadiums and convention centers ===
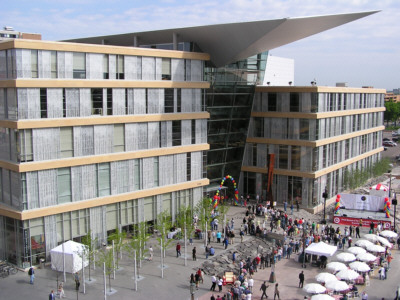
The New Minneapolis Central Library, designed by César Pelli, completed in 2006

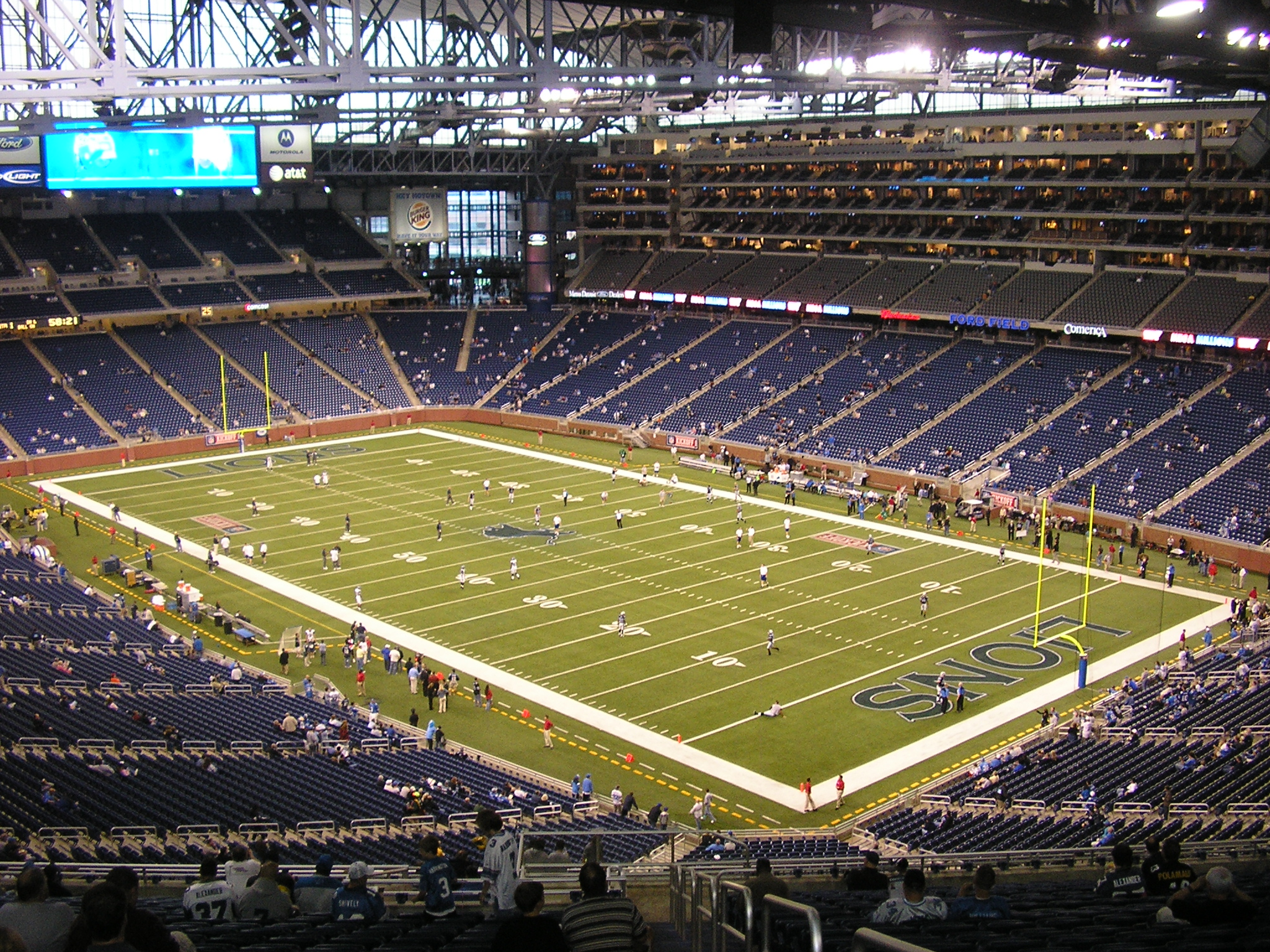
Ford Field

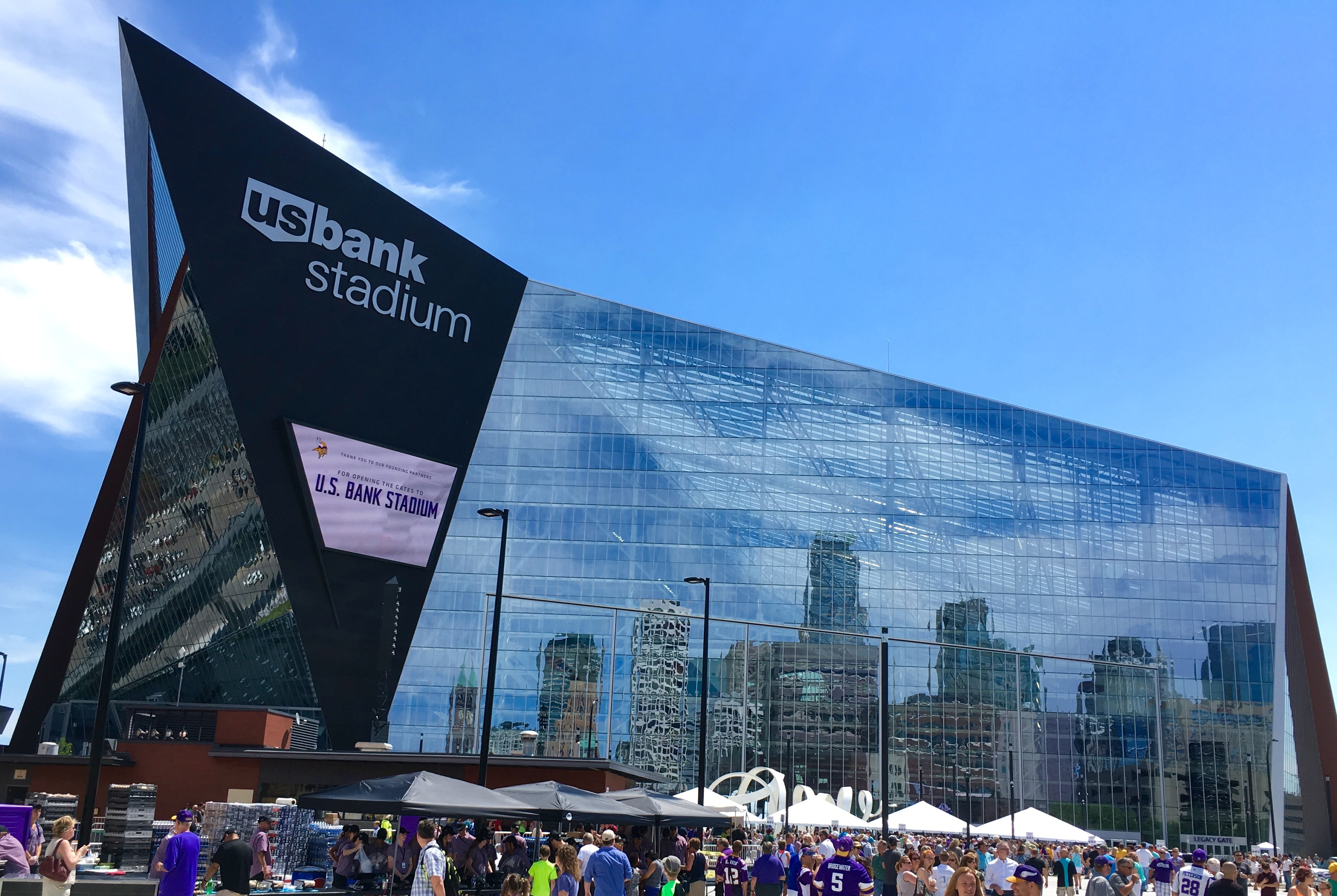
U.S. Bank Stadium

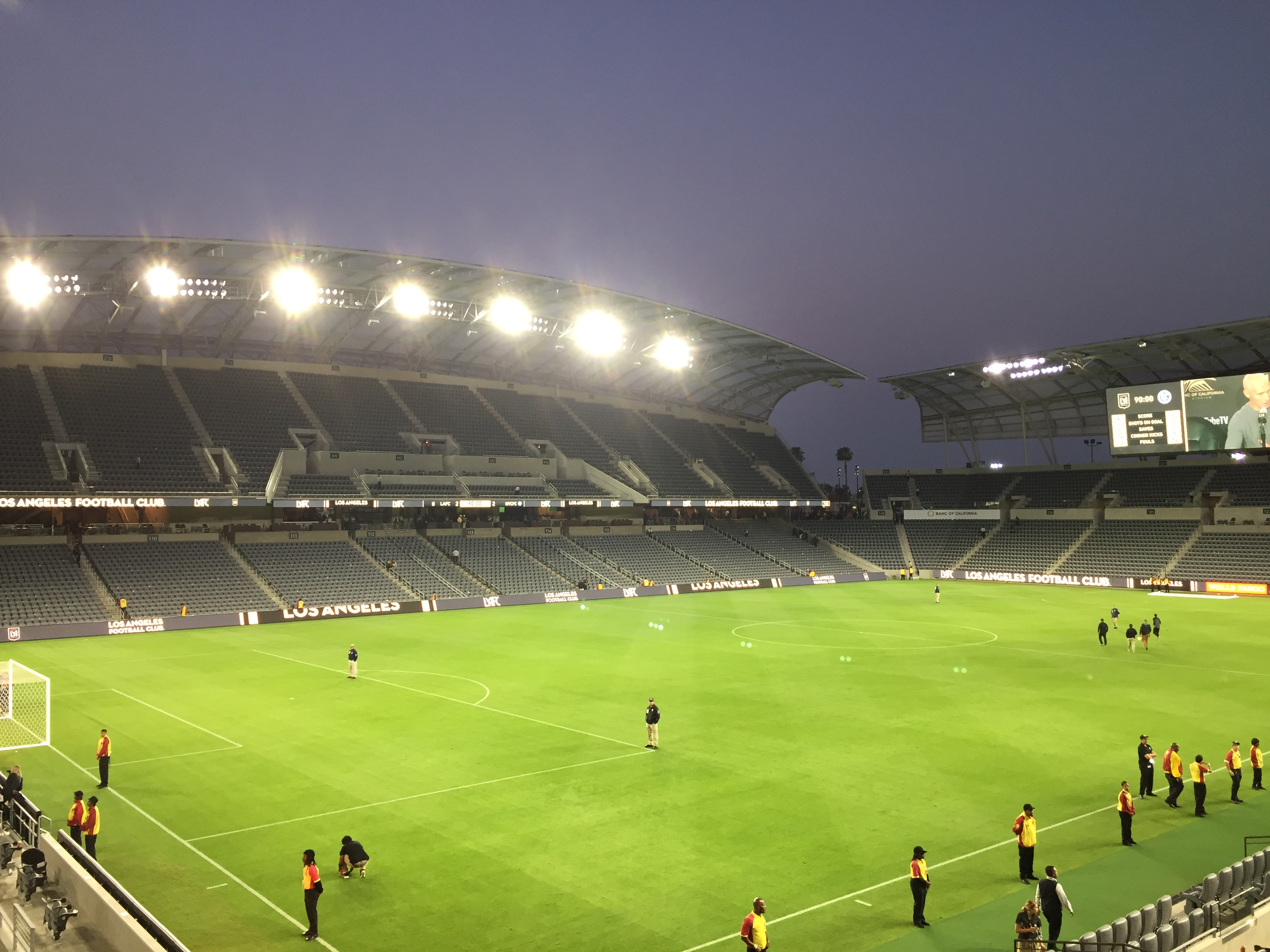
Banc of California Stadium

- American Airlines Arena, Miami
- Arvest Ballpark. Springdale, Arkansas
- Al-Najaf International Stadium, Najaf, Iraq
- AT&T Park, San Francisco
- Baku National Stadium, Baku, Azerbaijan
- Ball Arena, Denver
- Banc of California Stadium, Los Angeles, California
- Barclays Center, Brooklyn, New York
- Basra Sports City, Basra, Iraq
- BMO Field, Toronto, Canada
- BOK Center, Tulsa, Oklahoma
- Bridgestone Arena, Nashville, Tennessee
- Children's Mercy Park, Kansas City, Kansas
- Climate Pledge Arena, Seattle, Washington
- CONSOL Energy Center, Pittsburgh
- Ford Center, Evansville, Indiana
- Ford Field, Detroit, Michigan
- Golden 1 Center, Sacramento, California
- Honda Center, Anaheim, California
- Jeju World Cup Stadium, Seogwipo, South Korea
- Kohl Center, Madison, Wisconsin
- MetLife Stadium, East Rutherford, New Jersey
- Nationals Park, Washington, D.C.
- Nationwide Arena, Columbus, Ohio
- Petco Park, San Diego
- Philips Arena, Atlanta
- PNC Park, Pittsburgh
- Prudential Center, Newark, New Jersey
- Rogers Place, Edmonton, Canada
- Soldier Field, Chicago
- United Center, Chicago
- U.S. Cellular Field, Chicago
- U.S. Bank Stadium, Minneapolis
- Videotron Centre, Quebec City
- Yankee Stadium, New York

=== Renewal and rehabilitation ===
- Chrysler Building – Facade Rehabilitation, New York
- Kaufmann Stadium - Renovation, Jackson County, Missouri
- United States Capitol dome – Structural Rehabilitation, Washington, D.C.
- Washington Monument Renovation, Washington, D.C.
- Winter Garden Reconstruction – Structural Repairs, New York
- Wrigley Field – Structural Rehabilitation & Addition, Chicago

=== Forensics, investigation and property loss consulting ===
- i-35 bridge collapse, Minneapolis, Minnesota
- Indiana State Fair stage collapse
- Miller Park investigation, Milwaukee, Wisconsin
- Response to CAT-90 Sandy, New York, New Jersey and Connecticut
- Tropicana parking garage collapse, Atlantic City, New Jersey
- World Trade Center disaster response, New York
- Arecibo Telescope Collapse, Arecibo, Puerto Rico

=== Under construction ===
- 151 Incheon Tower, Incheon, South Korea
- Baha Mar, The Bahamas
- Comcast Technology Center, Philadelphia
- CPKC Stadium, Kansas City, Missouri
- Diamond of Istanbul, Istanbul, Turkey
- Jeddah Tower, Jeddah, Saudi Arabia
- Moscow International Business Center Lot 13, Moscow
- Museum of the Built Environment, Riyadh, Saudi Arabia
- North Bund Center, Shanghai, China
- One Broadway Plaza, Santa Ana, California
- San Francisco Transbay Terminal, San Francisco
- Signature Tower Jakarta, Jakarta, Indonesia
- SOCAR Tower, Baku, Azerbaijan

== Affiliated organizations ==
- Thornton Tomasetti Foundation - The Thornton Tomasetti Foundation, a tax-exempt, nonprofit organization established in February 2008, is focused on funding fellowships, scholarships and internships for undergraduate students and those planning to pursue graduate studies in building engineering, design or technology. It also provides financial support for individuals and organizations pursuing philanthropic activities related to building engineering, design or technology.
- TTWiiN – TTWiiN, an innovation accelerator, was formed following the merger of Thornton Tomasetti and Weidlinger Associates in 2015. TTWiiN identify technologies and products that have commercial applicability and appeal for a broad audience across many industries.
- ACE Mentorship - Charlie Thornton founded The ACE Mentor Program, which is a not-for-profit organization, formed to enlighten and motivate students toward architecture, construction, engineering, and related careers by providing mentoring opportunities for future designers and constructors.
- AEC Angels – Thornton Tomasetti is a founding member of this venture fund, which covers seed through Series B + investments in the AEC sector.

== Notable alumni ==
- Paul Weidlinger
- Peter DiMaggio
