= DiMaggio =

DiMaggio is an Italian surname. People with this name include:

- Three American-born brothers who all played in Major League Baseball as center fielders:
  - Dom DiMaggio (1917–2009), Boston Red Sox (1940 to 1953)
  - Joe DiMaggio (1914–1999), New York Yankees (1936 to 1951), elected to the Hall of Fame
  - Vince DiMaggio (1912–1986), several teams (1937 to 1946)
- Daniel DiMaggio (born 2003), American actor
- John DiMaggio (born 1968), American voice actor and comedian
- Paul DiMaggio (born 1951), American sociologist
- Peter DiMaggio, American engineer

== See also ==
- 3767 DiMaggio, a main-belt asteroid named for Joe DiMaggio
