= Gangnam Finance Center =

Skyscraper in Seoul, South Korea

- 강남파이낸스센터
- Interactive map of the Gangnam Finance Center area
- Former names: Star Tower

General information
- Status: Completed
- Type: Office
- Location: 152, Teheran-ro, Gangnam-gu, Seoul, South Korea
- Coordinates: 37.5000°N 127.0364°E
- Construction started: 13 May 1995
- Completed: 31 July 2001

Height
- Roof: 204 m (669 feet)

Technical details
- Floor count: 45
- Floor area: 212,615.29 m^{2}
- Lifts/elevators: 31

Design and construction
- Architecture firm: Roche-Dinkeloo
- Main contractor: Hyundai E&C

Other information
- Public transit: Yeoksam

Website
- www.gfckorea.co.kr

Gangnam Finance Center (Korean: 강남파이낸스센터), formerly known as Star Tower or I-Tower, is a 204 metres (669 ft) skyscraper in Seoul, South Korea. It was constructed in the period 1995–2001. It is the 33rd tallest building in South Korea and 9th or 10th tallest (sources vary) building in Seoul. It has 45 surface floors and 8 underground ones.

== Tenants ==
- Avaya 12F
- British American Tobacco Korea 42F-43F
- Chrysler Korea 14F
- Citibank Korea 12F
- Diageo 32F
- Double U Games 16F
- eBay Korea 34F-37F
- DELL TECHNOLOGIES 17F-18F
- Google 22F
- EUKOR Car Carriers 24F
- Heidrick & Struggles 5F
- Hanhwa Securities 12F
- IMM Investment Corp/PE 5F
- KEB 2F
- Newport Legacy Inc. 14F
- Nike Korea L.L.C 30F, 31F, 33F
- NH Investment&Securities 14F
- Partners Group 25F
- Ras Gas 15F
- Rolex Korea 4F
- Samjong Accounting Corp. 8F-11F, 15F, 27~29F
- Kookmin Bank PB 21F
- Korea Investment&Securities 15F
- Samsung Life Insurance 20F
- Samsung Securities 25F
- Seoul National Univ. Hospital 3F,38F-40F
- Shinhan Bank PB 20F
- Samsung F&M Insurance 4F
- Samsung Securities 25F
- Symantec Korea 28F
- 11st sellerzone / SK Planet 4F
- TARGET 8F
- Tencent 6F
- The Executive Centre 41F
- The Walt Disney Company Korea 7F
- UL Korea 26F
