= Haeundae Doosan We've the Zenith =

Building complex in Busan, South Korea

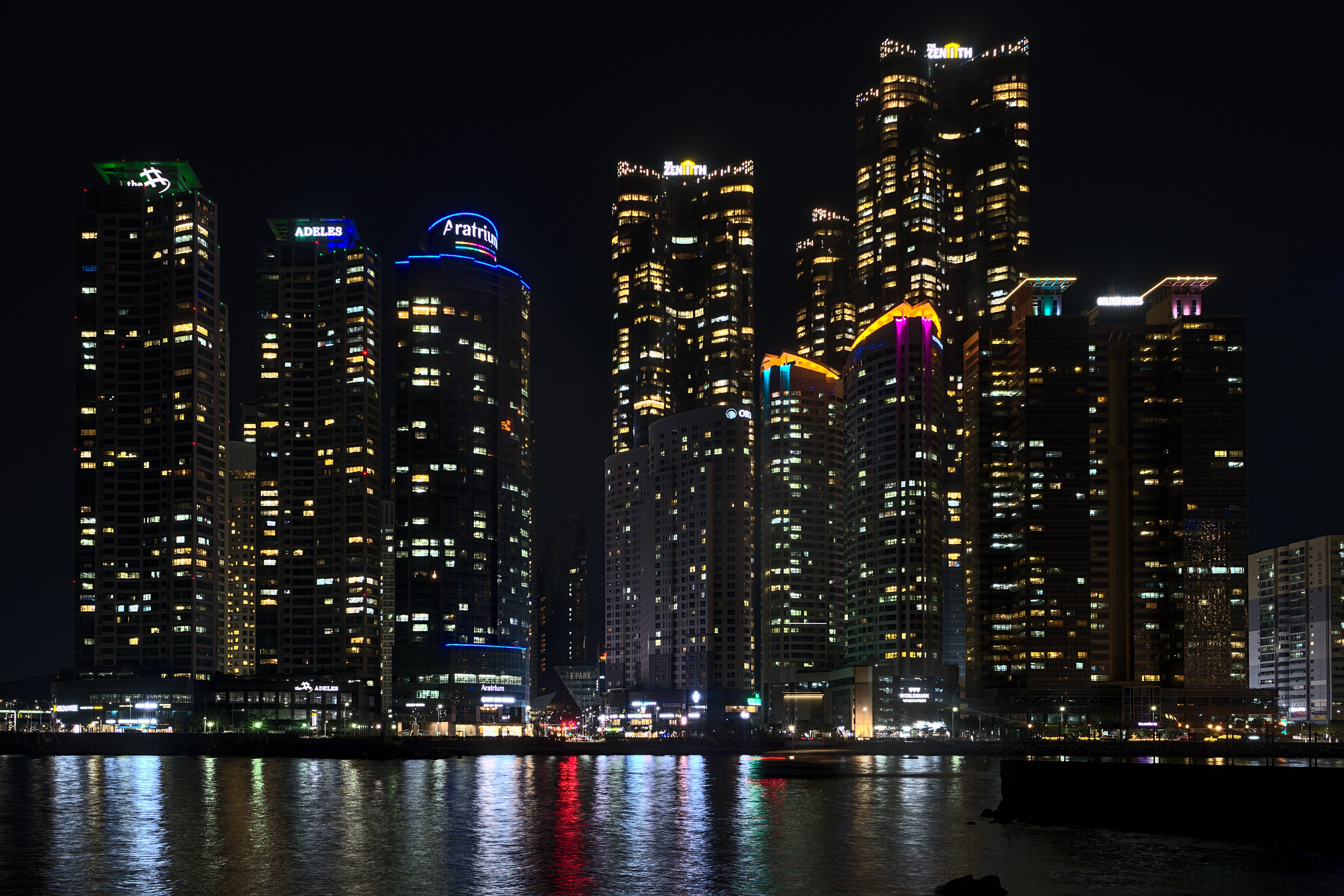
- We've the Zenith Towers in Marine City, Busan
- Interactive map of the Haeundae Doosan We've the Zenith area

General information
- Status: Completed
- Type: Residential
- Location: U-dong, Haeundae-gu, Busan, South Korea
- Coordinates: 35°09′24.09″N 129°08′41.99″E
- Construction started: November 22, 2007
- Completed: November 5, 2011
- Opening: December 12, 2011

Height
- Architectural: Tower A: 300 m (984 ft); Tower B: 281.5 m (924 ft); Tower C: 265 m (869 ft)

Technical details
- Floor count: Tower A: 80; Tower B: 75; Tower C: 70; Underground: B5
- Floor area: Tower A: 128,595 m^{2} (1,384,185 sq ft); Tower B: 120,136 m^{2} (1,293,133 sq ft)

Design and construction
- Architect: DeStefano + Partners
- Developer: Daewon Plus Construction
- Structural engineer: Thornton Tomasetti
- Main contractor: Doosan Engineering & Construction

Website
- www.doosanenc.com/en

Haeundae Doosan We've the Zenith is a complex of three residential towers in the Haeundae District of Busan, South Korea, which was completed in 2011. With 80 floors and a height of 300 m, as of 2026, Tower A is the 37th-tallest residential building in the world, and is the seventh tallest building in South Korea.

The Haeundae Doosan We've the Zenith consists of three residential buildings, with 70, 75 and 80 stories respectively, comprising 1,788 households in total, and one office building on its 42,500 square metres (457,000 sq ft) site. The total construction work took 48 months from November 2007 to November 2011.

== Architecture and design ==
The curves from the waves of the Haeundae beach, and Mt. Jang contribute to the design of the complex, and it is inspired by the shape of flower petals as well. The curved shape of the exterior allows residents views of Haeundae beach, Nurimaru and Gwangan Bridge.

De Stefano & Partners, a specialist design firm in a field of high rise architecture, is credited for the architecture of Doosan We've the Zenith; Jerde Partnership International designed the commercial building; and the SWA Group, which conducted the landscaping of the U.S. Disney World, carried out landscaping work of Haeundae Doosan We've the Zenith.

The buildings received a Korea Good Design award in 2011.

== Structure and safety ==
A structural health monitoring (SHM) system equipped with sensors that check wind load and earthquake load to the building in real time has been applied to Haeundae Doosan We've the Zenith. The structural design was carried out by U.S. Thornton Tomasetti, a firm that also designed Taipei 101—a high-rise building in Taiwan.

The Haeundae Doosan We've the Zenith has a refuge area every three floors, which can be utilized as a resting area or a hanging garden under normal circumstances and is used as a refuge space in the event of emergency. To prevent spalling, which is the explosion that can occur when the concrete is exposed to high temperatures, the buildings were built with high strength concrete using a spalling failure prevention method. This technology was recognized with a New Construction Technology Certification from the Ministry of Land, Transport and Maritime Affairs in September 2008.

== Facilities ==
The complex houses a number of facilities for residents, including a wine club, soundproof music practice room, family cinema, hobby rooms and reading rooms. Also Haeundae Doosan We’ve the Zenith has its own condominium that can be used as a guest house for residents and a ballroom for parties, seminars and other events.

== See also ==
- List of tallest buildings in Busan
- List of tallest buildings in South Korea
- List of tallest residential buildings
- Korean architecture
- Doosan Group
- Thornton Tomasetti
