= Lotte World Mall =

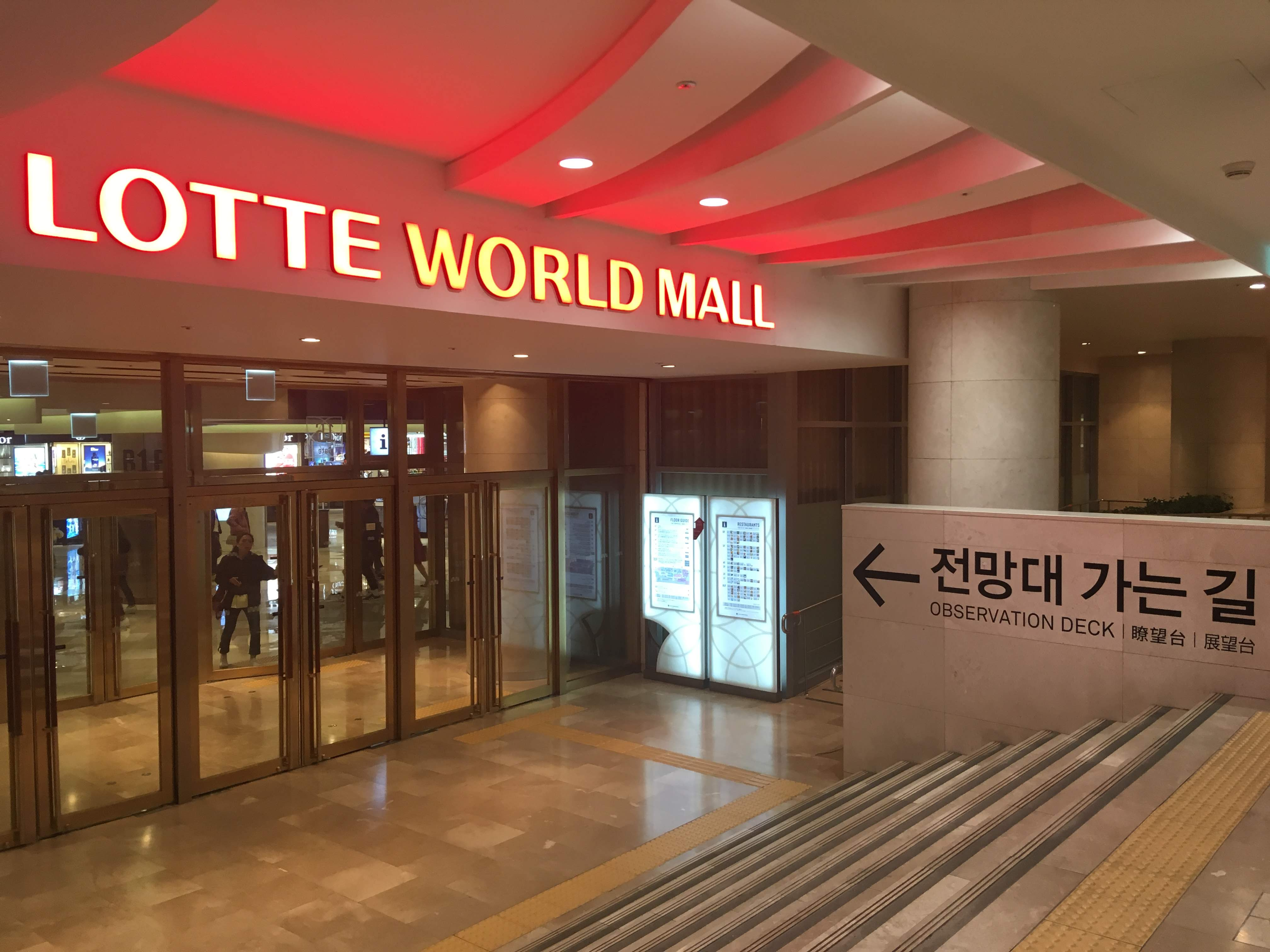
- Entrance to Lotte World Mall
- Location: Seoul, South Korea
- Coordinates: 37°30′47″N 127°06′12″E
- Opened: October 14, 2014; 12 years ago
- Owner: Lotte Group
- Floors: Tower: 123 above ground, 6 below Mall: 11 above ground, 6 below Avenue L: 8 above ground, 4 below
- Website: lwt.co.kr

Night view from ground level

Lotte World Mall (Korean: 롯데월드몰) is a shopping complex in the Songpa District of Seoul, South Korea. First opened on October 14, 2014, it includes the Lotte World Tower, the Lotte World Mall building, and the Avenue L building. The Lotte World Mall's site comprises 26,000 square meters, with a total floor area of 244,000 square meters. The Lotte World Mall building and Lotte World Tower are connected by an underground plaza.

== History ==
In 1987, the Lotte Group envisioned the second Lotte World which would take the form of a skyscraper right next to the Lotte World site. In December 1994, the second Lotte World project was announced, at the time planned to be a 450-meter-tall (1,480 ft) skyscraper with 108 floors. Although construction was planned to commence sometime in the late 1990s, the project was delayed due to the 1997 Asian financial crisis and visibility problems at the runway of the Seongnam Seoul Airport. In 2002, the plan for the Lotte World Tower was increased from its original 108 floors to 123 floors (555m). In 2006, the tower was given the name "Lotte Super Tower" at its groundbreaking ceremony. In 2009, construction of the tower began, with Seoul Airport changing the angle of one of its runways by three degrees to make room for it. In the May of that year, the construction of the second Lotte World Complex began, officially named "Lotte World Mall" in October 2013. During the mall's construction, several incidents occurred, including the death of a construction worker due to the bursting of a high-pressure cap and the injury of a passerby due to a glass railing fixture falling from the third floor. In May 2014, the Lotte World Mall was scheduled to be open temporarily, but the plan was delayed.

The Lotte World Mall was finally opened in October 2014, with Avenue L, Lotte Mart, and Hi-Mart opening on October 14 and Lotte Cinema, Lotte Duty-Free Shop, and Lotte World Aquarium opening on October 15. In December, the Lotte World Mall's cinema and aquarium were closed due to screen vibrations and a tank leak, respectively. Both reopened after five months with the approval of the Seoul Metropolitan Government. A workplace accident delayed the construction of the Lotte World Mall's concert hall, which eventually opened on August 18, 2016. On December 22, 2016, construction of the Lotte World Tower finished, with a ceremony being held to commemorate the occasion. The Lotte World Tower officially opened on April 3, 2017.

== Shops and services ==
The Lotte World Mall Complex contains several buildings, including the Lotte World Tower, Avenue L, and the Lotte World Mall. The Lotte World Tower contains retail components, offices, a seven-star luxury hotel, and an officetel. The Avenue L building contains an Avenue L department store and a Lotte Duty Free Shop. The Lotte World Mall contains Lotte Mart, Hi-Mart, Lotte World Aquarium, Lotte Cinema, and Lotte Concert Hall. Lotte Mart is a hypermarket, while Lotte Hi-Mart is a home appliance and electronics store.

Lotte World Aquarium is the longest Public aquarium in South Korea, containing thirteen "theme zones" meant to represent different ecosystems. The aquarium is home to over fifty-five thousand marine animals from 650 different species, ranging from freshwater fish to beluga whales. The total volume of tanks in the aquarium is 5,200,000 litres (1,374,000 US gal) and there is an 85 metres (279 ft) tunnel tank inside the aquarium. Two of the aquarium's captive beluga whales, Bellu and Belli, died in 2016 and 2019, respectively. A third beluga whale named Bella was captured from the wild in 2013. Following criticism from animal rights advocates, Lotte World Mall committed to transferring Bella to an overseas sanctuary in 2019. As of December 2023, the aquarium continues to exhibit the cetacean.

Lotte Cinema is the largest cinema in Asia, with its 21st Supreplex G screen holding the record for the largest screen size with a width of 34.6 metres (114 ft) and a height of 26.8 metres (88 ft). Lotte Concert Hall is a 2,036-seat classical performance hall.
