= Doosan Engineering & Construction =

South Korean construction company

Doosan Engineering & Construction Co., Ltd.
- Native name: 두산건설 주식회사
- Type: Public
- Traded as: KRX: 011160
- Industry: Construction
- Founded: April 7, 1976; 50 years ago
- Headquarters: 726 Eonju-ro, Gangnam-gu, Seoul, South Korea
- Area served: Worldwide
- Key people: Lee Jeong-hwan (CEO)
- Services: Civil engineering; Construction
- Website: Official website

Doosan Engineering & Construction (Korean: 두산건설) is a South Korean general construction company. Since its inception in 1960, the company has engaged in the construction of infrastructure facilities, including roads, railroads, bridges, ports, buildings and residential facilities.

== History ==
In 2006, Doosan Engineering & Construction acquires Mitsui Babcock Energy, the United Kingdom based boiler design and engineering company, for $169.5 million US dollars.

In 2019, Doosan Engineering and Construction is announced to be delisted from the stock market after becoming an affiliate of Doosan Heavy Industries & Construction.

On June 15, 2020, Doosan Engineering and Construction looks to separate from the Doosan Group as it tries to find a buyer. Doosan E&C reported it is spinning off some assets and liabilities to Valuegrowth Corporation and will own 69.5% of Valuegrowth's common stock.

== Major activities ==
=== Civil works ===
The Company handles design, implementation, maintenance and repair for all types of civil engineering, including expressways, subways, roads, bridges, industrial and residential complex construction, reclamation, and port construction.

=== Plant ===
The company has track records throughout diverse fields of the plant engineering business, including energy, industrial and environmental plants. It has constructed facilities such as low-temperature liquefied gas storage tanks and gas processing plants not only in Korea but also in many parts of the world, most recently the Madagascar ammonia terminal project.

== Brand ==
Doosan We’ve, Doosan Engineering & Construction's residential apartment brand, was created in 2001.

== Business areas ==
- Civil Works
  - Road/Highways
  - Railways/Subways
  - Bridges/Tunnels
  - Ports/Reclaim/Water Works and Sewerage
  - Privately Funded SOC Business
- Architecture
  - Work Facilities
  - Training/R&D/Production Facilities
  - Cultural/Meeting/Physical Fitness Facilities
  - Leisure/Hotel/Commercial Facilities
  - Public/Medical Facilities
  - Electrical Works
  - Remodeling
- Housing
  - Rebuilding
  - Redevelopment
  - In-house Development
  - Housing Developments
  - Contracted Projects
- Plant
  - Environmental Plant
  - Hydrocarbon/Energy Plant
  - Industrial Plant
- CPE (Chemical Process Equipment)
  - Tower/Column
  - Reactor
  - Heat Exchanger
  - Pressure Vessel
  - Miscellaneous
- Steel Bridge
  - general bridges
  - suspension bridges
  - truss bridges
  - cable-stayed bridges
