= Peter DiMaggio =

American engineer and soccer player

- Education: Columbia University (BS, MS)
- Occupation: Engineer
- Known for: Co-CEO of Thornton Tomasetti

Peter DiMaggio is an American civil engineer and expert on the design of blast-resistant buildings. He was the lead engineer for construction of the U.S. embassies in Moscow, Berlin and Baghdad. He is currently the co-CEO of engineering firm Thornton Tomasetti.

== Education ==
DiMaggio attended Columbia University where he studied engineering and played on the men's soccer team. He graduated in 1992 with a bachelor's degree in civil engineering and later earned a master's degree in structural engineering from Columbia. He had an outstanding collegiate soccer career, being named a 1990 second-team All-American and the 1991 Ivy League Player of the Year as well as first-team All-American. He is of Italian ancestry.

== Career ==
In 1994, DiMaggio was hired by Weidlinger, an engineering company based out of New York City. Since then he has steadily established himself as an expert in designing blast-resistant buildings and structures.

He was the lead engineer for the construction of the U.S. embassies in Moscow, Berlin and Baghdad as well as Valeo's technical center in Michigan and the Claremont Tower in New Jersey. In January 2006, DiMaggio was named a principal in Weidlinger. In addition to his work with Weidlinger, DiMaggio also sits on the board of directors of the Structural Engineers Association of New York and is co-chairman of their Codes and Standards committee.
