= Suseong SK Leader's View =

Coordinates: 35°50′19.28″N 128°37′23.10″E

Suseong SK Leader's View (Korean: 수성SK리더스뷰) is a luxury apartment complex in Daegu, South Korea, of which the two tallest twin-skyscrapers are 57-floors, 225 m (738 ft) tall. Ground was broken in 2007 and the skyscrapers were topped-out in 2009, with completion in 2010.
