= Lotte World Tower =

Supertall skyscraper in Seoul, South Korea

Lotte World Tower 롯데월드타워

- The tower in 2022
- Interactive map of the Lotte World Tower 롯데월드타워 area
- Former names: Two Lotte World Tower; Lotte World Premium Tower
- Alternative names: Lotte Jamsil Super Tower

Record height
- Tallest in the OECD countries since 2017^{[I]}
- Preceded by: One World Trade Center

General information
- Status: Completed
- Type: Observation, office, hotel, residential, retail
- Location: (Sincheon-dong) 300 Olympic-ro, Songpa-gu, Seoul, South Korea, South Korea
- Coordinates: 37°30′45″N 127°06′10″E
- Groundbreaking: May 2009
- Construction started: January 22, 2010
- Completed: December 22, 2016
- Opening: April 3, 2017; 9 years ago

Height
- Architectural: 555 m (1,821 ft)
- Top floor: 486 m (1,594 ft)

Technical details
- Floor count: 123 and 6 below ground
- Floor area: 304,081 m^{2} (3,273,100 sq ft)
- Lifts/elevators: 61

Design and construction
- Architect: Kohn Pedersen Fox
- Developer: Lotte Engineering & Construction
- Engineer: Syska Hennessy Group (MEP)
- Structural engineer: Leslie E. Robertson Associates

Other information
- Public transit: Jamsil Station: Line 2, Line 8

Website
- lwt.co.kr

Lotte World Tower (Korean: 롯데월드타워; RR: lotdewoldeutawo) is a 123-story, 555 metres (1,821 ft) supertall skyscraper, located in Sincheon-dong, Songpa District, Seoul, South Korea. It is the sixth-tallest building in the world, the tallest in OECD countries and in South Korea, and also the first in South Korea to be over 100 stories tall. It was the fifth-tallest in the world when completed. The tower opened to the public on April 3, 2017.

A "Sky Bridge Tour" is located on the roof of Lotte World Tower at 541 m (1,775 ft), which is about the same height of One World Trade Center in New York City (1,776 feet or 541 meters), the tallest building in the United States.

== History ==
After 13 years of planning and site preparation, the tower gained final approval to start construction by the government in November 2010 and the first groundbreaking activities of piling and frame assembly were observed at the construction site in March 2012.

On December 31, 2015, the LED-pixels of the façade displayed the number "2016".

On April 3, 2017, Lotte shot off fireworks to celebrate the tower's official opening.

Fireworks display of the Lotte World Tower's grand opening

On January 1, 2018, Lotte shot off fireworks with a LED laser show for seven minutes to celebrate New Year's Day and the 2018 PyeongChang Winter Olympics.

== Design ==
On March 17, 2016, before the final phase of external construction, the diagrid lantern-shaped roof structure was completed. The roof structure was constructed with steel counterparts that are each 12 m (39 ft) and weigh 20 tonnes (20 long tons; 22 short tons). The counterparts were made up of bent metal panels that are 6 centimetres (2.4 in) thick. The roof structure itself is 120 m (390 ft) high and covers floors 107–123. Approximately 3,000 tonnes (3,000 long tons; 3,300 short tons) of steel parts, a high-precision 64-tonne (63-long-ton; 71-short-ton) tower crane, and GPS alignment systems, as well as welding technicians, were used in the construction of the roof.

The roof structure is engineered to withstand its weight without reinforcing pillars, endure earthquakes up to a magnitude of 9 under the Richter magnitude scale, and winds up to 80 m/s (260 ft/s).

The exterior of pale-coloured glass draws inspiration from Korean ceramics and features accents of metal filigree.

The tower incorporates several environmental sustainability features, including an advanced heat pump system for heating and cooling, which utilizes 720 geothermal probes installed about 200 meters underground as well as water from the Han River. Additional technologies include heat-insulating glass with passive shading systems, photovoltaic panels, wind turbines, and rainwater harvesting.

== Floor plans ==
External videos
- https://youtube.com/watch?v=Ru1XEFllhtE The elevators in Lotte World Tower

Seoul Sky occupies the top seven levels. Floors 117–118 are the entrance and view floor, including a glass floor and sky show on 118. Sky Friends Cafe and the sky terrace are located on floors 119–120. Seoul Sky Cafe and a souvenir shop are on floors 121–122, and the premium lounge bar, 123 lounge, is on the top floor at 499 m (1,637 ft).

The observatory charges an admission for entry. The skylight of Seoul Sky was the highest glass floor observatory as of the tower's completion. The tower and One World Trade Center have concluded an operation and technical service agreement. The operating hours of the observatory are divided into two periods. From Sunday to Thursday, it is open from 10:30 AM to 10:00 PM. On Fridays, Saturdays, and public holidays, it is open from 10:30 AM to 11:00 PM.

The space from the 42nd to the 101st floor is used as Signiel, the tallest hotel and residence in South Korea, and it has also been home to various celebrities, including Shin Kyuk-ho, the chairman of the Lotte Corporation.

Floor	Use
125	Mechanical & Rooftop
124	Mechanical
123	Premium Lounge Bar (123 Lounge)
122	Seoul Sky Cafe, Angel in Us Cafe
121	Observation (Seoul Sky) exit, Seoul Sky Shop
120	Observation (Seoul Sky) exit, Sky Terrace
119	Observation (Seoul Sky), Character Dessert Cafe (Sky Friends Cafe)
118	Observation (Seoul Sky) entrance, Sky Deck
117	Observation (Seoul Sky) entrance
116	Mechanical floor
115	Mechanical floor
114	Private office (Premier 7)
113	Private office (Premier 7)
112	Private office (Premier 7)
111	Private office (Premier 7)
110	Private office (Premier 7)
109	Private office (Premier 7)
108	Private office (Premier 7)
107	Private office (Premier 7) Lobby, Signiel Club (member restaurant)
106	Mechanical
105	Mechanical
104	Mechanical
103	Mechanical
102	Refuge Area
101	Signiel Seoul Hotel Guestrooms
100	Signiel Seoul Hotel Guestrooms
99	Signiel Seoul Hotel Guestrooms
98	Signiel Seoul Hotel Guestrooms
97	Signiel Seoul Hotel Guestrooms
96	Signiel Seoul Hotel Guestrooms
95	Signiel Seoul Hotel Guestrooms
94	Signiel Seoul Hotel Guestrooms
93	Signiel Seoul Hotel Guestrooms
92	Signiel Seoul Hotel Guestrooms
91	Signiel Seoul Hotel Guestrooms
90	Signiel Seoul Hotel Guestrooms
89	Signiel Seoul Hotel Guestrooms
88	Signiel Seoul Hotel Guestrooms
87	Signiel Seoul Hotel Guestrooms
86	Hotel Spa & Hotel Facilities
85	Indoor pool, fitness centre, sauna.
84	Mechanical floor
83	Refuge area
82	Bicena Korean restaurant
81	Stay French restaurant, Bicena Korean restaurant
80	Signiel Seoul Hotel lobby
79	Signiel Seoul Hotel Lobby
78	Signiel Seoul Hotel Ballroom
77	Signiel Seoul Hotel Ballroom
76	Signiel Seoul Hotel Ballroom
75	Mechanical
74	Mechanical
73	Mechanical
72	Mechanical
71	Signiel Residences
70	Signiel Residences
69	Signiel Residences
68	Signiel Residences
67	Signiel Residences
66	Signiel Residences
65	Signiel Residences
64	Signiel Residences
63	Signiel Residences
62	Signiel Residences
61	Signiel Residences
60	Refuge area
59	Mechanical floor
58	Signiel Residences
57	Signiel Residences
56	Signiel Residences
55	Signiel Residences
54	Signiel Residences
53	Signiel Residences
52	Signiel Residences
51	Signiel Residences
50	Signiel Residences
49	Signiel Residences
48	Signiel Residences
47	Signiel Residences
46	Signiel Residences
45	Signiel Residences
44	Signiel Residences
43	Signiel Residences Lobby, Fitness Centre, Indoor Golf, Ballroom.
42	Signiel Residences Lobby, Fitness Centre, Indoor Golf, Ballroom.
41	Mechanical floor
40	Refuge area
39	Mechanical floor
38	Office
37	Office
36	Office
35	Office
34	Office
33	Office
32	Office
31	Seoul Sky 31 Food Court, Seoul Sky 31 Convencion Centre.
30	Office
29	Office
28	Office
27	Office
26	Office
25	Office
24	Office
23	Mechanical floor
22	Refuge area
21	Mechanical floor
20	Office
19	Office
18	Office
17	Office
16	Office
15	Office
14	Office
13	Mechanical floor
12	Lotte Financial Centre, Hana Financial Investment, KEB Hana Bank, Woori Bank, Lotte World Tower Banking Centre.
11	BGN Eyeclinic
10	Lotte World Medical Centre
9	Lotte Duty Free Shop
8	Lotte Duty Free Shop
7	Lotte Museum of Art
6	Fitness platform (Move 360)
5	Lotte World Tower publicity center, Public relation office, Press room.
4	Mechanical floor, store room, staff restricted area.
3	Mechanical floor, store room, staff restricted area.
2	Lotte World Office Lobby, Lotte World Management.
1	Signiel Hotel lobby, Signiel Residence Lobby.
B1	Observation (Seoul Sky) Gallery, Lotte World Tower Emergency operation center, Drop-off, Seoul Sky shop, Signature Pharmacy
B2	Observation (Seoul Sky) Entrance, Parking Lot, Loading Bay, Service Office.
B3	Lotte World Parking
B4	Lotte World Parking
B5	Lotte World Parking
B6	Mechanical floor & Loading Bay.

== Incidents and accidents ==
=== Safety issues ===
In 2013 and 2014, three construction workers died during the construction of the tower, and an executive director of Lotte's construction arm was given a suspended sentence of eight months in prison in 2016 for his role in neglecting safety measures at the site. In December 2014, the government of Seoul ordered the mall and cinema complex at the base of the tower, which opened before completion of the tower, to be closed for five months after water was found leaking from an internal aquarium. Independent engineers who assessed the building found that the issues bore little relation to the overall structural integrity of the building and the mall and cinema complex reopened in 2015.

=== Illegal entries and climbing ===
In 2016, two men from Ukraine illegally climbed the under-construction Lotte World Tower via its stairs, and one of them free solo climbed up the crane to the top. Lotte World Tower had advance knowledge of their interest in climbing the tower and their entering the country, and responded by posting approximately 400 security agents around the construction site. Posters with the photos of the two stating they were banned from the building were plastered around the construction site.

On June 12, 2023, a 24-year-old British man illegally climbed the tower without ropes from the ground. The building security discovered him on the 42nd floor at 192 m (630 ft) above ground at 7:50 am. While he was taking a break on the 72nd floor, the police stopped him on the 73rd floor at 313 m (1,027 ft) above ground by using a building maintenance unit at 8:47 am. After his arrest, he said that he had planned the climb for six months.

== Culture ==
=== Cherry Blossom Festival ===
Even when Lotte World Tower was under construction, there were many people who celebrated the cherry blossom festival from April 10 to 12, 2015, and it is still possible to celebrate after its completion. In 2017, the Seokchon Lake cherry blossom festival was held from April 1 to 9. It was held at Seokchon Lake waterfront stages (East and West Lake), Seoul Playground, and Gallery Sue, and was free of charge. Recently, it was held from April 5 to 9 in 2023, and March 27 to 31 in 2024.

=== Fireworks Festival ===
The World Tower was completed in December 2016, and the fireworks festival was held for the first time on April 2, 2017. The venue is in the Lotte World Tower and Seokchon Lake area and is free of charge. There was a K-POP concert from 7:30 pm to 9 pm, a Lotte World Tower fireworks show from 9 pm to 9:10 pm, and recreation and giveaways from 9:10 to 9:30 pm. The Lotte World Tower Fireworks Show was held again on May 4, 2019, and was accompanied by an eight-hour public broadcast event in collaboration with CBS Music FM. From 2020 to 2022, it is not progressing due to COVID-19.

=== Professional golf ===
The Lotte Championship, an official event on the LPGA Tour held in Hawaii, has its trophy modeled after the World Tower.

== Evaluation ==
=== Citizen's evaluation ===
In 2014, Lotte held a 10-day pre- opening in the second week of September, commissioning experts to diagnose the structural safety of the building and offering preview tours to the public, which was generally well received, although it was pointed out that Lotte's actions were merely a publicity stunt for the building. The building under construction at the time received negative reviews for being dangerous and poorly constructed, but Lotte Engineering&Construction rehabilitated it, and in 2016 it received positive reviews for being safe and well designed for earthquake resistance. In 2017, Seoul residents rated the second Lotte World as safe and well designed.

== Gallery ==
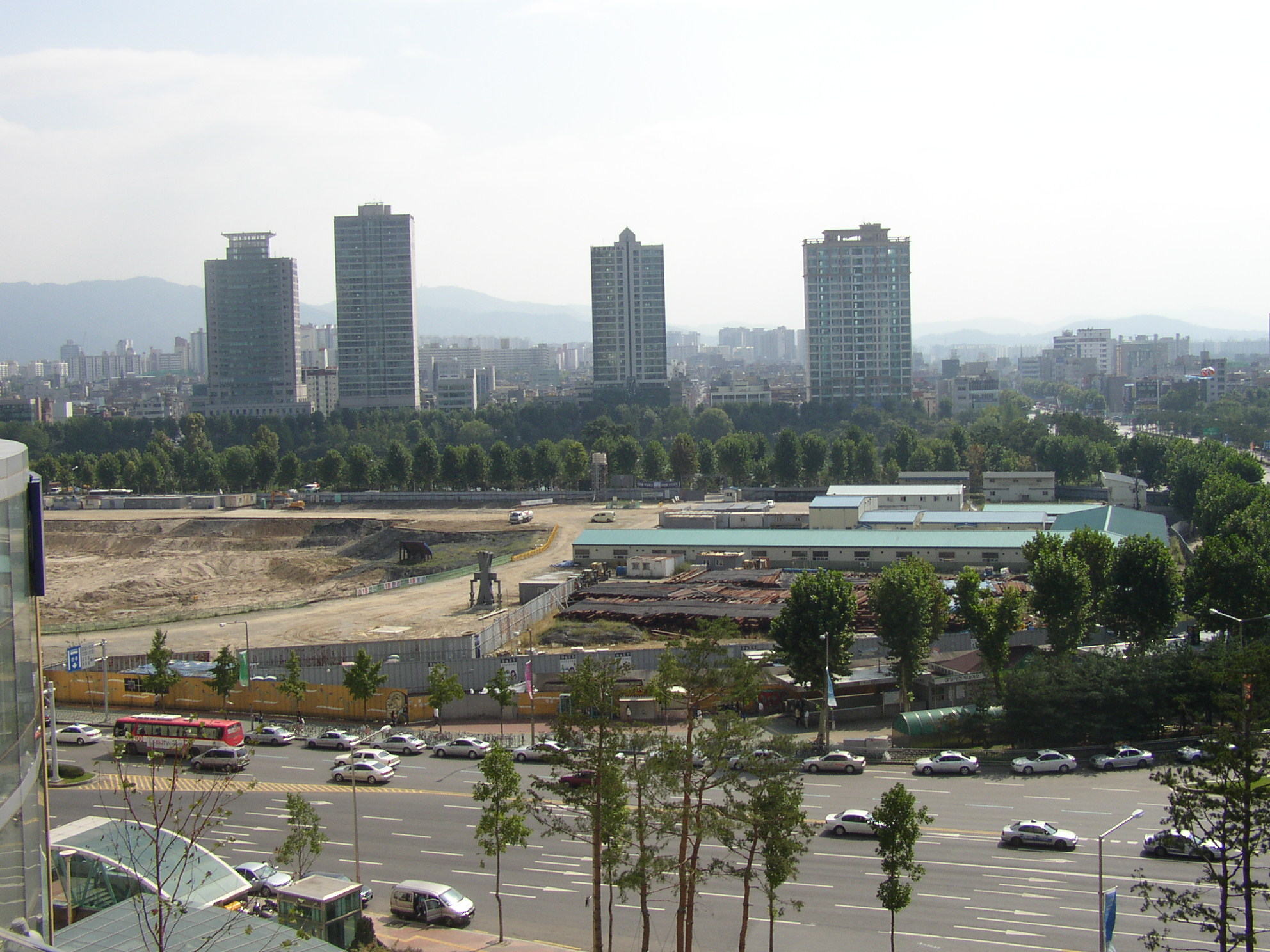
October 2007

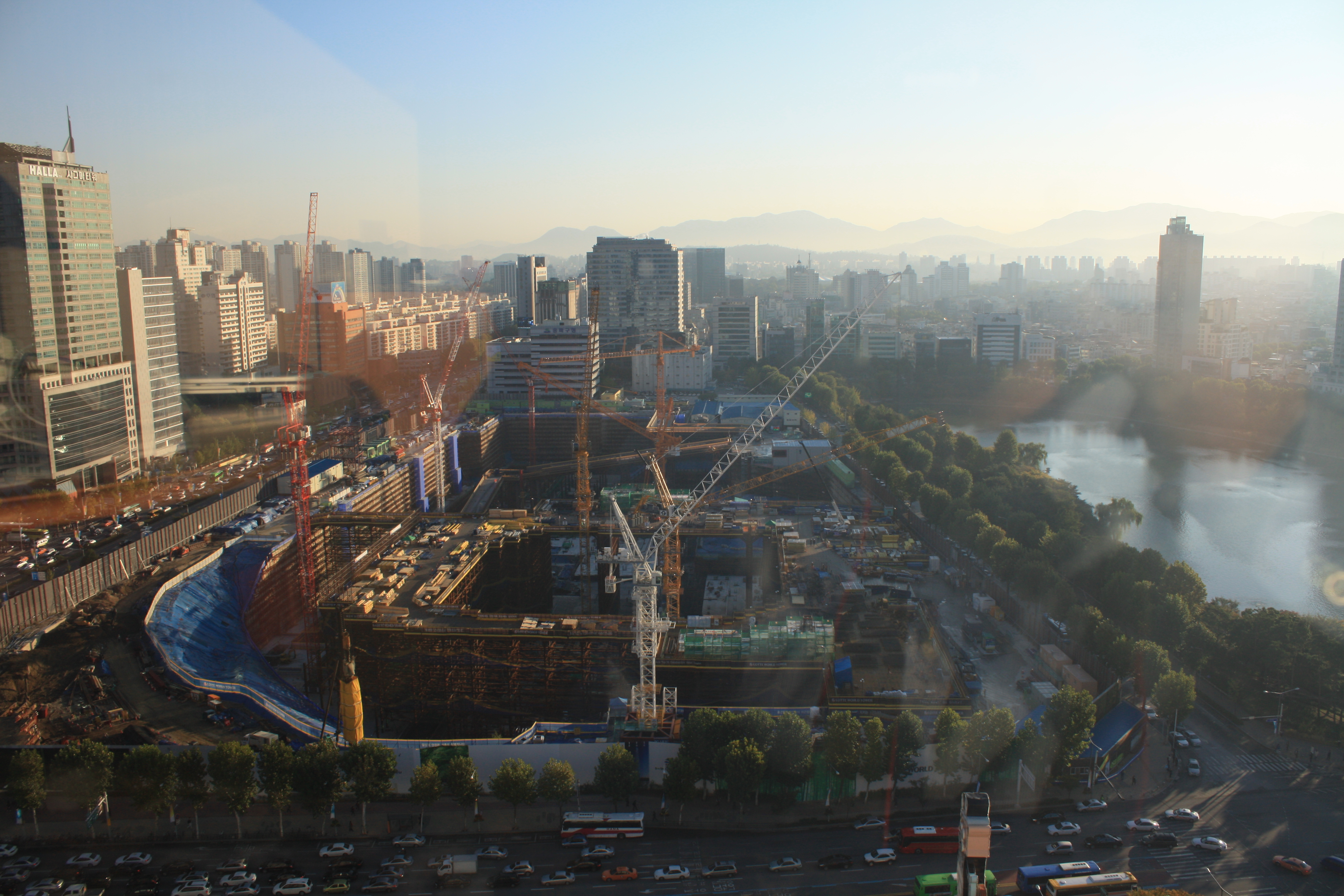
October 2011

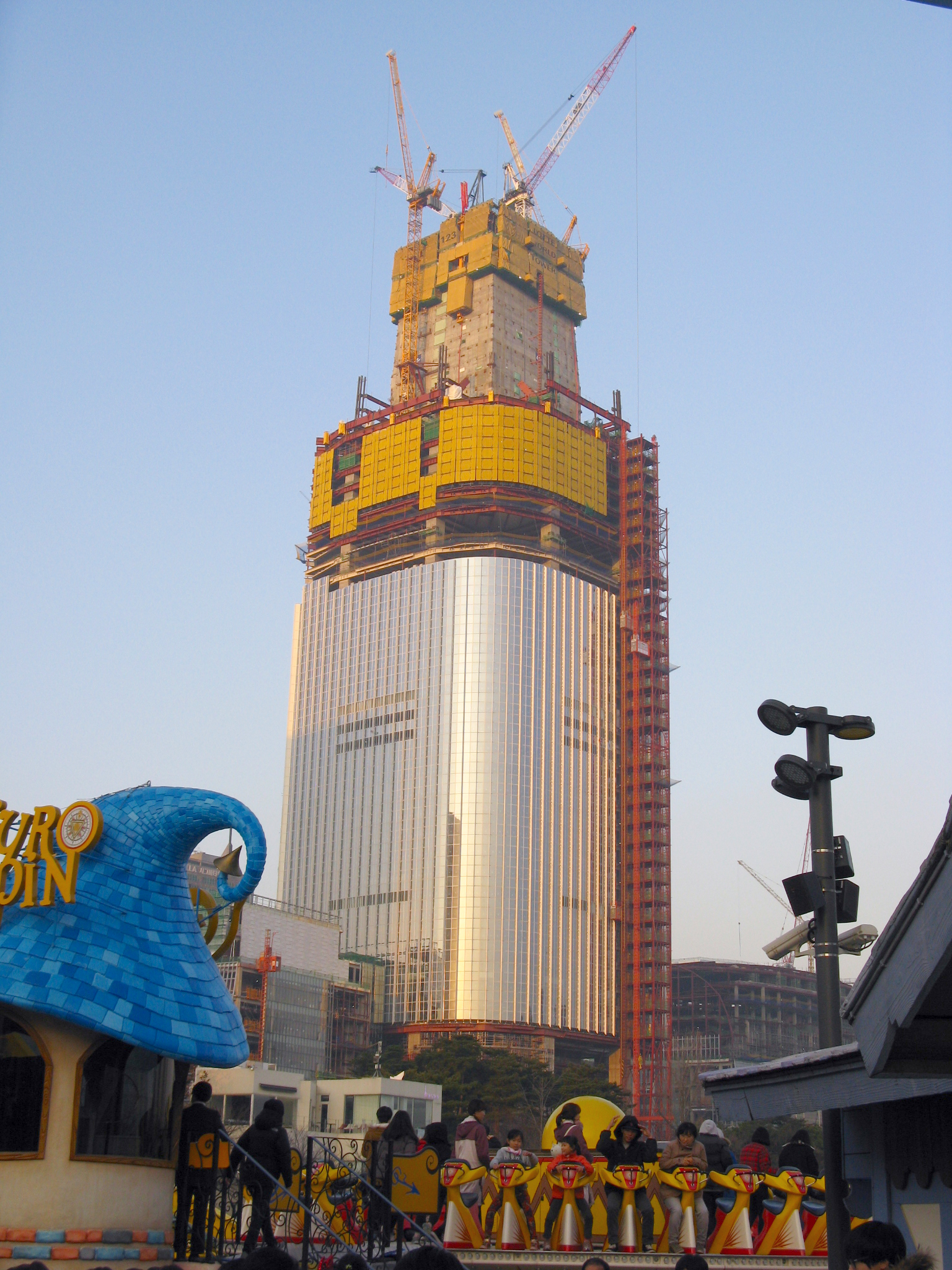
December 2013

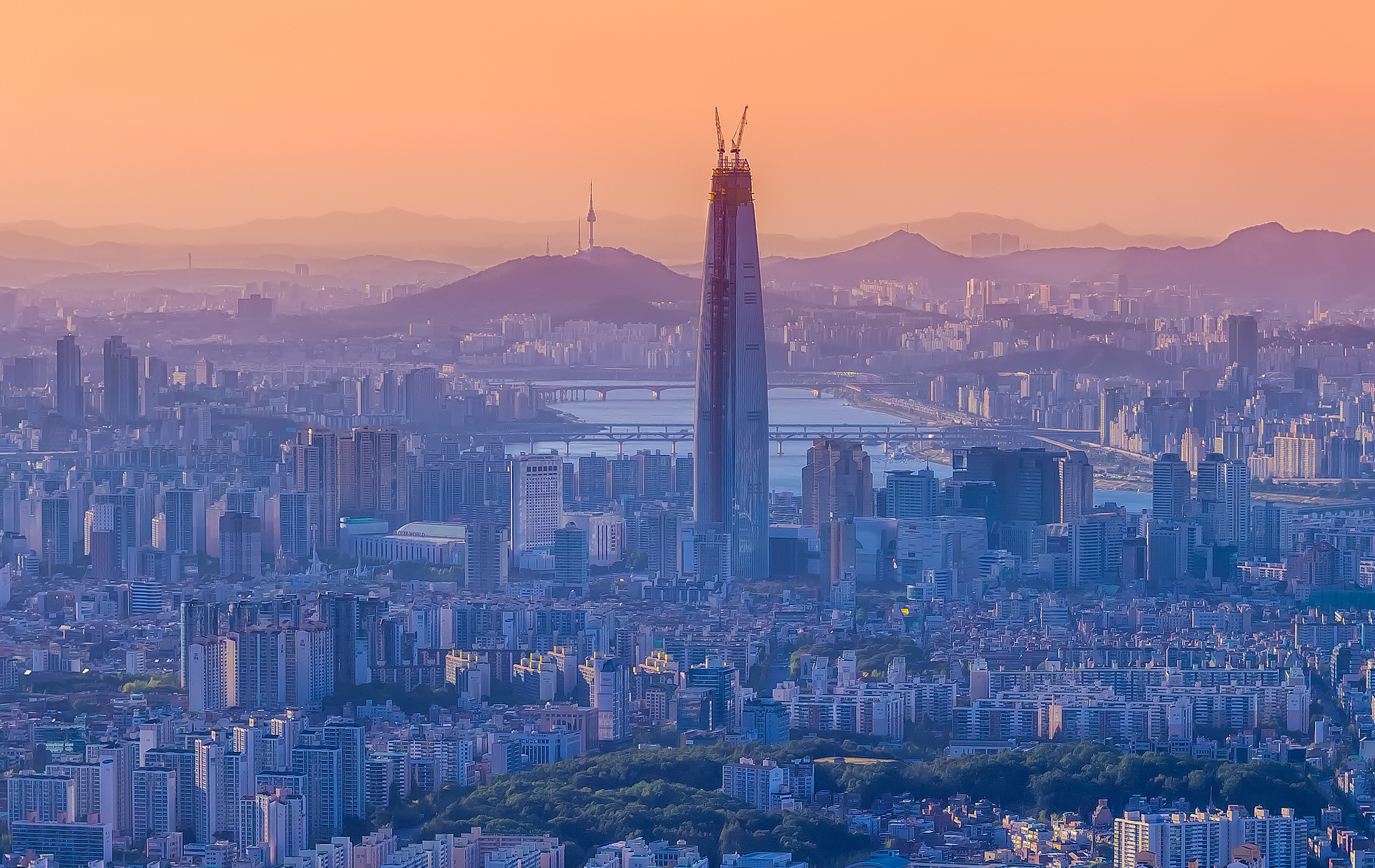
October 2015

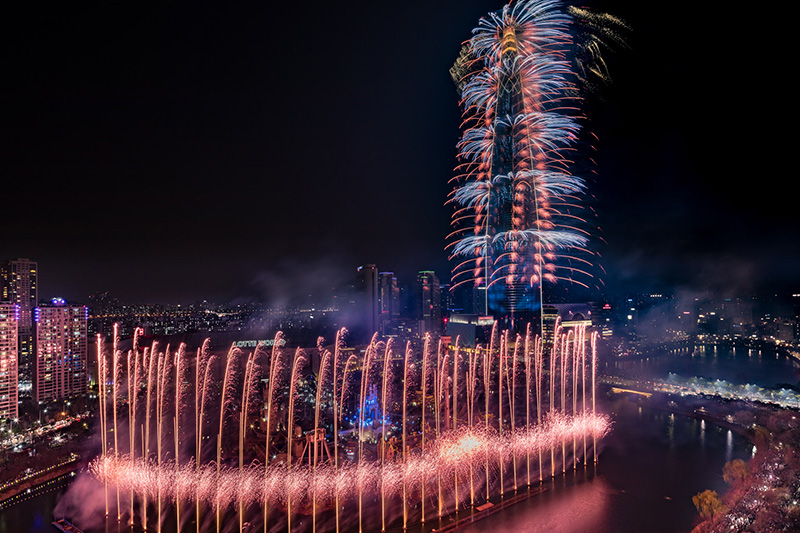
April 2017

November 2019

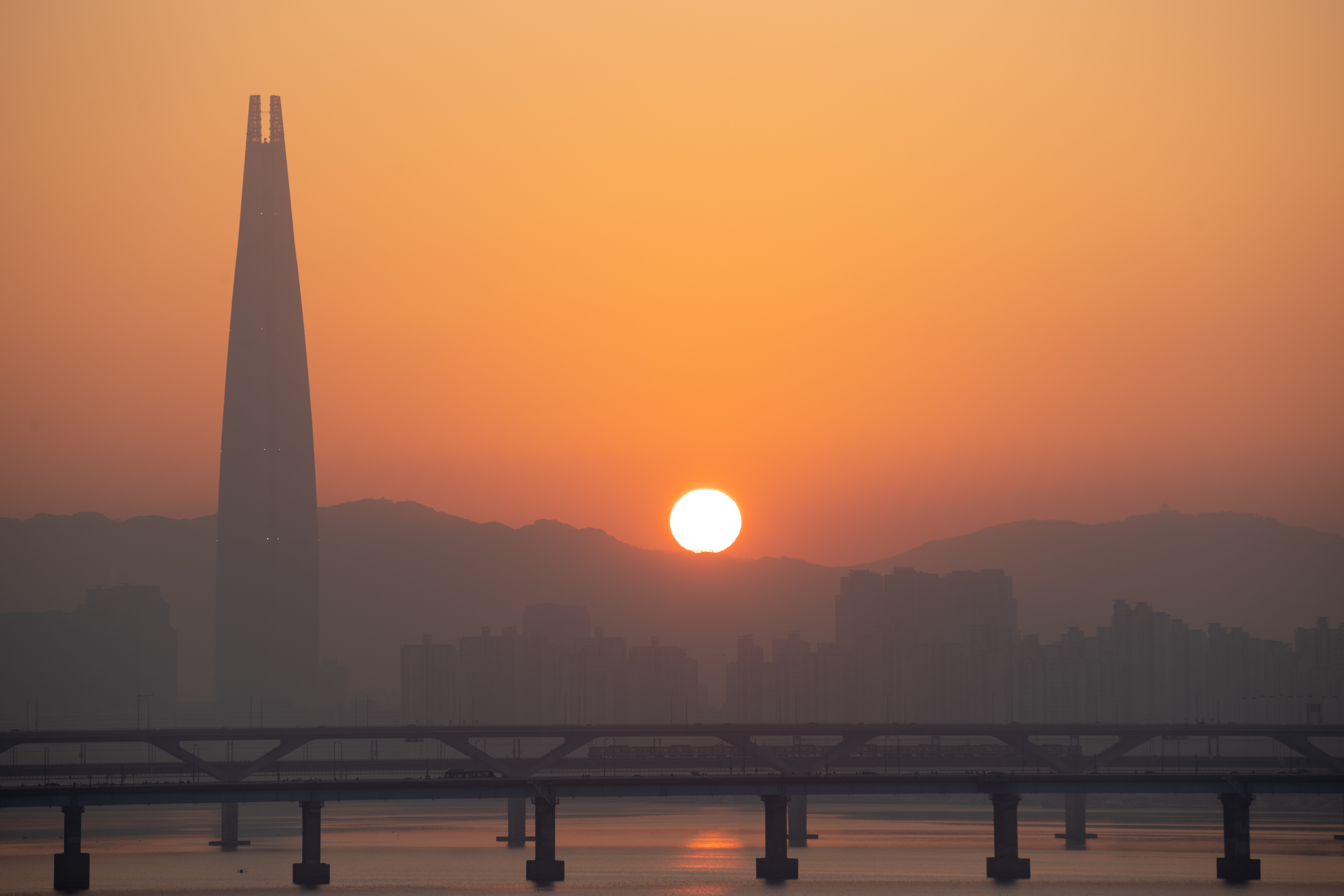
January 2023

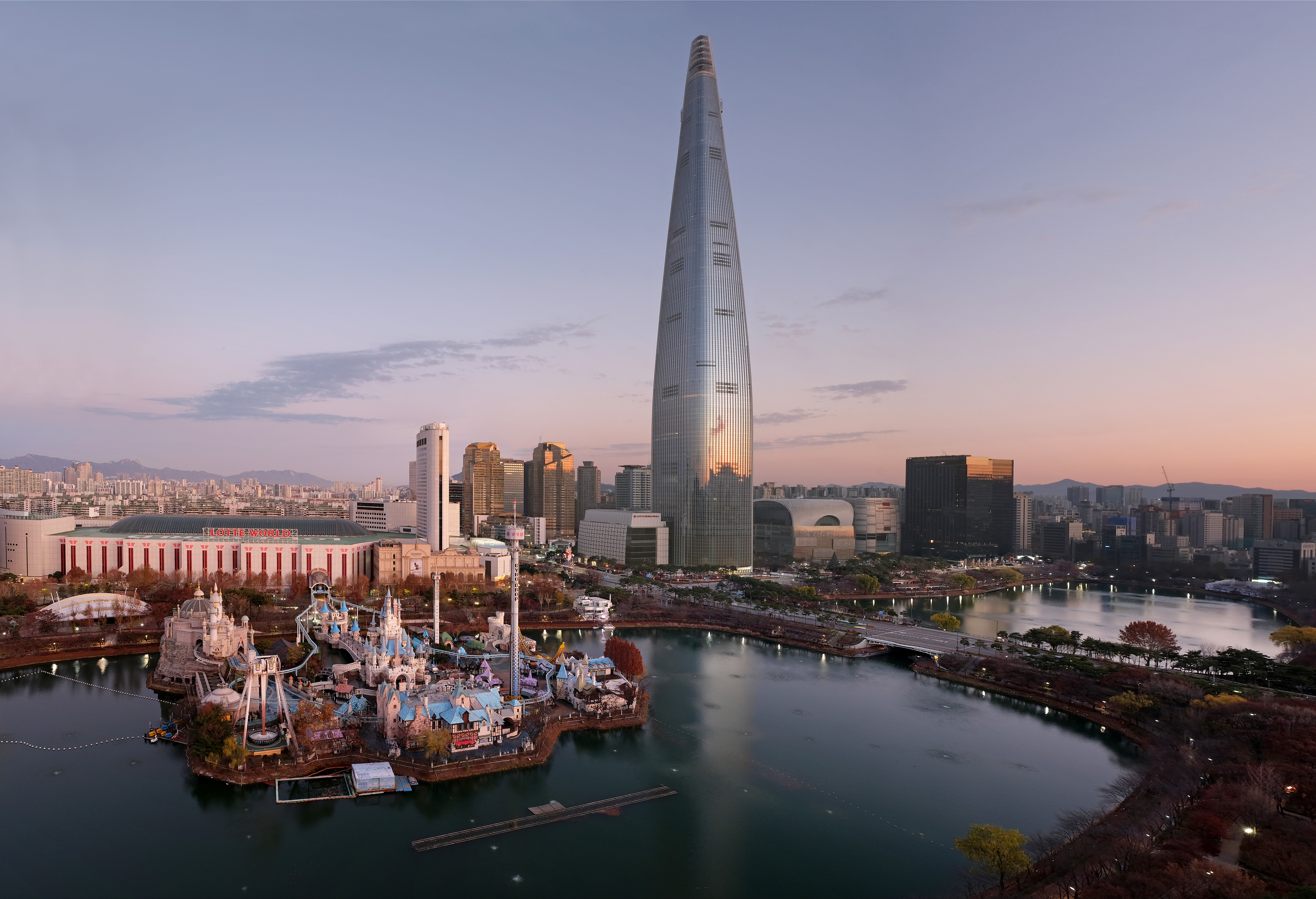
Lotte World and Lotte World Tower

== See also ==
- Busan Lotte Town Tower
- List of buildings with 100 floors or more
- List of tallest buildings in Seoul
- List of tallest buildings in South Korea
- List of worlds tallest buildings
- Lotte World
- Lotte World Mall
