= Busan Lotte Town Tower =

Skyscraper in South Korea

Busan Lotte Tower
- Construction site of Busan Lotte Town Tower in 2011
- Interactive map of the Busan Lotte Tower area

General information
- Status: Under construction
- Type: Office, hotel, residential
- Location: Busan, South Korea
- Coordinates: 35°05′51.06″N 129°02′14.34″E
- Groundbreaking: 17 December 2001; 24 years ago (Oldest: Lotte World 2 Tower); 26 February 2005; 21 years ago (First Before Old: Busan Lotte Tower); 9 March 2009; 17 years ago (First After Old: Busan Lotte Tower)
- Construction started: 17 October 2010; 15 years ago (Second Before Old: Busan lotte Tower); 29 April 2011; 14 years ago (Second After Old: Busan lotte Tower); 2023; 3 years ago (Buildings Newest: Lotte Town Tower)
- Completed: 2028
- Owner: Lotte Shopping Co. Ltd

Height
- Antenna spire: 510.1 m (1,674 ft)
- Roof: 471 m (1,545 ft)

Technical details
- Floor count: 85
- Floor area: 255,146 m^{2} (2,746,370 ft^{2})
- Lifts/elevators: 5

Design and construction
- Architect: Skidmore, Owings and Merrill
- Structural engineer: Skidmore, Owings and Merrill

The Busan Lotte Tower (Korean: 부산롯데타워) is a 108-floor, 510.1 m (1,674 ft) supertall skyscraper on hold in Busan, South Korea. The tower is planned on a site next to Nampo-dong station on Busan Subway Line 1.

The tower is the centerpiece of the new Busan Lotte Town and construction is being carried out in four phases. The first phase includes a department store, completed in 2009. During the second phase, an addition to the department store was completed in 2010. The third phase will be a market and a cinema, which was completed in 2014, and the last phase will include a luxury hotel, an observation deck, offices, and cultural facilities in a 107-story skyscraper. The design of the skyscraper is intended to resemble a standing ship, in reference to the city's harbour. The tower's underground parking space will be able to house over 2,400 cars. The tower will contain retail outlets (floors 1–11), offices (12-36), residences (41-78), a luxury hotel (82-104), and public access floors (107-110) with an observation deck.

In September 2013, the construction work was stopped due to the lack of funding. As of August 2023, construction has resumed, with the facility now being estimated to be complete by 2028.

== Floor Plans ==
Floors	Use
107-110	Observation Deck
82-104	Lotte Town Hotel
41-78	Residence
12-36	Offices
1-11	Prime Outlets
B1-B5	Parking lot

== Gallery ==
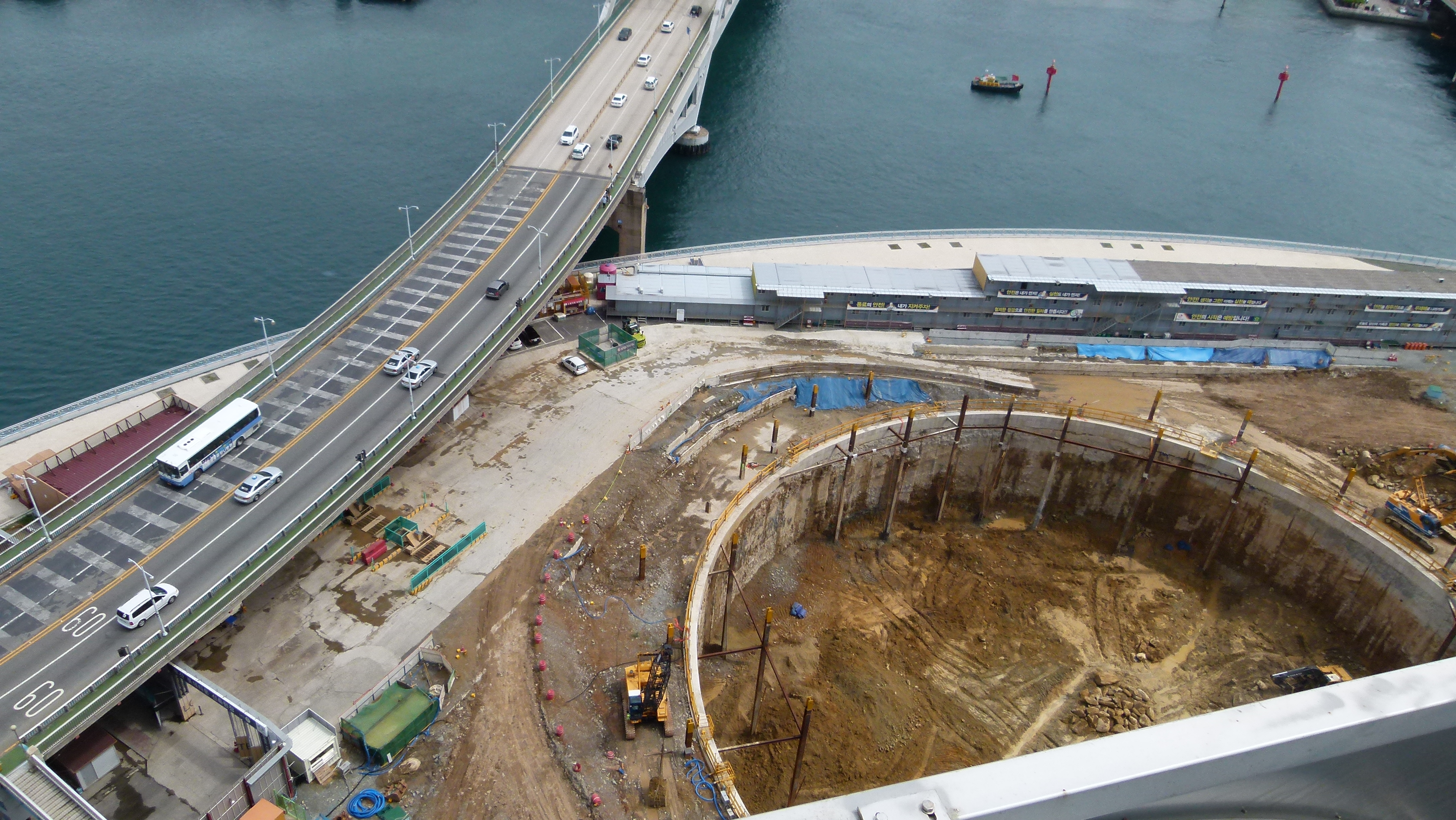
Under construction, August 2011

== See also ==
- Lotte World
- Lotte World Tower
- List of buildings with 100 floors or more
