= Tower Infinity =

Infinity Tower
- Alternative names: Ecoprism Tower

General information
- Status: Under Construction
- Type: Leisure and Entertainment
- Location: Cheongna International City, Incheon, South Korea
- Coordinates: 37°31′58.68″N 126°38′02.77″E
- Construction started: 21 November 2019
- Estimated completion: 2029
- Client: Korea Land and Housing Corporation

Height
- Architectural: 448 m (1,470 ft)
- Tip: 448 m (1,470 ft)
- Observatory: 397 m (1,302 ft)

Technical details
- Floor count: 27

Design and construction
- Architects: GDS Architects, Samoo Architects & Engineers
- Structural engineer: King-Le Chang & Associates
- Awards: First prize in a National Design Competition sponsored by Korea Land and Housing Corporation

Other information
- Parking: 2000 spaces

Cheongna City Tower, Tower Infinity or Ecoprism Tower is a tower to be constructed near the Incheon Airport just outside Seoul, South Korea. The tower is dubbed as the "world's first invisible tower". The invisibility illusion will be achieved with an LED facade system. The tower is built primarily for leisure activities. The building will be spread over an area of 145,500 m^{2} (1,566,000 sq ft). The Design by GDS got first prize in a National Design Competition sponsored by Korea Land and Housing Corporation. The South Korean government gave approval to build the tower in September 2013.

== Design philosophy ==
GDS won Korea Land Corporation's design competition in 2008 from 146 entries from 46 countries which aimed to find a new building to symbolize the position of South Korea. Instead of going after height they decided to come up with something innovative that symbolises Korea.

Although height is not the selling point of the tower, the 450-meter (1,480 ft)-tall tower, when completed, will be the sixth tallest tower in the world and will have the third highest observatory in the world.

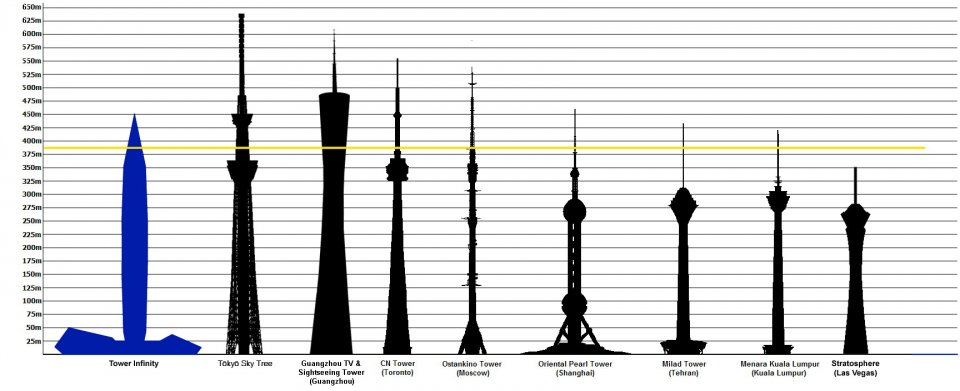
Tallest towers in the world.

== Invisibility ==
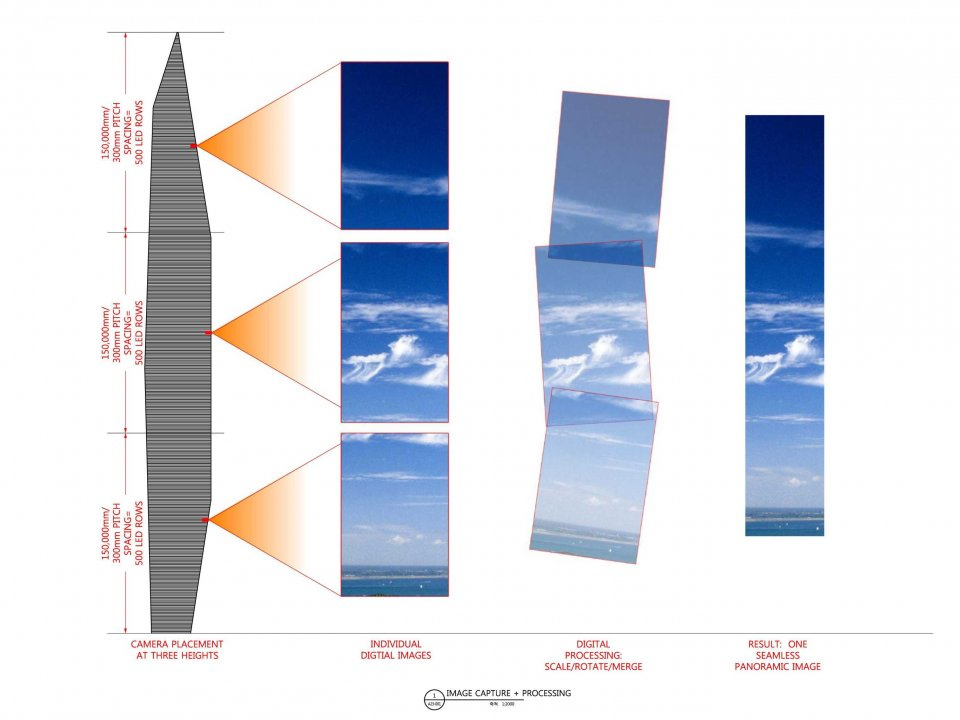
Capturing and processing of image from camera

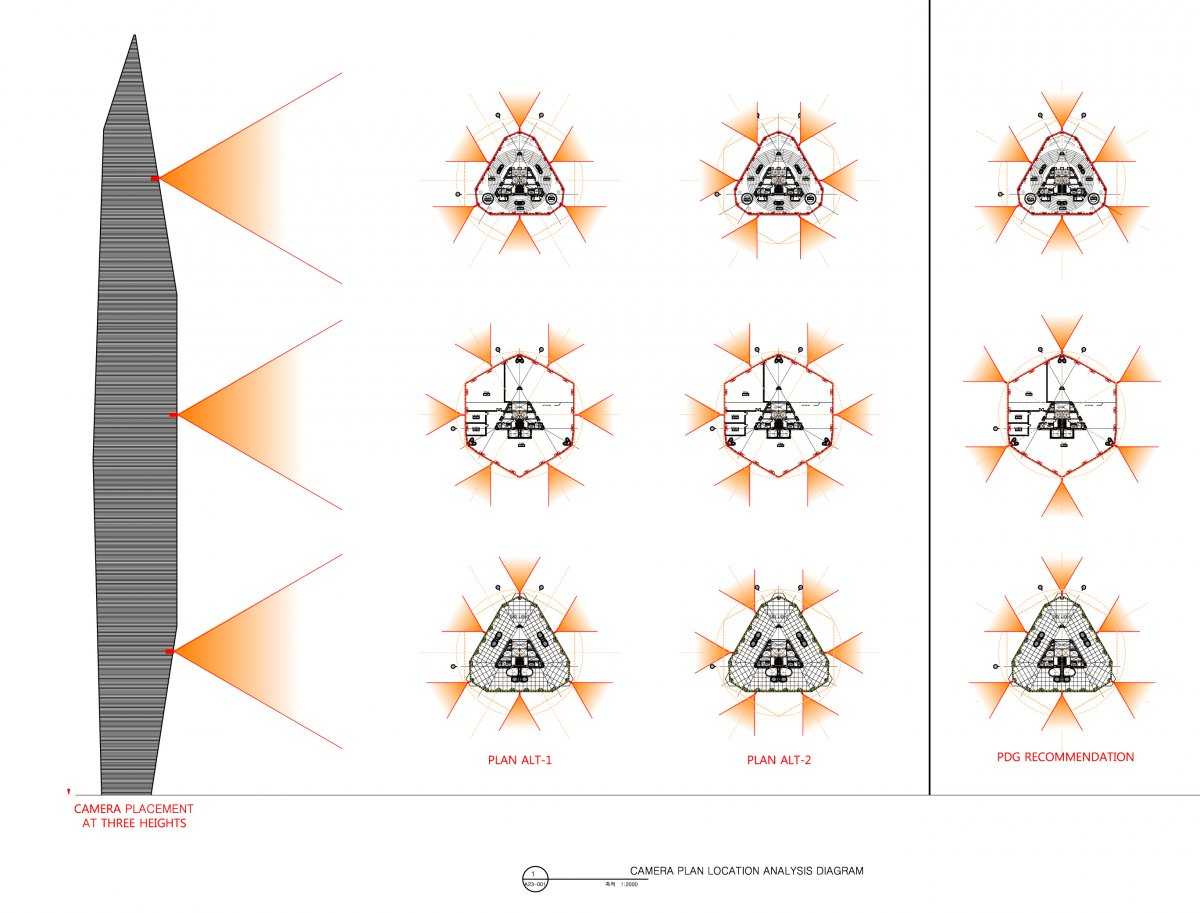
Camera and projector placement

The tower is intended to have the ability to "disappear". The tower will have high definition cameras placed at three different levels on all six sides of the tower. The cameras will acquire real time images. These images will be processed and will be stitched into a monolithic image that will be projected by three sets of 500 rows of LED screens to the other side of the building, all in real time. Three projections at different heights on all three sections are proposed. The pitch of the LED decides the sharpness of the image - the shorter the pitch, the sharper the image will be. Different levels of illumination are used to achieve different degrees of 'invisibility'.

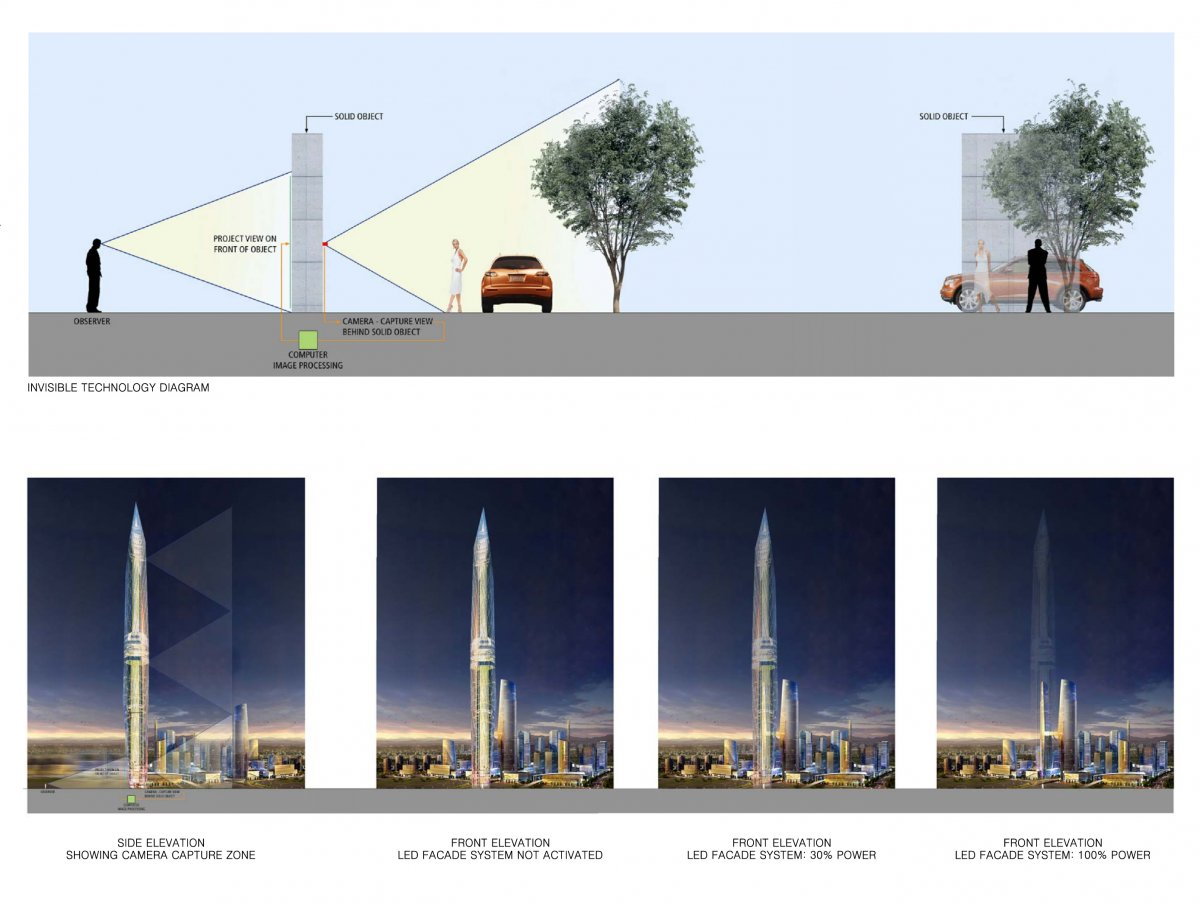
Illustration of how the tower goes Invisible

Because of the arrangement of the LED screens, the tower will appear invisible from only certain points distributed around the tower, ranging from areas near the tower to areas as far as Seoul Bridge, located about 2 kilometers (1.2 mi) away. The screens will be so arranged that the tower will be visible from high altitudes, such as to airplanes and birds.

== Purpose ==
Tower Infinity will be used primarily for entertainment and leisure purposes with a 4D theater, restaurants, a water park, landscaped gardens and the third-highest observation deck in the world. When the tower invisibility cloak is turned off the projectors may be used as a huge billboard for broadcasting special events and advertisements. The floor plan is open enabling people to look at multiple floors on ascent. The tower will also have a slow high capacity elevator that will stop at different heights, displaying real time views of other world monuments.
