= Metapolis =

Skyscraper complex in Hwaseong, South Korea

Coordinates: 37°12′18″N 127°04′08″E

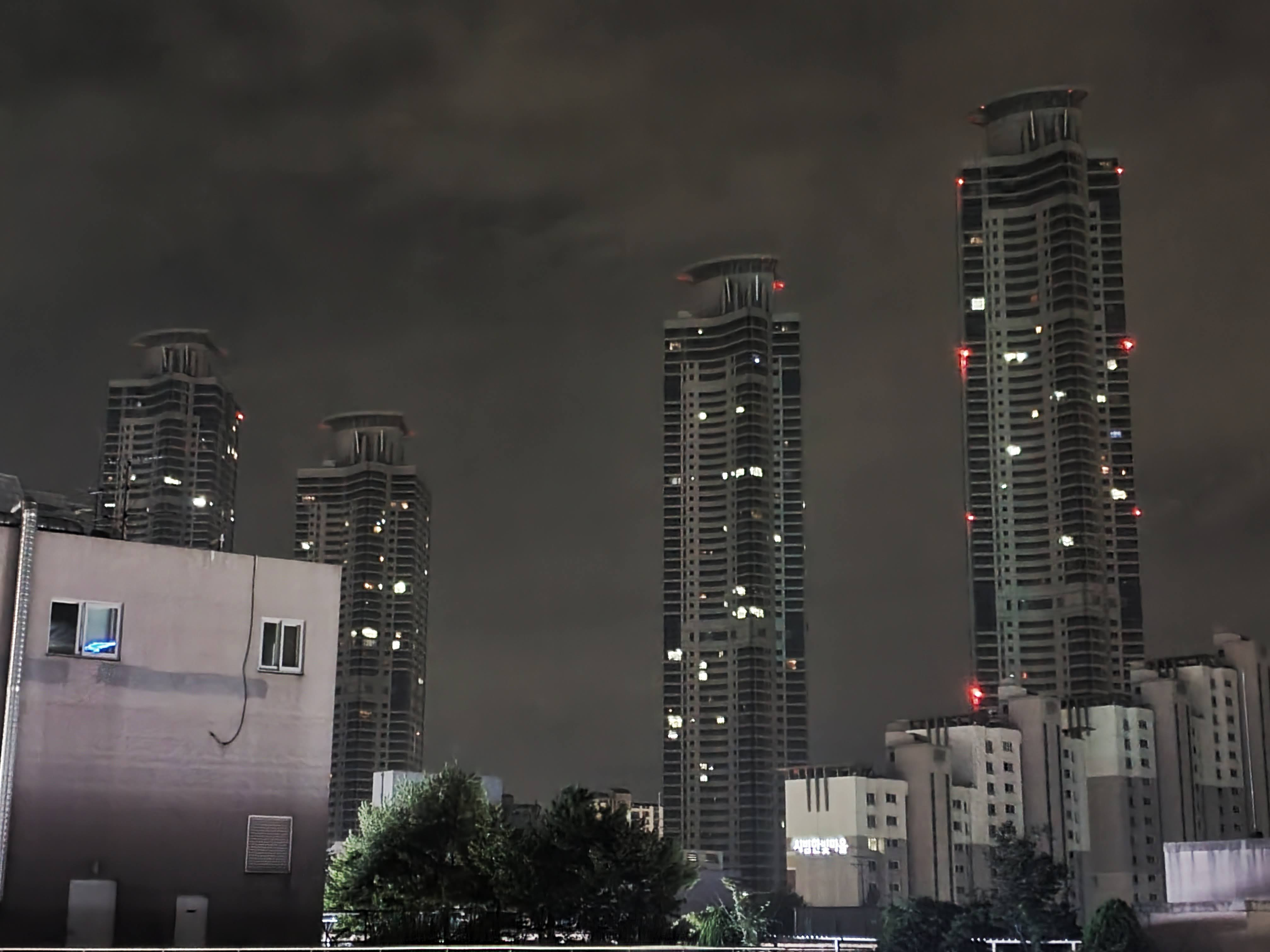
Metapolis at Night

Metapolis is a complex of four residential skyscrapers in Hwaseong, South Korea With the ground broken in July 2006 by POSCO E&C and the buildings topped-out in August 2009, the structures were completed in July 2010. The two tallest towers (#101 and #104) have heights of 249m and 247m respectively and 66 storeys each, making them the third-tallest residential skyscrapers in South Korea and the centerpiece of the New Dongtan City. The two shorter skyscrapers are 60 (#102) and 55 (#103) floors in height, measuring 224m and 203m respectively.
