= Yangjae station =

Station of the Seoul Metropolitan Subway

양재 (서초구청); Yangjae (Seocho-gu Office)
D08
양재 (서초구청)
Yangjae
(Seocho-gu Office)
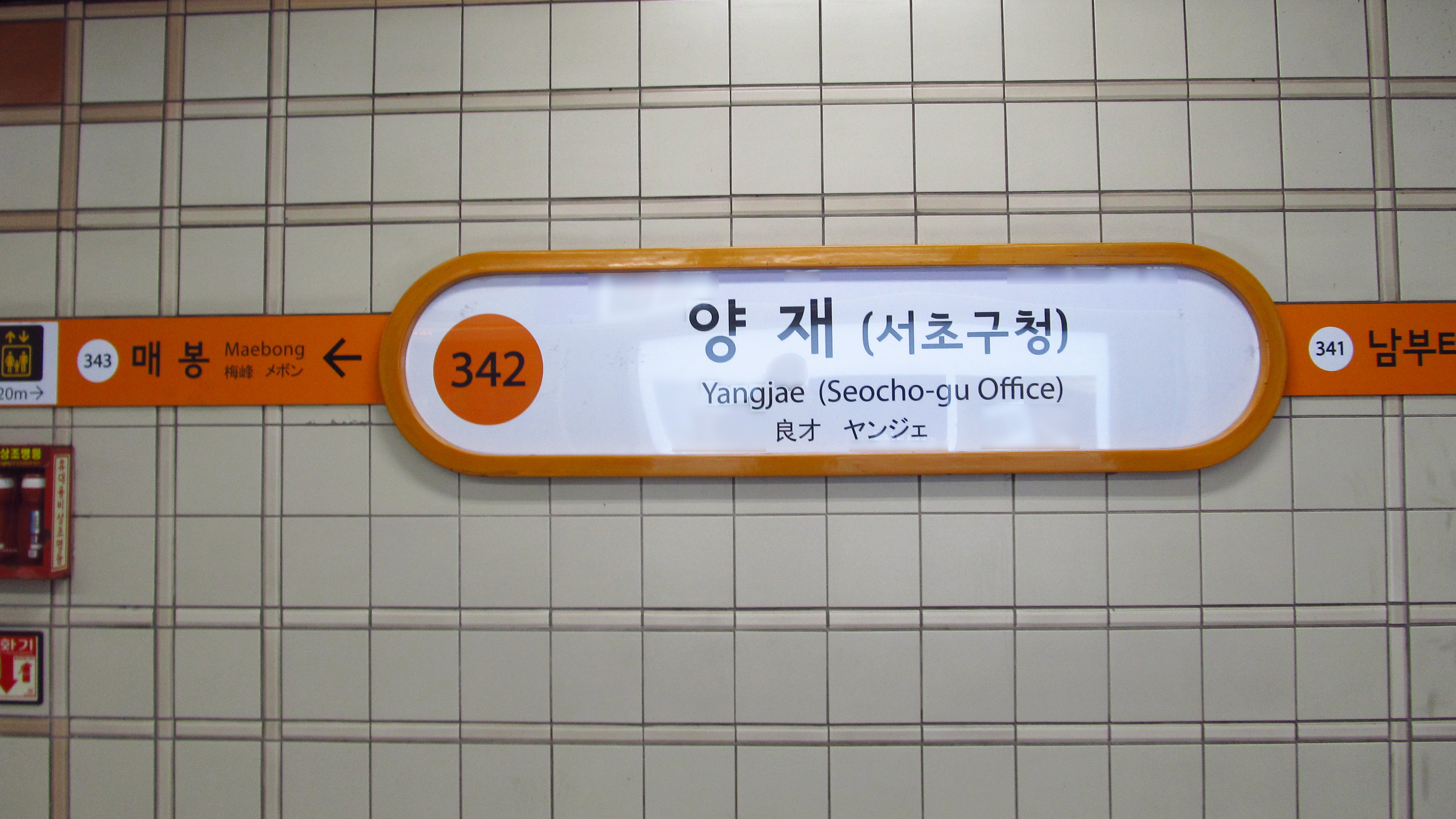
- Station Sign (Line 3)

Korean name
- Hangul: 양재역
- Hanja: 良才驛
- Revised Romanization: Yangjae-yeok
- McCune–Reischauer: Yangjae-yŏk

General information
- Location: 2585 Nambusunhwan-ro, 12-1 Yangjae-dong, Seocho-gu, Seoul
- Coordinates: 37°29′04″N 127°02′02″E
- Operator: Seoul Metro; Shinbundang Railroad Corporation
- Lines: Line 3 Shinbundang Line
- Platforms: 4
- Tracks: 4

Construction
- Structure type: Underground

Key dates
- October 18, 1985: Line 3 opened
- October 28, 2011: Shinbundang Line opened

Passengers
- (Daily) Based on Jan-Dec of 2012. Line 3: 86,862; Shinbundang Line: 8,845

Services
Preceding station	Seoul Metropolitan Subway	Following station
Nambu Bus Terminal towards Daehwa	Line 3	Maebong towards Ogeum
Gangnam towards Sinsa	Shinbundang Line	Yangjae Citizen's Forest towards Gwanggyo
Location

Yangjae (Seocho-gu Office) Station is a station on the Seoul Subway Line 3 and Shinbundang Line. It was the southern terminus of Line 3 until October 30, 1993, when the line was extended to Suseo station, and it became a transfer station with the Shinbundang Line on October 28, 2011. It is located in Yangjae-dong, Seocho and Gangnam District, Seoul.

It serves as an important mass transit hub for commuters who travel between Seoul and suburban cities such as Bundang, Yongin, and Suwon.

== Station layout ==
G	Street level	Exit
L1; Concourse	Lobby	Customer Service, Shops, Vending machines, ATMs
L2	Side platform, doors will open on the right
L2	Northbound	← Line 3 toward Daehwa (Nambu Bus Terminal)
L2	Southbound	Line 3 toward Ogeum (Maebong) →
L2	Side platform, doors will open on the right
L3	Side platform, doors will open on the left
L3	Southbound	Shinbundang Line toward Gwanggyo (Yangjae Citizen's Forest) →
L3	Northbound	← Shinbundang Line toward Sinsa (Gangnam)
L3	Side platform, doors will open on the left

== Vicinity ==
- Exit 1: Hanjin Art Center
- Exit 2: Yeongdong Middle School, Woosung APT
- Exit 3: Eungseong Middle & Eungwang girls'High Schools
- Exit 4: Eonju Elementary School
- Exit 5: Seocho Social Welfare Center
- Exit 6: Yangjae Il(1)-Dong
- Exit 7: Korean Educational Development Institute (KEDI)
- Exit 8: Seocho District Office, Yangjae High School, Institute of Foreign Affairs & National Security

== Nearby areas of interest ==
=== Citizens' Forest ===
Yangjae Citizens' Forest is located near Yangjae Tollgate on the Gyeongbu Expressway, the entrance to Seoul City. Built for the 1986 Asian Games and 1988 Seoul Olympics, the land was prepared in July 1983 as part of Gaepo-dong Land Arrangement Plan. The construction of the Forest continued for about three years and completed in November 1986. The total area is 358,992 sq. meters. The park's major facilities include landscaped facilities, such as Grass Field, Octagonal Pavilion, and Pagora (wisteria trellis). The Forest also has sports facilities, such as tennis and basketball courts. Other major structures in the Forest include the Memorial Hall for Patriot Yun Bonggil, a parking lot, children's playground, and an outdoor wedding hall.

- Location: 236, Yangjae 2-dong
- Admission: Free
- Parking: capacity for 571 cars
- Yangjae station exit 7, 20 minutes walk or transfer to bus (get off at Yangjae Citizens' Forest).
- Yangjae Citizens' Forest

=== Yangjaecheon ===
Yangjaecheon is a 5.5 km long body of water that stretches from Gwanak-san through the southern area of Gangnam-gu. There are two swimming areas for kids, a number of stepping stone bridges to cross, and two sites for an ecosystem watch.

- Yangjae station exit 7, 18 minutes walk.
- Yangjae Stream

== Gallery ==
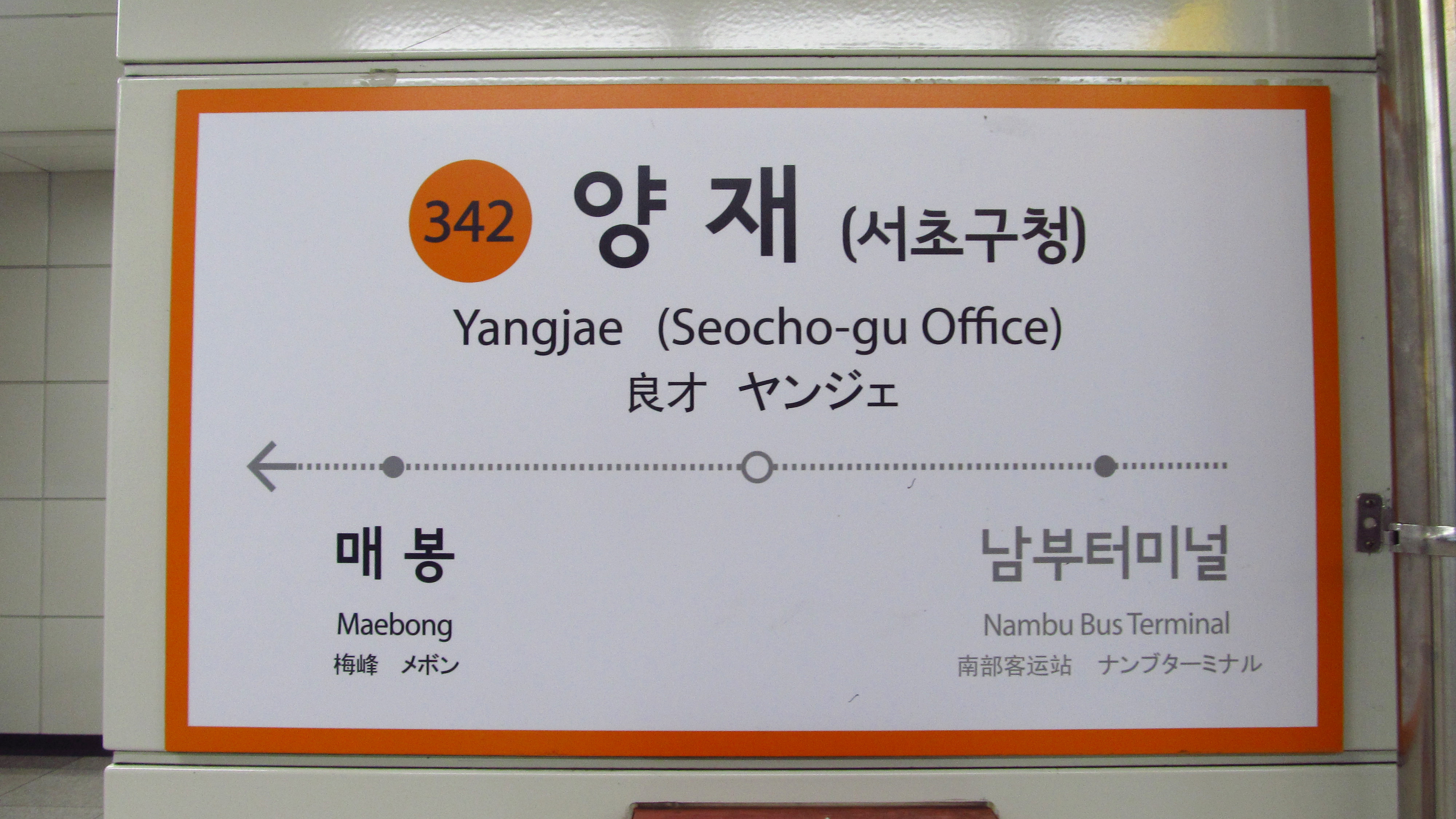
Station Sign (on wall) (Line 3)

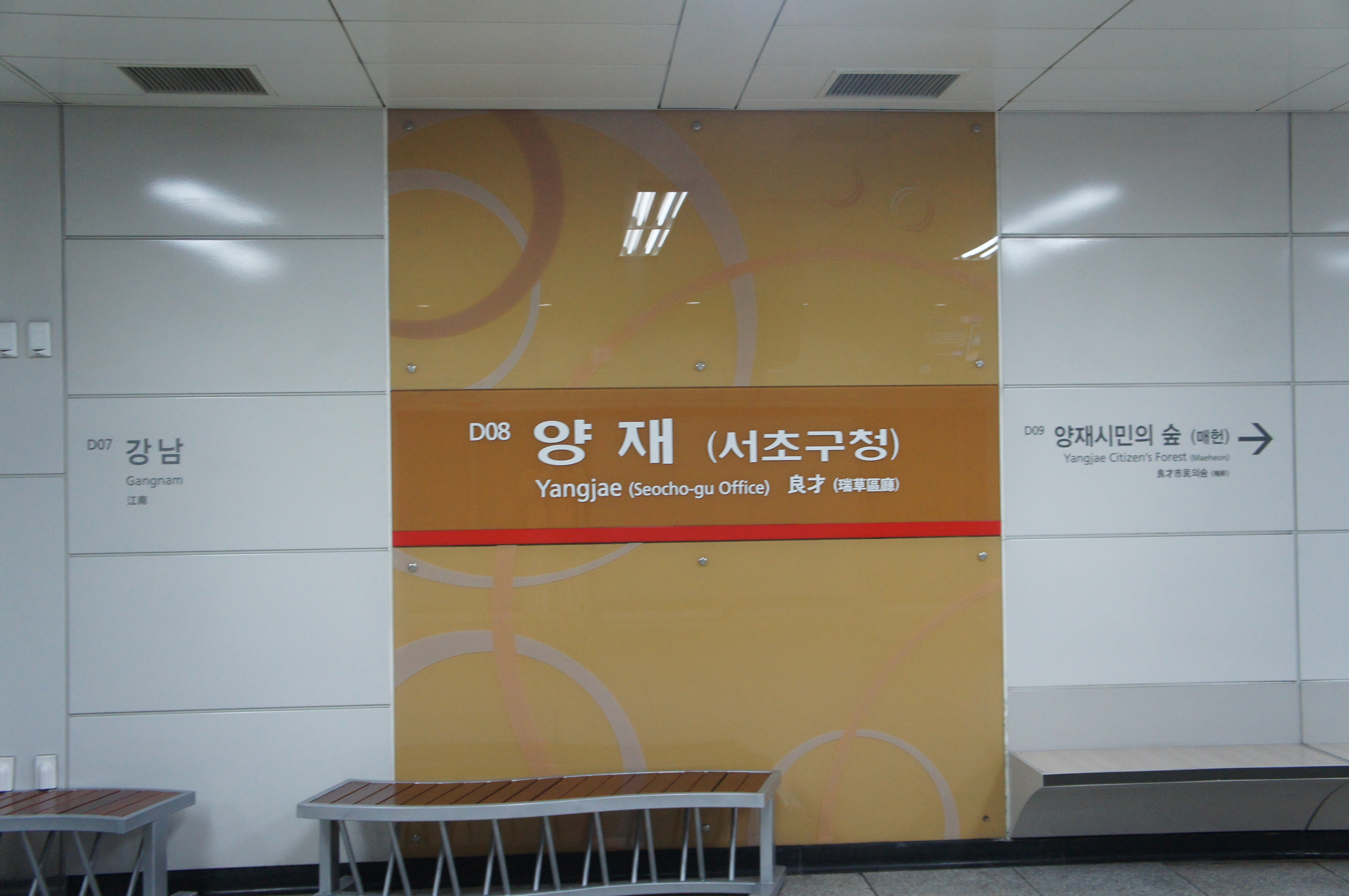
Station Sign (Shinbundang Line)

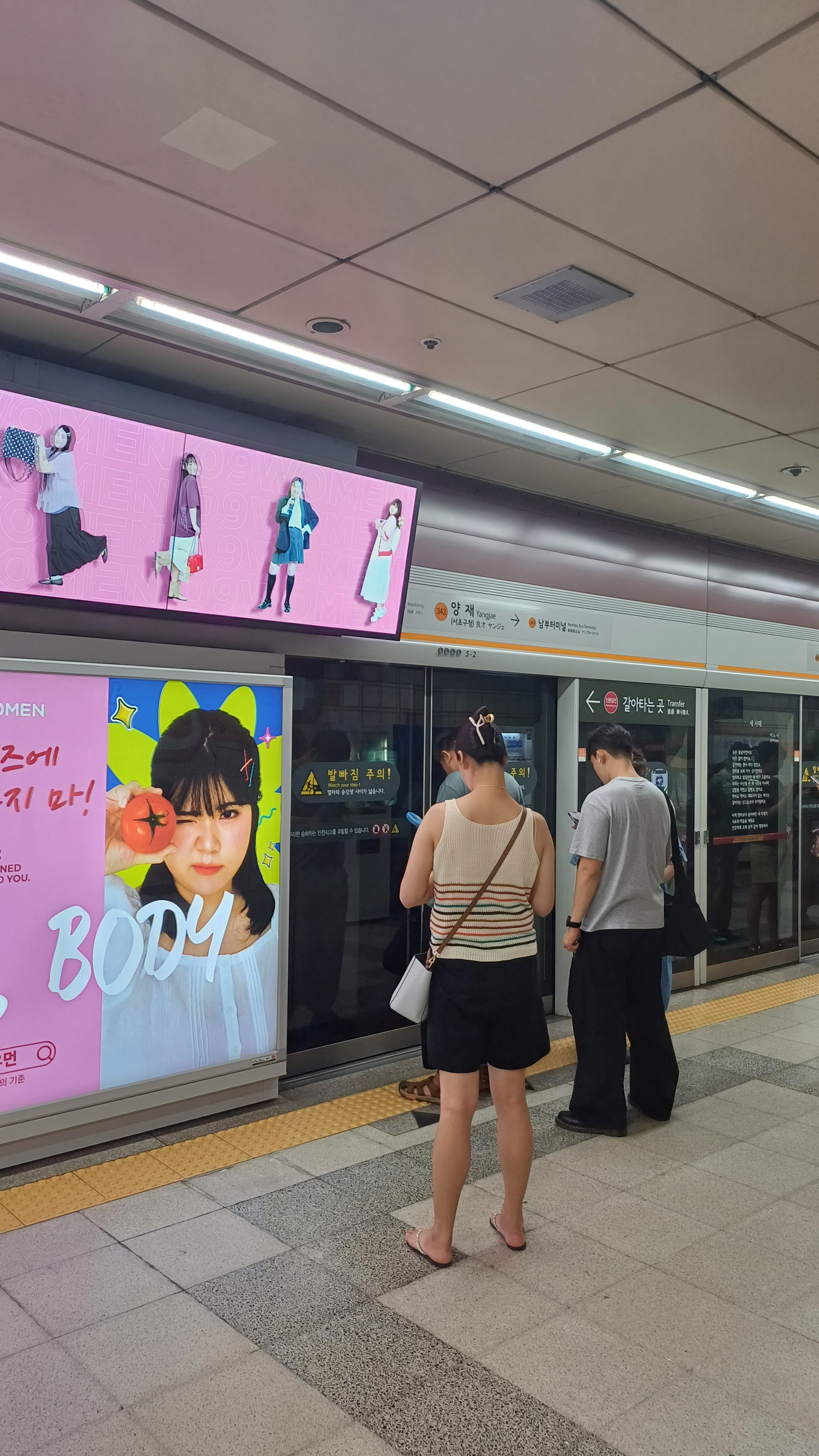
Line 3 platform

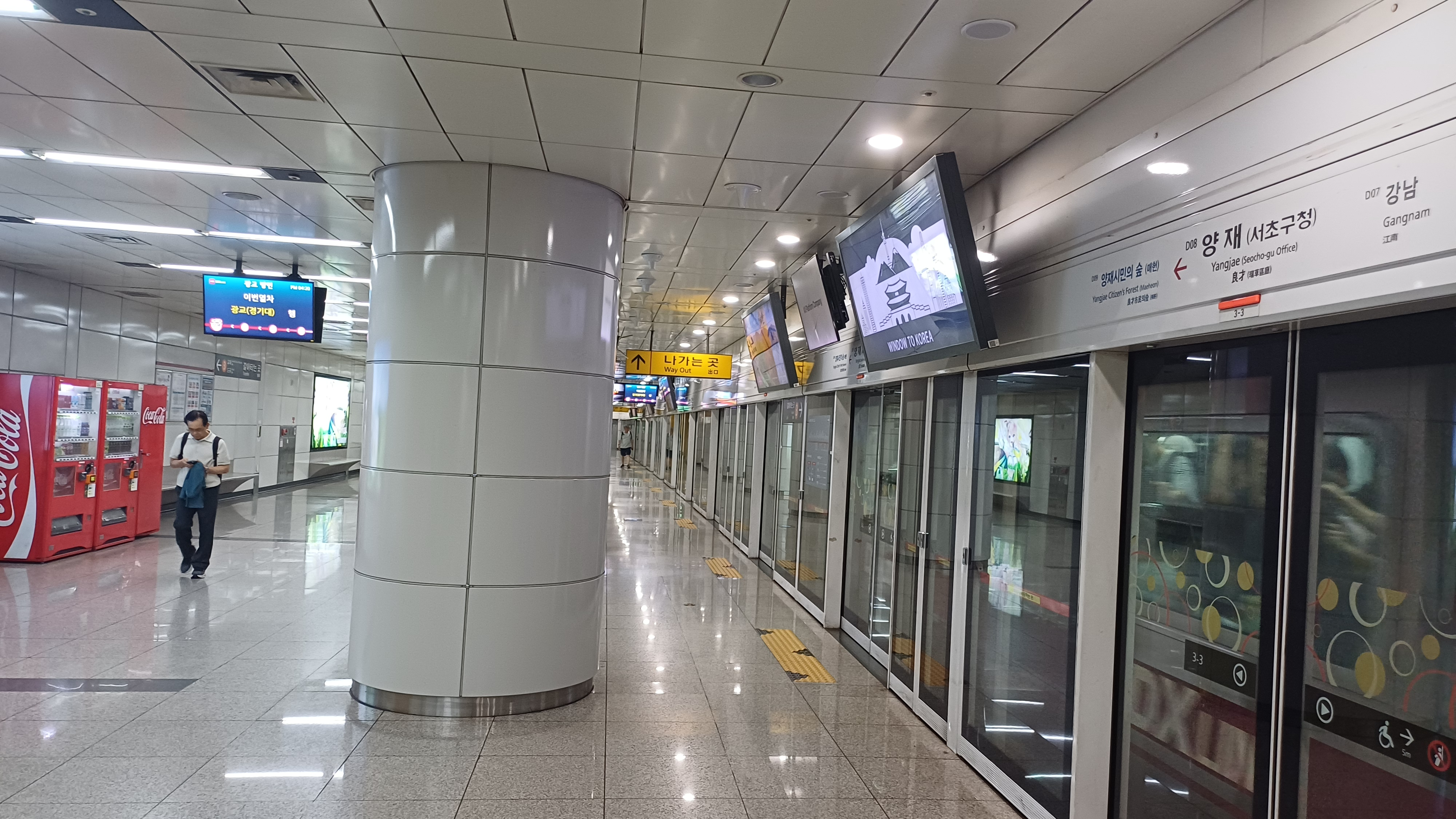
Line Shinbundang platform
