= Rosewater (disambiguation) =

Rosewater is a flavoured water made by steeping rose petals in water.

Rosewater may also refer to:

== Arts and entertainment ==
- Alex Rosewater, a character in The Big O anime series
- Amanda Rosewater, a fictional character in the science fiction TV series Defiance
- Eliot Rosewater, a recurring character in the novels of Kurt Vonnegut
- Rosewater (film), 2014 film directed by Jon Stewart
- Rosewater (Thompson novel), 2016 novel by Tade Thompson
- Rosewater (Little novel), 2023 novel by Liv Little
- Rosewater (video game), 2025 point & click adventure game set in an alternate history Old West

== People ==
- Mark Rosewater (b. 1967), game designer

== Other uses ==
- Rosewater, South Australia, a suburb of Adelaide

== See also ==
- Rose Bay (disambiguation)
- Rosewater syndrome, a type of androgen insensitivity syndrome
