= Yangjae-dong =

Neighborhood in Seoul, South Korea

Coordinates: 35°10′N 126°24′E

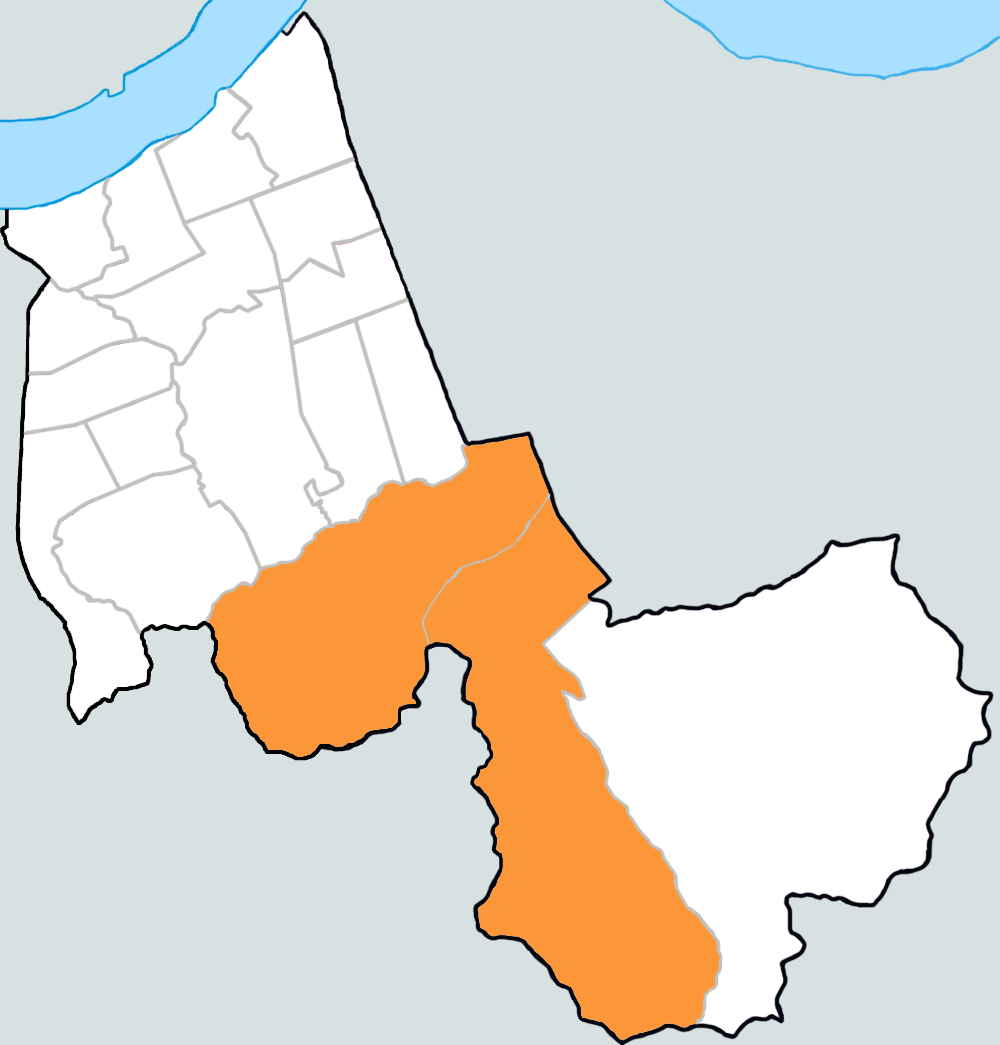
- Yangjae-dong within Seocho District
- Country: South Korea

Area
  - Total: 13.34 km^{2} (5.15 sq mi)

Population (2012)
  - Total: 53,783
  - Density: 4,032/km^{2} (10,440/sq mi)

Korean name
- Hangul: 양재동
- Hanja: 良才洞
- RR: Yangjae-dong
- MR: Yangjae-dong

Yangjae-dong (Korean: 양재동) is a Dong (neighborhood) of Seocho District, Seoul, South Korea. Yangjae-dong is divided into 2 different dong which are Yangjae 1-dong and 2-dong.

Yangjae High School (YHS), part of Gangnam school district 8, is nearby Yangjae-dong and Torch Trinity Graduate University is located in Yangjae-dong.

== History ==
- July 1, 1973 Change from Yeongdeungpo District to Seongdong District.
- October 1, 1975 Change from Seongdong District to Gangnam District.
- January 1, 1988 Change from Gangnam District to Seocho District
- 1992 Subdivided into Yangjae 1 and 2-dong.

== Education ==
- High Schools
  - Yangjae High School
  - Eonnam High School
- Middle Schools
  - Eonnam Middle School
  - Rainbow International School
- Elementary Schools
  - Maeheon Elementary School
  - Yangjae Elementary School

== Transportation ==
- Yangjae Station of and of Shinbundang Line
- Yangjae Citizen's Forest Station of Shinbundang Line
- Cheonggyesan Station of Shinbundang Line

== See also ==
- Administrative divisions of South Korea
