= Torch Trinity Graduate University =

Christian school in Seoul, South Korea

Coordinates: 37°28′45.00″N 127°02′01.00″E

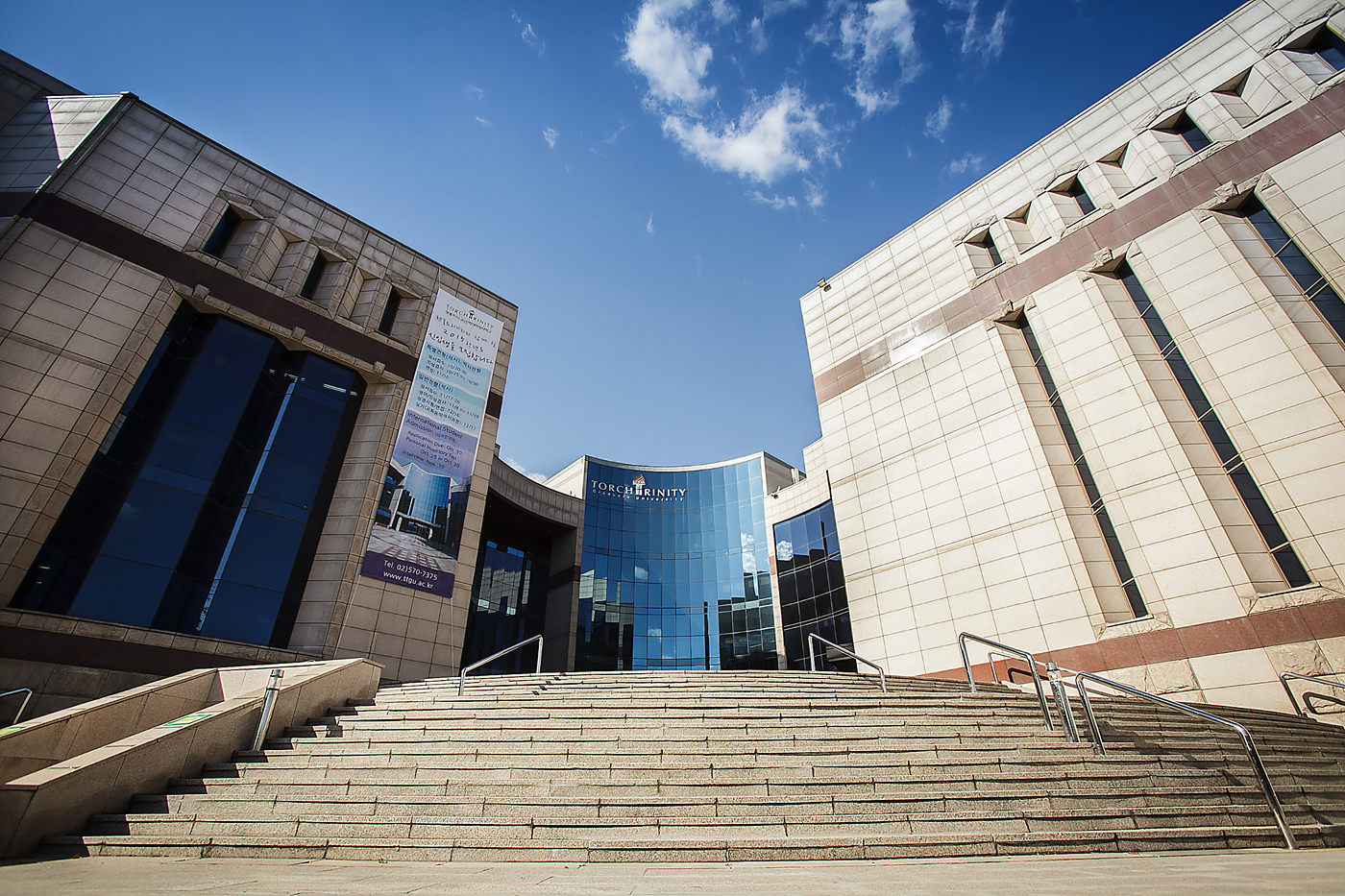
New Academic Building

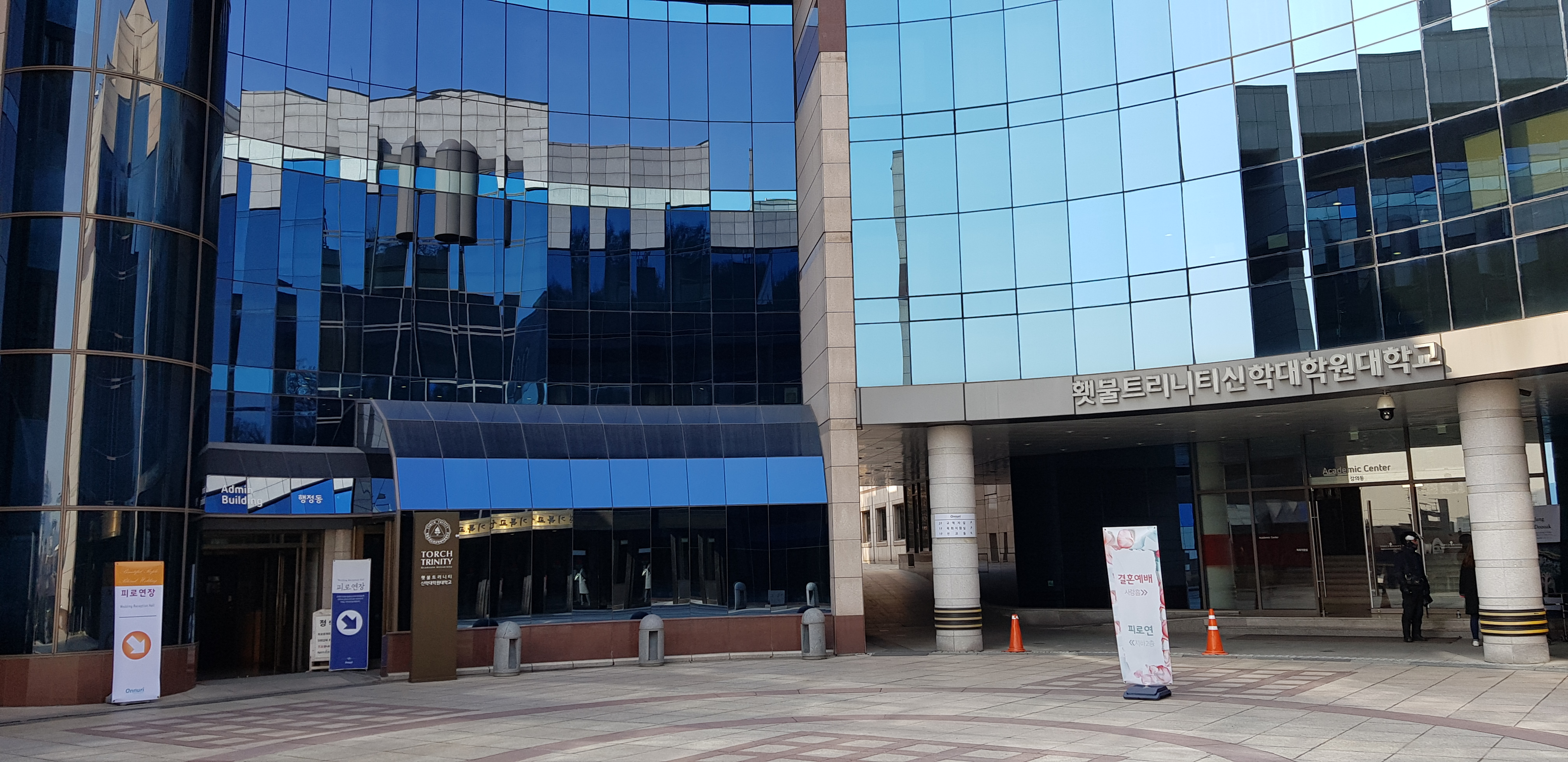
Torch Trinity Graduate University

Torch Trinity Graduate University (TTGU; Korean: 횃불트리니티신학대학원대학교) is an evangelical graduate school and seminary in Yangjae-dong, Seocho District, Seoul, South Korea. It was formerly called Torch Trinity Graduate School of Theology (TTGST). The university commits itself to the cause of Christian missions, with an emphasis on training future leaders of the church from all over the world.

== History ==
Torch Trinity Graduate University was established in 1997 through the partnership of the Korean Center for World Missions (Seoul, South Korea) and Trinity Evangelical Divinity School (Deerfield, IL). Torch Trinity first opened its doors in 1998 with the purpose of educating, equipping, and sending Christian leaders and missionaries worldwide.

Originally named Torch Trinity Graduate School of Theology (TTGST), the establishment of the school was pioneered by Hyung Ja Lee. She was installed as the school's chairperson in 1997 and still holds this office today. Since its establishment, Torch Trinity has had six presidents. Deok Kyo Oh (2023–present), Yoon Hee Kim (2019–2023), Jung-Sook Lee (2015–2019), Sang Bok David Kim (1997–2001, 2011–2015), Kenneth M. Meyer (2001–2005), and Yong Jo Ha (2005–2011).

After the sudden passing of President Ha, the founding president, Sang Bok David Kim, was reappointed as the fourth president (2011–2015). Under his leadership, the school changed its English appellation to Torch Trinity Graduate University to reflect a more accurate translation of the school's Korean name and added the Academic Building with new classrooms. Jung Sook Lee, the former vice president of Academic Development, was installed as the fifth president on September 1, 2015.

Torch Trinity is an evangelical, interdenominational institution. The Torch Trinity student body is drawn from the traditions of various Protestant denominations including Reformed/Presbyterian, Baptist, Independent Bible, Methodist, Pentecostal, and Episcopalian. Currently, there are over five hundred students enrolled at Torch Trinity from over thirty countries.[4] [5] The school offers six degree programs instructed by twenty-one full-time professors and thirteen adjuncts, each of whom holds a doctoral degree from an accredited school. Students can choose to join either the English or Korean language programs.

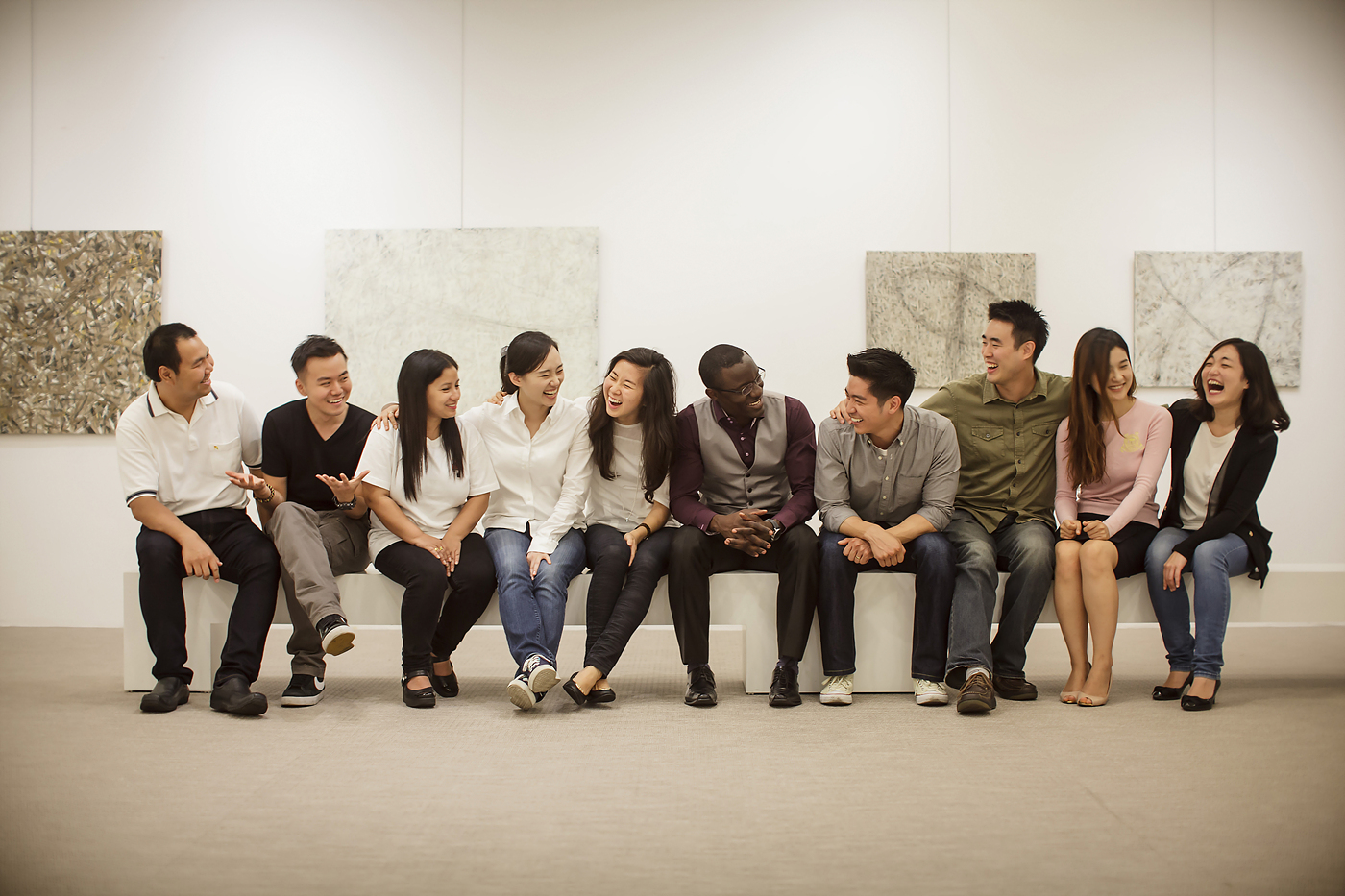
Art Gallery Opening

== Aims ==
Strategic Mission Education and Adaptive Education: The school has adopted the "Strategic Mission and Adaptive Education" plan to meet four areas of the church today:

- Mission Fields
- Korean Churches
- Foreign Residents in Korea
- Foreign Nationals of Korean Descent

Torch Trinity scholarships are given to students who help fulfill the school's aims. One of the most sought after scholarships includes the Torch Strategic Mission Scholarship (TSMS) which includes full tuition, room and board. Here, recipients are from the Majority World and they are called to serve in their respective countries upon graduation. TSMS is an integral part of Torch Trinity's mission to train and equip Christian leaders for those regions least penetrated by the gospel.

Angel Projects: Between semesters, members of the faculty take groups of students to visit alumni. These trips are called Angel Projects. Professors often give seminars on their specialized topics while students are able to learn first-hand how Christians propagate the gospel in a global context. Torch Trinity endeavors to stay connected to its graduates for mutual edification and to better learn how to meet the needs of Christians abroad.

== Academics ==
=== Degree programs ===
Torch Trinity offers six degree programs: M.Div., MEd, MA (in Christian Counseling and in Christian Education), MTS, Th.M., and Ph.D. Both Korean citizens and foreign/international students can apply. Expatriates living in Korea can also apply for a degree program as part-time students (if they apply full-time, they will be categorized as internationals). Torch Trinity holds classes during the day and evening. The following degrees and tracks are taught in English:

The Master of Divinity (M.Div.) is a 3-year program that prepares graduates for pastoral, preaching, and teaching ministries either in the church or in the mission field. It offers a comprehensive study of the Bible, including the biblical languages (Hebrew and Greek), theology, church history, preaching and practical ministry, mission and evangelism, Christian education, and Christian counseling. The M.Div. is the minimum degree for ordination in most denominations and for entry into Ph.D. or Th.D. programs in theological studies.

The Master of Education (MEd) is a 2-year program for full-time students and is geared for students who wish to work in primary or secondary schools. It has two tracks: Instruction and Administration. MEd students can also earn ACSI certification.

The Master of Arts (MA) is a 2-year program designed to prepare graduates for professional ministry in either education or counseling. Both Christian Counseling and Christian Education programs fall under this degree. The MA begins with biblical and theological foundations and ends with practical/clinical training and experience. Writing a thesis is optional.

The Master of Theological Studies (MTS) is a 2-year program designed to provide a comprehensive survey of biblical studies, theology, and church history. Applied studies are available as electives. The MTS does not require biblical languages (Hebrew and Greek) or preaching. This degree does not usually qualify students for pastoral ordination.

The Master of Theology (Th.M.) is a 2-year advanced program for M.Div. graduates to develop a high degree of competency in a specific field of specialization. Concentrations are available from all departments except Counseling. The degree is often viewed as a stepping-stone for doctoral studies and is thus ideal for a more rigorous and academic study of a specific area of biblical, theological, historical, or applied studies. The ThM program requires either a thesis or two major academic papers. Doctoral programs more readily accept Th.M. over M.Div. graduates.

The Doctor of Philosophy (Ph.D.) is a research terminal degree. Torch Trinity offers doctorates in four areas: Biblical Studies, Theological/Historical studies, Intercultural Studies, and Educational Studies. The Ph.D. is a 3-year doctoral program for academic research, publication, and teaching ministries. Graduates will gain competence in a highly specialized area for the purpose of advanced research and publication as well as a comprehensive knowledge of the discipline for teaching at the undergraduate and postgraduate levels. The Ph.D. requires a rigorous doctoral dissertation.

=== Accreditation ===
Torch Trinity is accredited by the Ministry of Education, Science and Technology, which is the only accrediting agency in the Republic of Korea. Internationally, the school is accredited by the Asia Theological Association (ATA), an Asian accrediting body. Credits can be transferred in full to any school accredited by the Association of Theological Schools (ATS) in North America. Torch Trinity graduates have been accepted for doctoral programs in the United States and the United Kingdom.

Torch Trinity is also a member of the Korea Association of Accredited Theological Schools (KAATS). The U.S. military's G.I. Bill recognizes the school, allowing veterans to earn a graduate degree on the Korean peninsula. In addition, several members of Torch Trinity's alumni have become military chaplains.

=== Student awards and prizes ===
Among its student awards, the Torch Trinity awards a prize for Excellence in Preaching and a prize for Excellence in Writing in honor of the American theologian and author Frederick Buechner. A judging panel of faculty members and peers adjudicate the contest, and the prizes are awarded to those submissions that demonstrate excellence in these areas.

== Library ==
The Torch Trinity Library is the academic resource center for the school and provides abundant material for students to study and browse in a quiet, comfortable environment. Torch Trinity Library is one of the best theological libraries in Korea and now endeavors to become the best theological library in Asia.

The facility houses some 60,000 books, more than half in English, over 310 domestic and international periodicals, some 5,300 dissertations and theses, over 800 micro-form resources, as well as numerous audio, video, and CD-ROM resource. The library uses the Library of Congress Classification (LCC) system. The catalog is accessible through the online service at the Torch Trinity Library's website

== Faculty and Instructors ==
Faculty members have strong ministry experiences either as ordained leaders or as laity. In terms of academics, every full-time professor and lecturer has a doctoral degree from an accredited school recognized by each school's national government (100% doctoral rate for full-time members). In addition, most have been educated in at least two countries, earning a degree from each country. The international faculty consists of native Koreans, Korean-Americans, and non-Koreans.

In addition, the school hires part-time instructors. Students can take classes from any of the thirteen adjuncts, who also have doctorates. Renowned guest professors and researchers are invited to teach modular courses at the end of each semester. Some of these visiting professors may also stay on for a semester as visiting lecturers. Seminars are held throughout the school year by various guest speakers.

The school hires part-time English instructors to assist students who struggle with the English language. These part-time English instructors are fully versed in the English language both in speaking and writing, have prior English teaching experience, and have earned, in the minimum, M.Div. degrees.

== Chapel Services ==
Chapel is the centerpiece of worship, community, and spiritual life at Torch Trinity. Chapel services are held every Tuesday (English), Thursday (English & Korean), and Saturday (Korean). Students are required to attend two chapel services weekly, as well as participate in weekly small group meetings.

== Associations and Partnerships ==
Memberships and partnerships with external organizations include: the Overseas Council (OC), the International Council for Evangelical and Theological Education (ICETE), the Association of Christian Schools International (ACSI), the Association of Evangelical Theological Schools, and Refo 500.

== Location ==
Torch Trinity is located in Seoul, the capital city of the Republic of Korea.

Torch Trinity is easily accessible by public transportation.

By Subway: Take the orange line (3) or the red line (Shin Bundang) to Yangjae Station, exit at gate 9, and walk south for approximately 500 meters. At the next major intersection, turn right. Turn right at the first street and Torch Trinity is straight ahead about 200 meters.

By Bus: Green Bus: 08, 18, 19, 20, 4417, 4421, 4422, 4423, 4432, 5411 Blue Bus: 140, 400, 470, 471 Red Bus: 1550, 9100, 9200, 9300, 9400, 9404, 9405, 9406, 9408, 9409, 9410, 9411, 9412, 9503, 9700

The nearest major bus stop is named Korean Educational Development Institute (KEDI, 교육개발원입구)
