= Yangjae Citizen's Forest station =

Station of the Seoul Metropolitan Subway

D09 양재시민의 숲 (매헌) Yangjae Citizen's Forest (Maeheon)
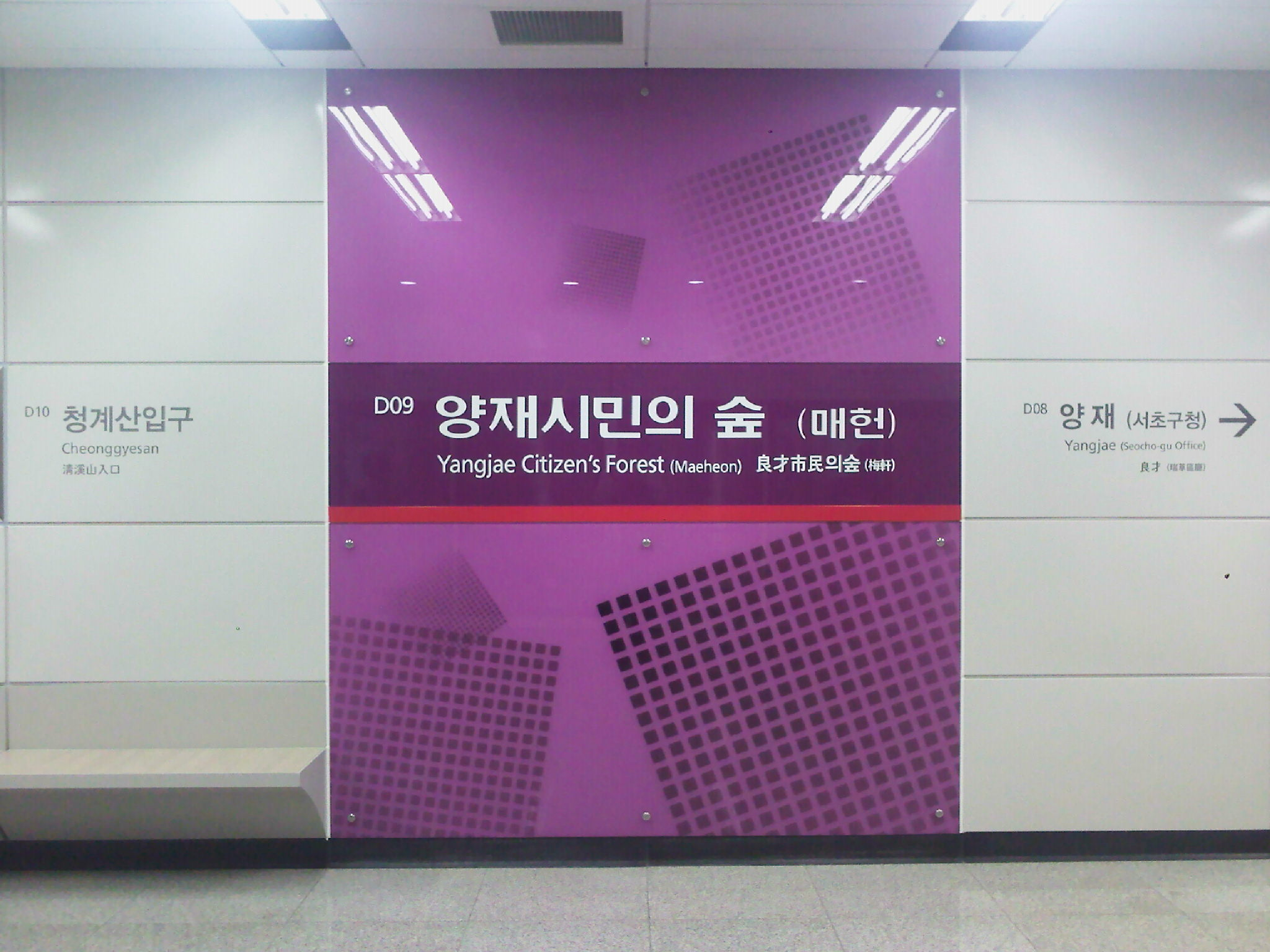

Korean name
- Hangul: 양재시민의 숲
- Hanja: 良才市民의숲
- Revised Romanization: Yangjaesiminuisup-yeok
- McCune–Reischauer: Yangjaesiminŭisup-yŏk

General information
- Location: 237 Yangjae-dong; Seocho-gu, Seoul
- Coordinates: 37.4699°N 127.0385°E
- Operator: Shinbundang Railroad Corporation
- Line: Shinbundang Line
- Platforms: 2
- Tracks: 2

Construction
- Structure type: Underground

Key dates
- October 28, 2011: Shinbundang Line opened
Location

Yangjae Citizen's Forest station is a subway station in Seoul, South Korea, on Seoul Metropolitan Subway's Shinbundang Line. It opened on October 28, 2011. The subway station appears in episode 1 of the Netflix TV show Squid Game where the main character Seong Gi-hun, played by actor Lee Jung-jae, is recruited into the death games.

== Naming ==
It is named after the nearby Yangjae Citizen's Forest which is located near Yangjae Tollgate on the Gyeongbu Expressway, the entrance to Seoul City.

=== Yangjae Stream ===
Yangjae Stream, or Yangjaecheon in Korean, is a 5.5 kilometres (3.4 mi; 3.0 nmi)—long body of water that stretches from Gwanaksan through the southern area of Gangnam station and Gangnam District. There are two swimming areas for kids, a number of stepping stone bridges to cross, and two sites for an ecosystem watch.

== Station layout ==
G	Street level	Exit
L1; Concourse	Lobby	Customer Service, Shops, Vending machines, ATMs
L2; Platform level	Side platform, doors will open on the left
L2; Platform level	Southbound	Shinbundang Line toward Gwanggyo (Cheonggyesan) →
L2; Platform level	Northbound	← Shinbundang Line toward Sinsa (Yangjae)
L2; Platform level	Side platform, doors will open on the left

== Exits ==
Five exits:

1. NW corner of Gangnam-daero and Maeheon-ro
2. NE corner of Gangnam-daero and Maeheon-ro
3. SE corner of Gangnam-daero and Maeheon-ro
4. SW corner of Gangnam-daero and Maeheon-ro
5. Maeheon-ro west of Gangnam-daero (the entrance of the forest)

Preceding station	Seoul Metropolitan Subway	Following station
Yangjae towards Sinsa	Shinbundang Line	Cheonggyesan towards Gwanggyo
