= Maebong station =

Train station in Seoul, South Korea

매봉; Maebong
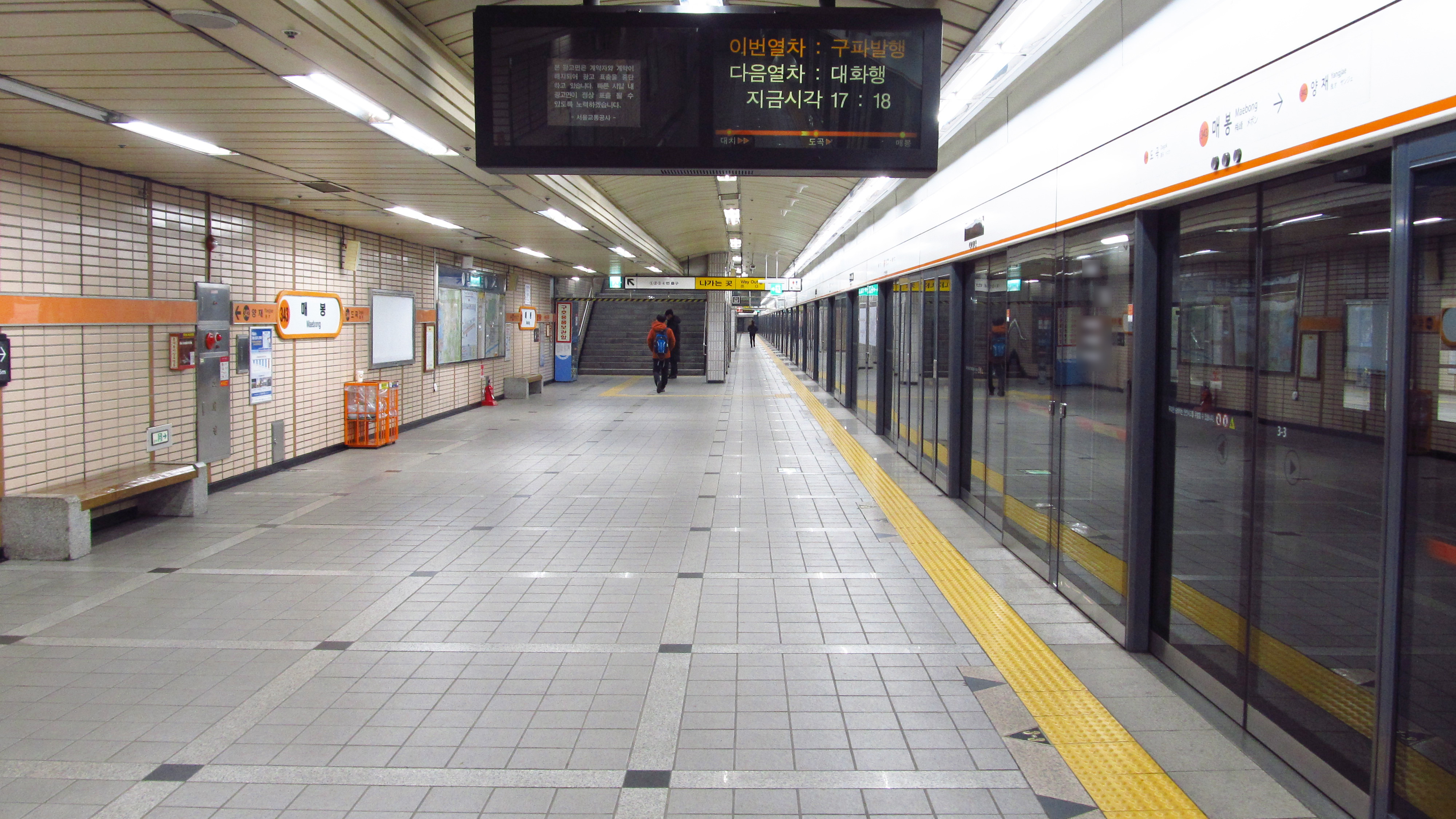

Korean name
- Hangul: 매봉역
- Hanja: 매봉驛
- Revised Romanization: Maebong-yeok
- McCune–Reischauer: Maebong-yŏk

General information
- Location: 179-2 Dogok-dong, 2744 Nambusunhwanno Jiha, Gangnam-gu, Seoul
- Coordinates: 37°29′13″N 127°02′48″E
- Operated by: Seoul Metro
- Line(s): Line 3
- Platforms: 2
- Tracks: 2

Construction
- Structure type: Underground

Key dates
- October 30, 1993: Line 3 opened

Passengers
- (Daily) Based on Jan-Dec of 2012. Line 3: 23,569

Maebong Station is a station on the Seoul Subway Line 3. It is located in Dogok-dong, Gangnam-gu, Seoul and was named after the nearby Maebongsan mountain.

== Station layout ==
G	Street level	Exit

L1; Concourse	Lobby	Customer Service, Shops, Vending machines, ATMs

L2; Platform	Side platform, doors will open on the right
L2; Platform	Northbound	← Line 3 toward Daehwa (Yangjae)
L2; Platform	Southbound	Line 3 toward Ogeum (Dogok) →
L2; Platform	Side platform, doors will open on the left

== Vicinity ==
- Exit 1 : Dogok Park
- Exit 2 : Maebong Tunnel, SK Leaders View APT
- Exit 3 : AsungDaiso, Hanshin APT, Yangjaecheon Stream
- Exit 4 : Daechi Middle School, Gaepo Lucky APT

Preceding station	Seoul Metropolitan Subway	Following station
Yangjae towards Daehwa	Line 3	Dogok towards Ogeum
