= Dogok-dong =

Neighborhood in Seoul, South Korea

Coordinates: 37°22′N 127°18′E

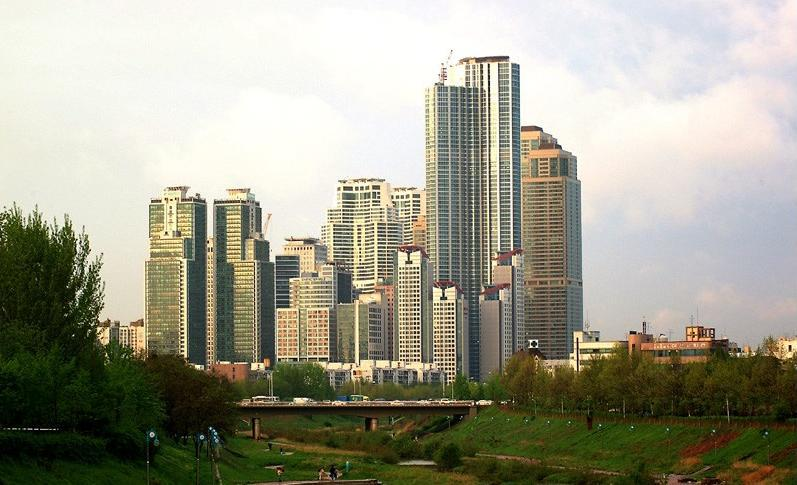
- Tower Palace is one of the tallest residential buildings in Seoul, South Korea

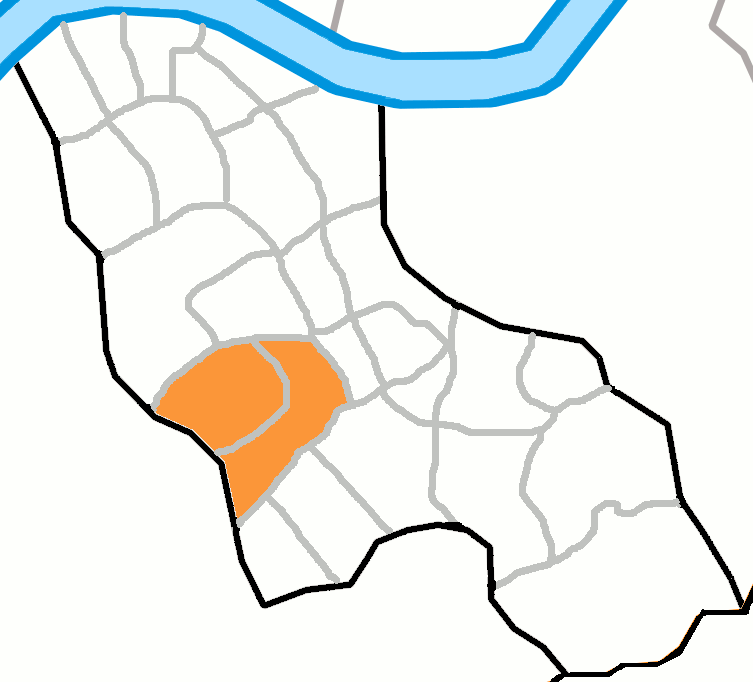
- Country: South Korea

Area
  - Total: 2.04 km^{2} (0.79 sq mi)

Population (2001)
  - Total: 40,111
  - Density: 19,662/km^{2} (50,920/sq mi)

Korean name
- Hangul: 도곡동
- Hanja: 道谷洞
- RR: Dogok-dong
- MR: Togok-tong

Dogok-dong (Korean: 도곡동) is an affluent ward of Gangnam District, Seoul, South Korea. It is home to high-end residential homes including the Samsung Tower Palace, a luxury residential complex which contains the eleventh-tallest building in South Korea.

== Education ==
Schools located in Dogok-dong:

- Eonju Elementary School
- Seoul Daedo Elementary School
- Daechi Middle School
- Dogok Middle School
- Eunseong Middle School
- Sookmyung Girls' Middle School
- Eunkwang Girls' High School
- Sookmyung Girls' High School
- Chungang University High School

== Transportation ==
Dogok-dong is served by Dogok Station and Hanti Station on the Line. It is also served by Maebong Station, Dogok Station and Yangjae Station on the Line 3 of the Seoul Subway.

== See also ==
- Yangjaecheon
- Samsung Tower Palace
- Dong of Gangnam District
