= Newstead Wood School =

Grammar school in Orpington, London, England

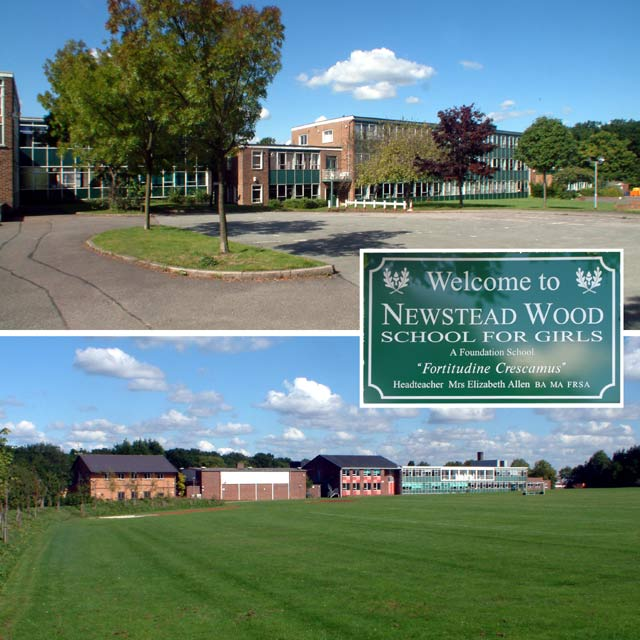

Location
- Avebury Road; Orpington, London, BR6 9SA; England; 51.367°N 0.077°E

Information
- Type: Grammar academy
- Motto: Fortitudine Crescamus ('May we grow in strength')
- Established: 1957
- Trust: United Learning
- Department for Education URN: 136551 Tables
- Ofsted: Reports
- Head teacher: Hannah Dalton
- Gender: Girls (mixed in the sixth form)
- Age: 11 to 18
- Enrolment: 1264
- Houses: Nightingale , Wren , Swift , Falcon , Griffin , Phoenix
- Website: https://www.newsteadwood.co.uk

Newstead Wood School is a selective girls' grammar school in Avebury Road, Orpington, south east London, England. The school has been admitting boys into the sixth form since 2012.

== Admissions ==
The school is a grammar school which admits girls in Year 7 based on the results of its own selection test. The current head teacher is Hannah Dalton. The school's motto is Fortitudine Crescamus (Latin for: 'May we grow in strength').

== History ==
The school was founded as Orpington Grammar School for Girls only in 1957, when administered by the Kent Education Committee. In 1965, as a result of the London Government Act 1963, the local area, and thus the school, came under the authority of the London Borough of Bromley. It was at this point that the school's name was changed to Newstead Wood School. Nearby Bullers Wood School became a comprehensive in the late 1970s, and most schools in the borough are now comprehensive. There were firm plans for Newstead Wood School to become comprehensive in 1978, but the school has remained one of the only two selective state schools in Bromley.

In 1997, a survey in the Sunday Times found that the school was the best value in England for each A or B grade achieved at A-level, second to St Olave's school; Bromley was a low spender (per pupil) comparative to other LEAs. In 2009 the headteacher told the conference in Harrogate of the Girls' Schools Association that schools were not concentrating on brighter pupils, instead trying to raise average pupils' grades from D to C, and that girls in mixed-sex schools can have their ambitions crushed and be held back in male-dominated professions (girls from single-sex schools are statistically more successful in science-based professions than from mixed schools). She also criticised a government scheme to give one-to-one tuition to less able pupils, and not more-able students, when considering the lack of women in traditionally-male occupations, and she claimed there was a 'huge reluctance' to concentrate on top students.

On 1 April 2011, the school gained academy status and is now sponsored by United Learning.

== Academic performance ==
At its last full inspection in 2022, Newstead Wood was rated by Ofsted as ‘Outstanding’. The school has a large catchment area of nine miles, from which pupils are selected on the basis of tests in verbal and non-verbal collective data.

The school was ranked third amongst secondary schools in Bromley based on overall performance at end of key stage 4 in 2019 - all pupils on the Progress 8 benchmark.

Times Parent Power has ranked the School's 2019 A-level results 121st in the country (previous year 161st) and 2019 GCSE results 11th (previous year 15th) and also ranks it 11th amongst all secondary schools in Greater London.

== Entrance examinations ==
There are currently two examinations required to gain a place at the school: verbal and non-verbal reasoning.

== Notable former pupils ==
- Dina Asher-Smith, athletics sprinter, multi Olympic and World Championship medallist
- Gemma Chan, actress known for her role as Astrid in Crazy Rich Asians, and as Anita/Mia on the television drama Humans
- Samantha Baines, actress and comedian
- Suzi Brent, blogger and author
- Leela Bunce
- Libby Jackson, space exploration expert, author and former controller and flight director for the Columbus Module, the European module of the International Space Station.
- Emma Johnson, clarinettist, winner of the 1984 BBC Young Musician of the Year, and Bronze in the Eurovision Young Musicians 1984
- Liv Little, Editor in Chief and Founder of gal-dem magazine
- Josie Long, comedian
- Kim Medcalf, actress who played Sam Mitchell (EastEnders) from 2002 to 2005 and from 2022 onwards
- Emma Raducanu, British tennis player and 2021 US Open Champion
- Josephine Vander Gucht - part of the pop duo Oh Wonder
- Barbara Harriss-White, Professor of Development Studies at the University of Oxford

=== Orpington Grammar School for Girls ===
- Christine Hancock, general secretary from 1989 to 2001 of the Royal College of Nursing
