= Korea Baseball Organization =

South Korean baseball governing body

- Abbreviation: KBO
- Formation: December 1981; March 1982 (League launched)
- Type: Sport governing body
- Legal status: Active
- Purpose: Managing the KBO League and KBO Futures League, and governing the professional national team.
- Headquarters: Gangnam, Seoul, South Korea
- Location: 946-16, Dogok-dong, Gangnam-gu, Seoul, South Korea
- Region served: Domestic
- Members: Baseball Federation of Asia, World Baseball Softball Confederation
- Official language: Korean
- Commissioner: Chung Un-chan
- Website: http://eng.koreabaseball.com

- Korea Baseball Organization
- Hangul: 한국야구위원회
- Hanja: 韓國野球委員會
- RR: Hanguk yagu wiwonhoe
- MR: Han'guk yagu wiwŏnhoe

The Korea Baseball Organization (KBO; Korean: 한국야구위원회) is the governing body for the professional leagues of baseball in South Korea. The KBO was founded in 1981 and has governed two leagues: the KBO League (KBO 리그) and KBO Futures League (KBO 퓨처스리그 (farm league)) since 1982. It is one of two major baseball governing bodies; the other is the Korea Baseball Association (대한야구협회), which is the governing body for amateur baseball competitions.

The KBO is a member of the International Baseball Federation (IBAF), and is responsible for the national baseball team for the World Baseball Classic and Asia Series. National team participation in other competitions is governed by the Korea Baseball Association.

== Awards ==
See Baseball awards#South Korea

- KBO League MVP Award
- KBO League Rookie of the Year Award
- KBO League Golden Glove Award
- KBO League Korean Series MVP Award
- KBO League All-Star Game MVP
- Korean Series Most Valuable Player Award

== See also ==
- Baseball in Korea
- KBO League, the highest level professional baseball league in Korea
