= Eunkwang Girls' High School =

Eunkwang Girls' High School 은광여자고등학교
- 36 Nambusunhwan-ro 359-gil, Gangnam-gu; Seoul; South Korea

Information
- Type: Private
- Opened: 1946
- Gender: Girls

Eunkwang Girls' High School (Korean: 은광여자고등학교; Hanja: 恩光女子高等學校) is a private girls high school located in Gangnam District, Seoul, South Korea.

== Foundation ==
Eunkwang High School and Eunkwang Middle School, two co-educational schools, were established by Kang-Mok Lee in 1946 under the spirit of Christianity. In 1973, the name was changed to Eunkwang Girls' High School and Eunkwang Girls' Middle School. The educational foundation for both schools was named Eunkwang Private Educational Institute. This name was also changed to Kuk-Am Private Educational Institute.

== Symbols ==
The school's motto is "adventurous man of the future world, creative intellectual, independent volunteer". The school's flower is Korean rosebay, and the tree is pine.

== Academic information ==
Entering their sophomore year, students are to choose between liberal arts courses and general science courses. The classes are divided according to their selection of subjects. All students are required to learn at least one other foreign language than English, and students need to decide between Chinese or Japanese.
