= Randall Kenan Prize =

Literary award for Black LGBT authors

The Randall Kenan Prize for Black LGBTQ Fiction is an annual literary award presented by the Lambda Literary Foundation, established in 2021 in honor of Randall Kenan. The award is presented "to a Black LGBTQ writer whose fiction explores themes of Black LGBTQ life, culture, and/or history." Nominees "must have published at least one book and show promise in continuing to produce groundbreaking work." Winners receive a $3,000 cash prize.

== Recipients ==
Year	Recipient	Ref.
2021	Ana-Maurine Lara	
2022	Kalynn Bayron	
2023	Eboni J. Dunbar	
2024	Liv Little	
2025	Allen R. Wells	
