= Leela Bunce =

British media personality (born 1980)

- Born: Leela Bunce; 17 December 1980 (age 45); Petts Wood, London, United Kingdom
- Occupation: TV Personality
- Years active: 2005–present

Leela Bunce (born 17 December 1980) is an English television personality, the director of the ShineTime organisation, and a regular on the chatshow and radio circuit. She is a Laughter Yoga facilitator and member of the Laughter Network. Her background is in drama, dance, counselling, meditation, teaching, and clowning.

== Biography ==
Born in Petts Wood, London on 17 December 1980, Bunce completed her A-level studies at Newstead Wood School for Girls. She became a Laughter Yoga facilitator after suffering back problems for many years. Bunce is a TV and radio host, appearing on ITV's This Morning & Loose Women, Chris Evans' Drivetime show on Radio 2, BBC1's The Science of the Young Ones, BBC2's Frank Skinner's Opinionated and comedian Rob Rouse's forthcoming TV show Rob's Odd Jobs, and acting as laughter consultant on Spine TV's Mystro Investigates and Skate Nation for CBBC.

Bunce is also a clown who has appeared in many shows in London, around the UK and in Italy. She is currently working on her first solo clown show entitled Waiting For Stanley.
