= Yangjae Citizen's Forest =

Park in Seoul, South Korea

Maeheon Citizen's Forest
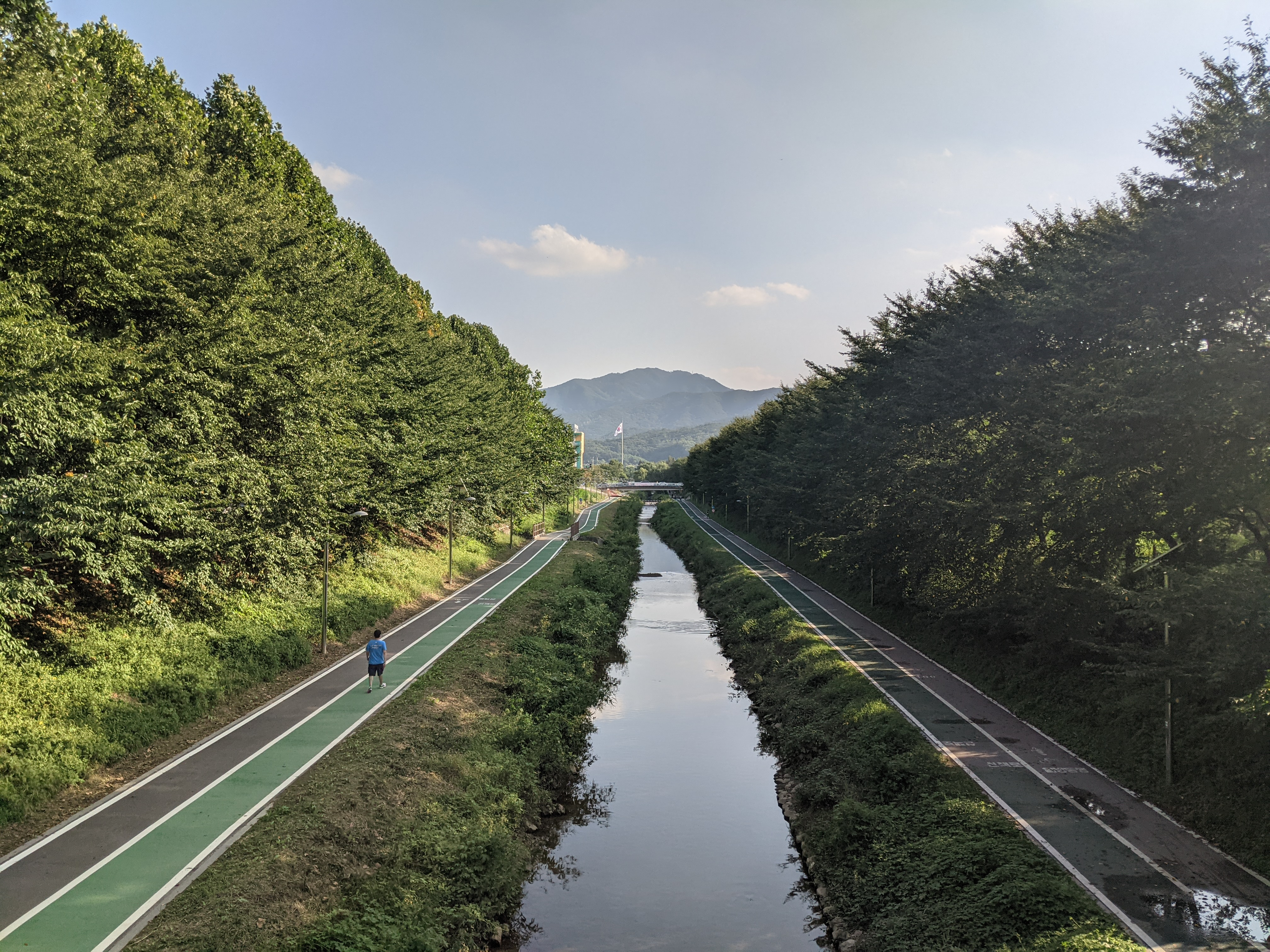
- Walking paths in the park in 2021
- Interactive map of Maeheon Citizen's Forest
- Location: 236 Yangjae 2-dong, Seocho District, Seoul, South Korea
- Area: 358,991 m^{2} (88.709 acres)
- Opened: November 30, 1986
- Website: parks.seoul.go.kr/template/sub/citizen.do (in Korean)

Korean name
- Hangul: 매헌시민의숲
- Revised Romanization: Maeheon Siminui Sup
- McCune–Reischauer: Maehŏn Siminŭi Sup

Previous name
- Hangul: 양재시민의숲
- Revised Romanization: Yangjae Siminui Sup
- McCune–Reischauer: Yangjae Siminŭi Sup

Yangjae Citizen's Forest (Korean: 양재시민의숲) is a park in Seocho District, Seoul, South Korea. The park's official name is now Maeheon Citizen's Forest, which it adopted in October 2022.

Admission is free of charge. The park is around 200 metres (660 ft) from exit 1 of Yangjae Citizen's Forest station, and has parking for 571 cars.

"Maeheon" is the art name of the Korean independence activist Yun Bong-gil. Yun is hailed as a martyr in South Korea for his role in the 1932 Hongkou Park Incident, in which he assassinated and injured prominent Japanese colonial and military leadership, and was subsequently executed. The Yun Bong-gil Memorial Hall is also in the park.

Built for the 1986 Asian Games and 1988 Seoul Olympics, the land was prepared in July 1983 as part of Gaepo-dong Land Arrangement Plan. The construction of the Forest continued for about three years and completed on November 30, 1986. The total area is 358,992 square metres (88.709 acres). The park's major facilities include landscaped facilities, such as Grass Field, Octagonal Pavilion, and Pagora (wisteria trellis). The forest also has sports facilities, such as tennis and basketball courts. Other major structures include a parking lot, children's playground, and an outdoor wedding hall. The park also has a number of memorials honouring civilian deaths, including the bombing of Korean Air Flight 858 that killed 115 and the Sampoong Department Store collapse in 1995 that killed 502.

== Gallery ==
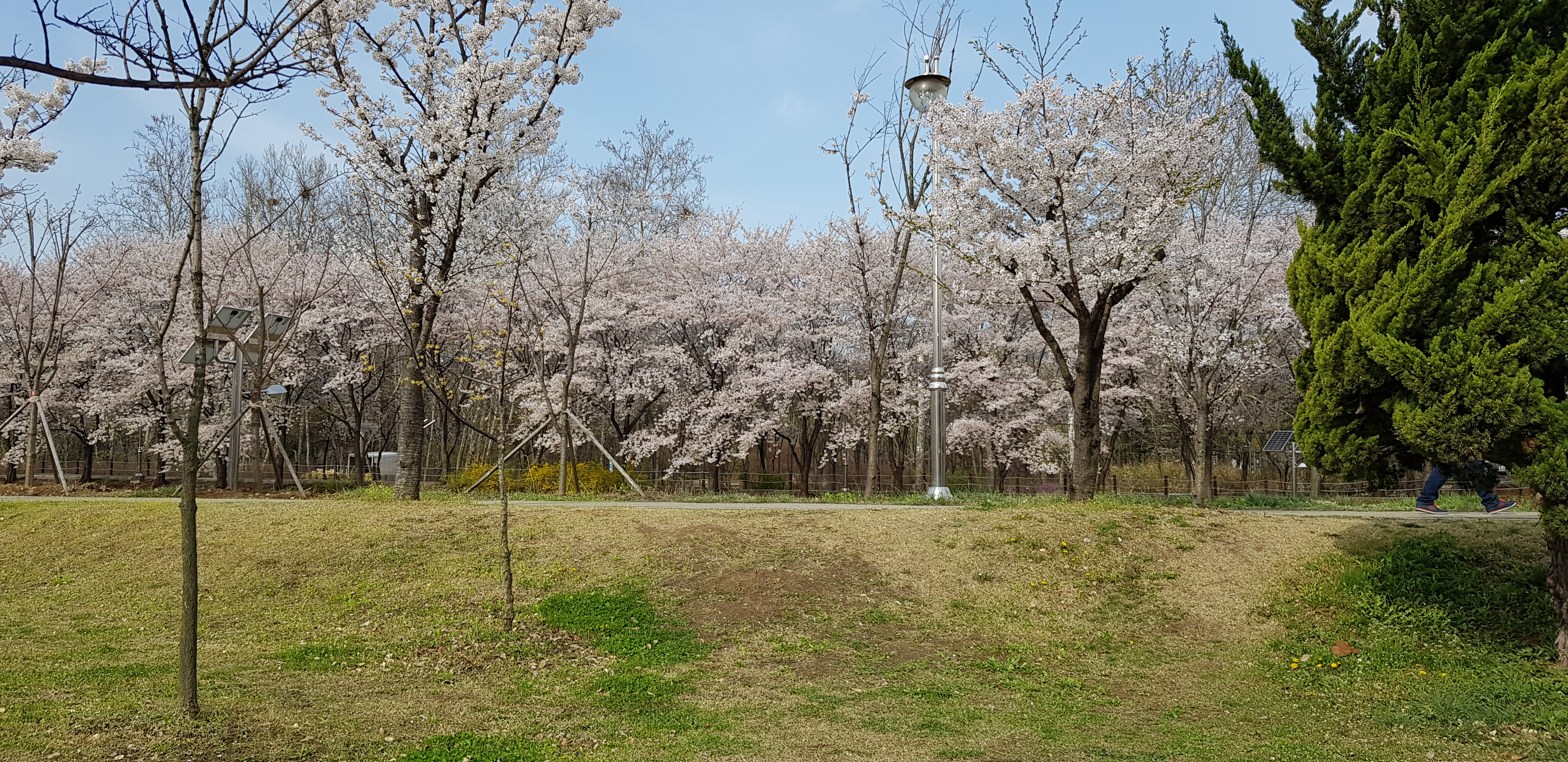
Cherry blossoms in bloom (April 2018)

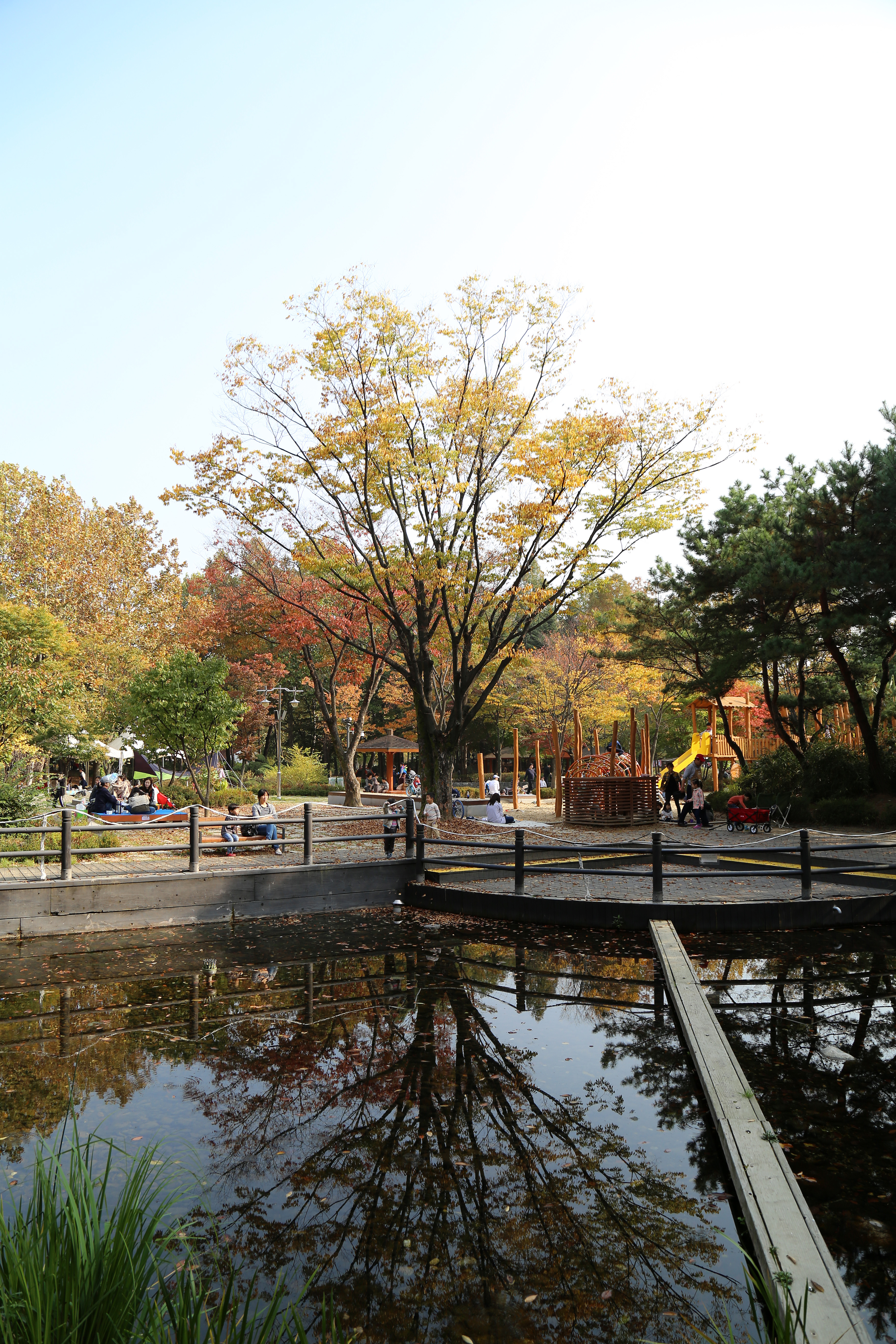
Children playing in the park (2014)

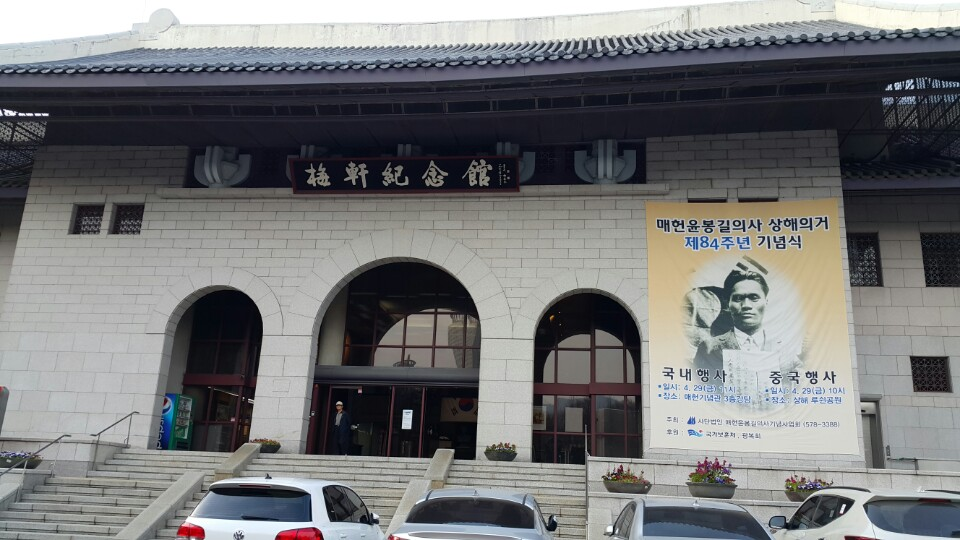
Yun Bong-gil Memorial Hall (2016)

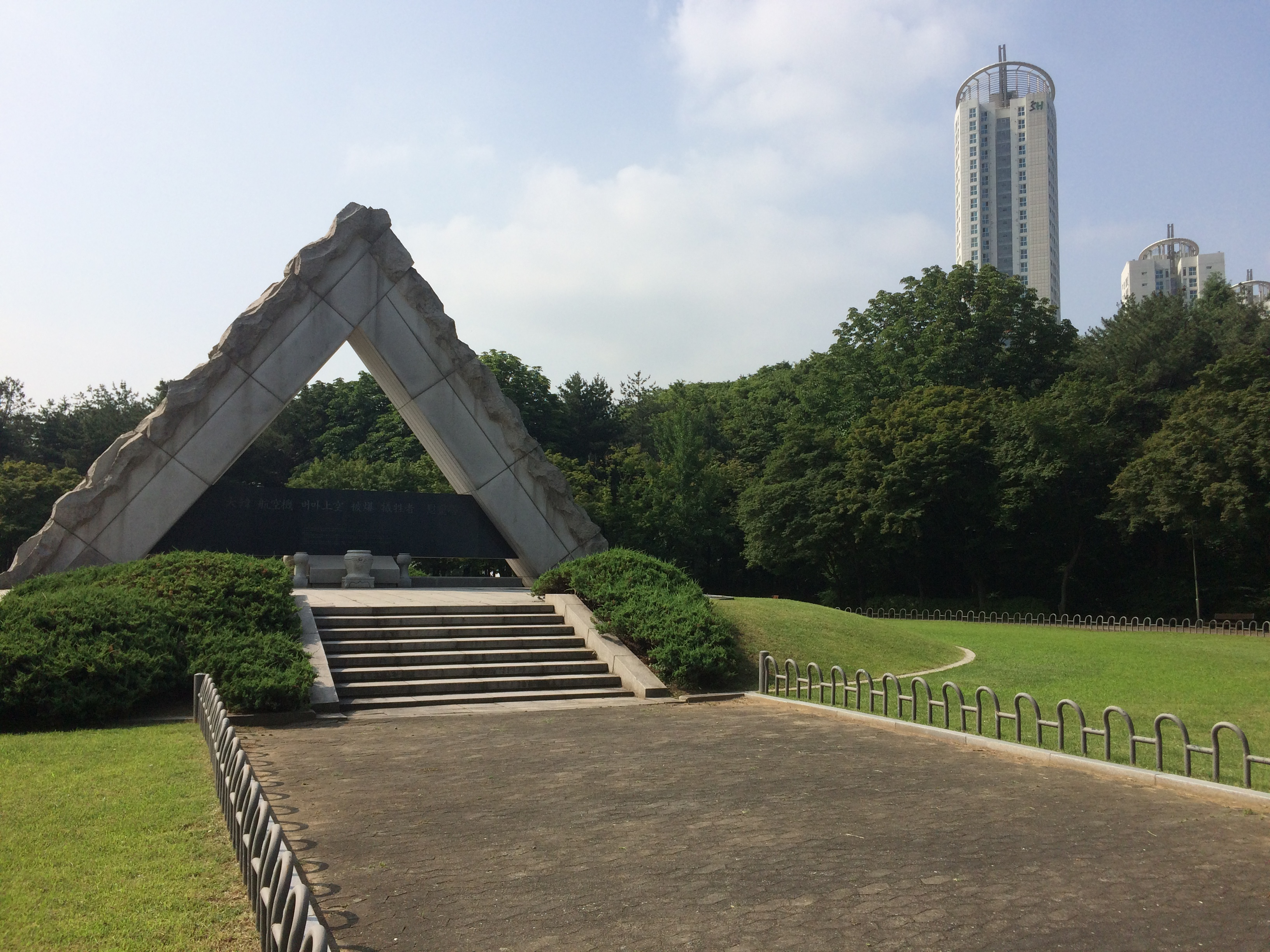
Korean Air Flight 858 Memorial (2017)
