= Rosebay =

Rosebay is a common name for several plants

Rosebay may refer to:

- Nerium oleander, a shrub in the family Apocynaceae, native to the Mediterranean region and cultivated in other warm subtropical areas
- Chamerion angustifolium, a herbaceous plant in the family Onagraceae, commonly known as rosebay willowherb in Britain
- Rhododendron, a genus of shrubs in the family Ericaceae, sometimes referred to by the common name rosebay in the United States

== See also ==
- Rose Bay (disambiguation), places named Rose Bay
