= Yangjaecheon =

Stream in Seoul, South Korea

Coordinates: 37°30′N 127°04′E

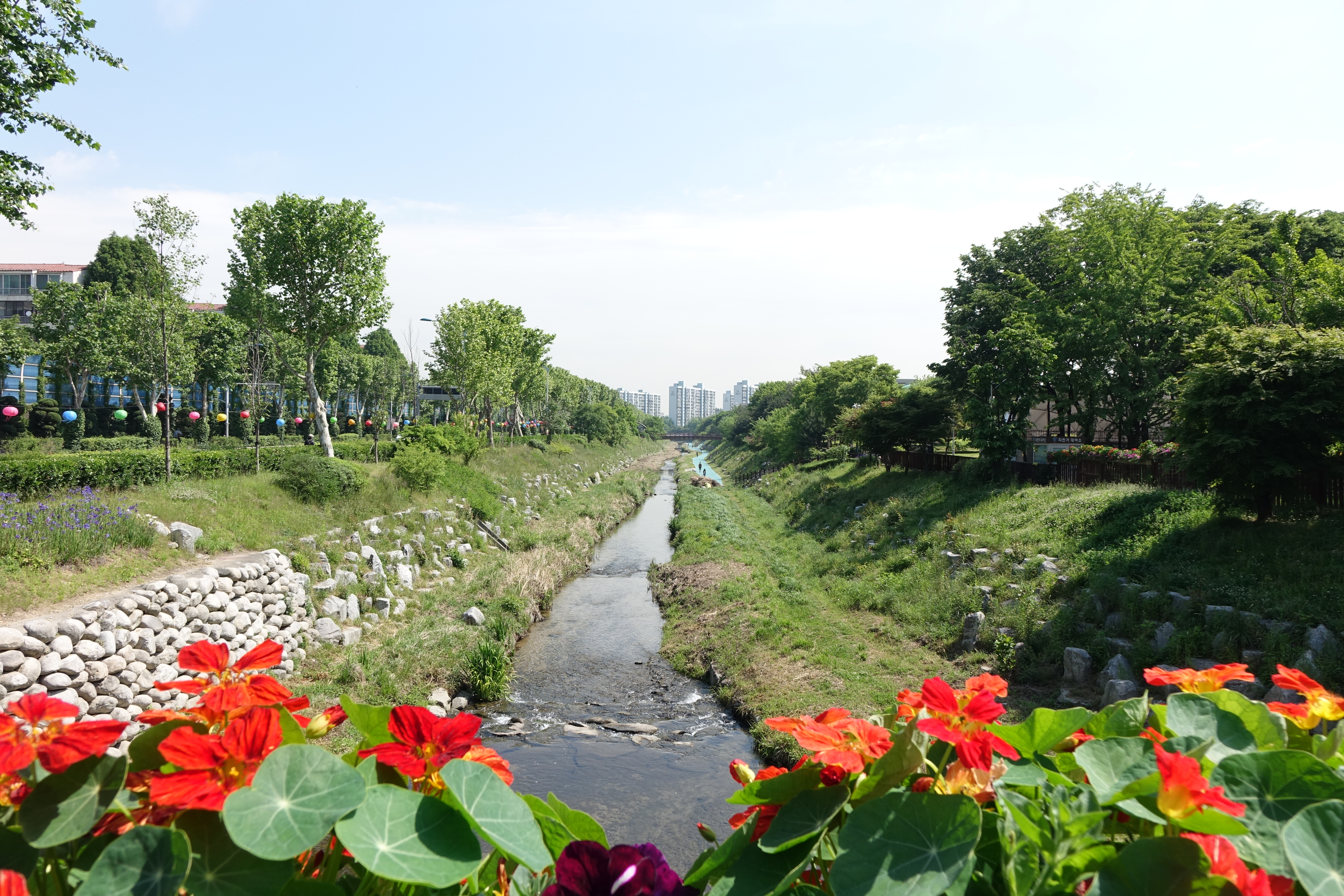
- Part of the stream (2015)

Seoul Future Heritage
- Reference no.: 2015-025

Korean name
- Hangul: 양재천
- Hanja: 良才川
- RR: Yangjaecheon
- MR: Yangjaech'ŏn

Yangjaecheon (Korean: 양재천) is a stream that flows through the city of Seoul, South Korea. It runs through Gangnam, which is part of the southern half of the city. Yangjaecheon is a greenway stretching five and a half kilometres from Gwanaksan in Gyeonggi through the Seocho, Gangnam, and Songpa districts until it feeds into the Tancheon.

The stream is recessed, with major and minor roads above it on bridges and multiple parallel bike and pedestrian trails flanking it on tiered ledges. Public exercise equipment is provided along the stream, as well as benches and a variety of flowers. 3.75 km of the stream was appointed as Seoul Future Heritage.

== Course ==
The stream flows from Gyeonggi Province into Seoul through different districts. It has a total length of 15.6 km. Its course is shown below:

- Gwacheon; 8.4 km
- Seoul
- Seocho District; 3.7 km
  - Yangjae-dong
- Gangnam District; 3.5 km
  - Dogok-dong
  - Daechi 3-dong
  - Irwon 2-dong
- Songpa District
  - Jamsil-dong
- Tancheon

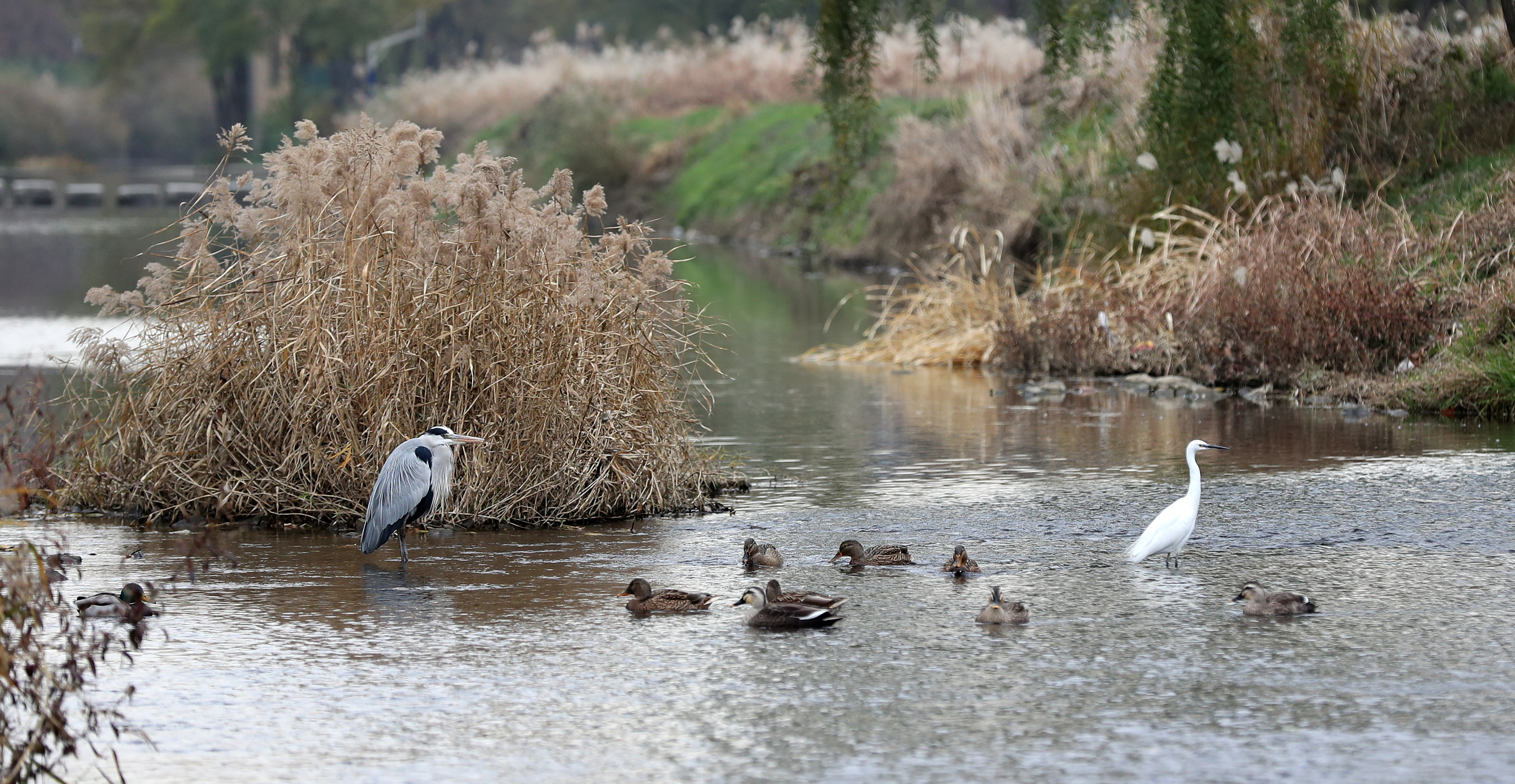
Ducks and other birds

== Ecosystem ==
There are 174 species of plants, 42 species of birds, 20 species of fish, six species of mammals, and six species of amphibians and reptiles in the Yangjaecheon. The Yangjaecheon Ecological Park, aiming to restore the ecosystem, revived the river's natural state by restoring the riverside slope to create a resting and walking space. Concrete revetments were replaced and reconstructed using megaliths, trees, grasses and natural materials. The vegetation revetments act as safeguards against floods and control the water temperature by creating shade. The Yangjaecheon also provides fish and algae habitats to help maintain the food chain of aquatic ecosystems. It also precipitates and absorbs water and pollutants, easing eutrophication.

== Tales related to Yangjaecheon ==
Yangjaecheon has a tale related to the Guryongsan mountain. The Guryongsan has nine valleys, nine peaks, and nine wells. The name Guryong comes from 'nine dragons'. The highest peak of the Guryongsan is named Guksoobong, which means 'a mountain peak that protects the country'. According to the tale, the mountain originally had ten valleys, with each dragon in one valley. They had to ascend to the sky, but one was late and was seen by a person, so it was unable to ascend. By the rules of good conduct, he had to be a stream for people to drink and farm. The stream made people wealthier and happier, which was why this stream was later named Yangjaecheon. Yangjae is a word written in Chinese characters, which is translated as 'a group of talented people.'

== Yangjaecheon's development ==
The Yangjaecheon was originally the first tributary of the Han River. However, it was an artificially created river, so it began to flow into the Tancheon watershed. In the 1970s, the land consolidation project in the Gaepo-dong area intensely polluted Yangjaecheon. After that, pollution became much worse with the rapid increase in population. In order to improve the ecological environment of Yangjaecheon, a natural river system was used for the first time in urban river. From 1995 to 2000, organizations restored water quality to more than 2 grade by removing concrete from both shores for and constructing a vegetation shore, water purification facility, bicycle road and eco-experience center. As a result of these efforts, the Yangjaecheon was selected by the Ministry of Environment in 2005 as an excellent ecological restoration river.

== Geographical location of Yangjaecheon ==
The Yangjaecheon starts from the Gwanaksan mountain in Gwacheon. It flows through Gwacheon street and joins with the Makgyecheon, and in Seocho, it joins with the Yeouicheon. The Makgyecheon and Yeouicheon are small streams that start from Cheonggyesan. Finally, it flows through Gangnam District and runs into the Tancheon. The total length of Yangjaecheon is 15.6 km. Gwacheon manages 8.4 km, Seocho District manages 3.7 km, and Gangnam District manages 3.5 km. The width of the Yangjaecheon varies from 6–13 m.

== Facilities ==
=== Bridges ===
- Gwanak Bridge; 관악교
- Gwanmun Bridge; 관문교
- Byeoryang Bridge; 별양교
- Burim Bridge 1; 부림1교
- Burim Bridge 2; 부림2교
- Gwacheon Bridge; 과천교
- Yangjaecheon Bridge; 양재천교
- Juam Bridge; 주암교
- Umyeon Bridge; 우면교
- Yeongdong Bridge 1; 영동1교
- Yeongdong Bridge 2; 영동2교
- Yeongdong Bridge 3; 영동3교
- Yeongdong Bridge 4; 영동4교
- Yeongdong Bridge 5; 영동5교
- Yeongdong Bridge 6; 영동6교
- Daechi Bridge; 대치교

=== Wetlands ===
- Rice farming field: open to urban students and citizens. During the agricultural off-season, it is used as an ice sledding field.
- Two swimming pools: one is located near Yeongdong Bridge 3, and the other is located between Yeongdong bridges 4 and 5, near Dogok station.
- Water purification facility: located between Yeongdong bridges 2 and 3. It uses gravel contact oxidation to maintain the BOD 1~3 ppm. It can purify 32,000 m^{3} of water per day.

== See also ==
- Rivers of Korea
