= Cheonggyesan station =

Metro station in Seoul, South Korea

Coordinates: 37.4465°N 127.0565°E

D10 청계산입구 Cheonggyesan
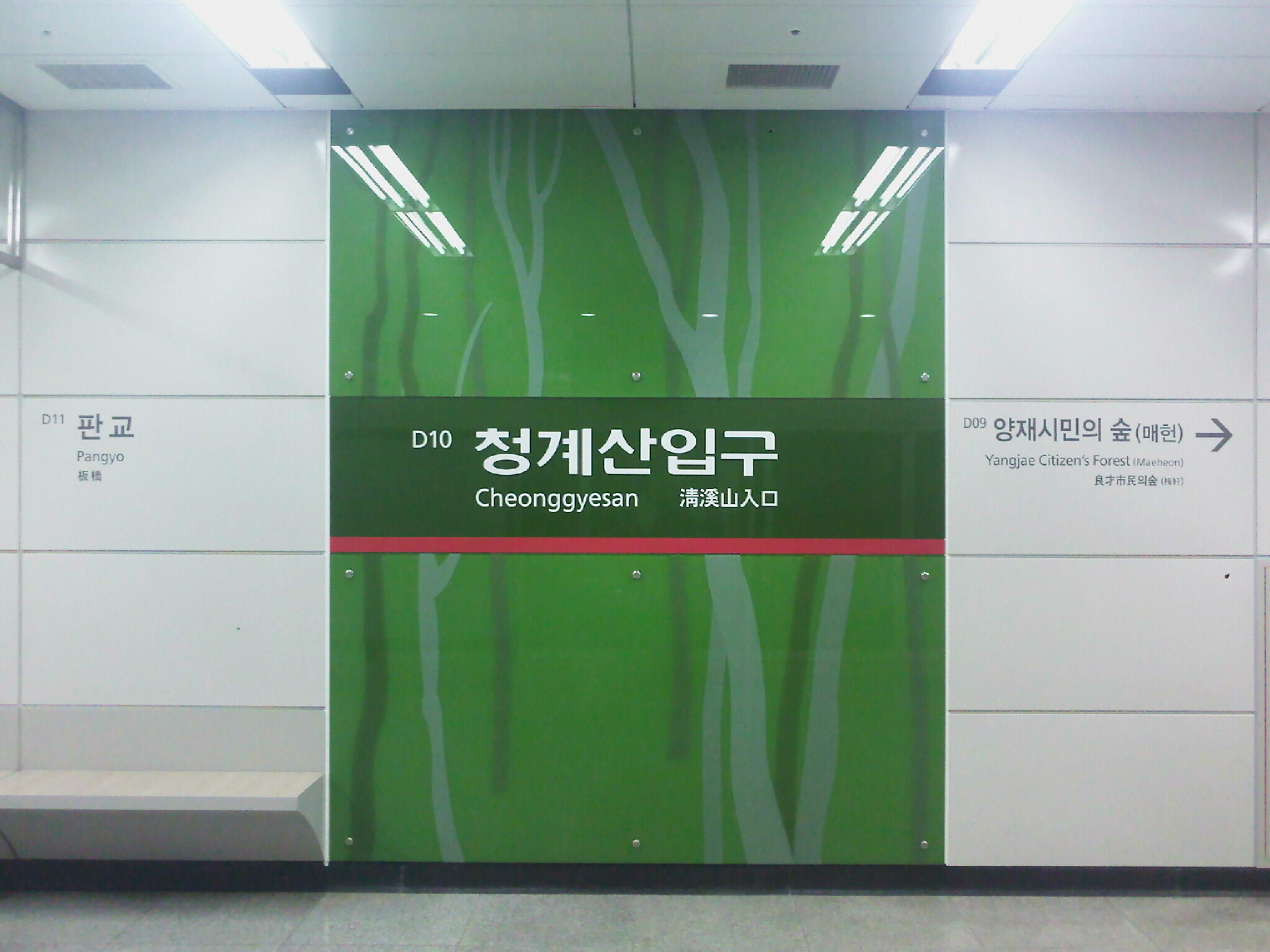
- Station wall

Korean name
- Hangul: 청계산입구
- Hanja: 淸溪山入口
- Revised Romanization: Cheonggyesan-ipgu-yeok
- McCune–Reischauer: Ch'ŏnggyesan-ipgu-yŏk

General information
- Location: 270 Sinwon-dong; Seocho-gu, Seoul
- Operator: Shinbundang Railroad Corporation
- Line: Shinbundang Line
- Platforms: 2
- Tracks: 2

Construction
- Structure type: Underground

Key dates
- October 28, 2011: Shinbundang Line opened
Location

Cheonggyesan Station is a railway station in Seoul, South Korea, on the Seoul Metropolitan Subway-operated Shinbundang Line. It opened on October 28, 2011.

There is a light display between Cheonggysean Station and Pangyo Station.

== Station layout ==
G	Street level	Exit
L1; Concourse	Lobby	Customer Service, Shops, Vending machines, ATMs
L2; Platform level	Side platform, doors will open on the left
L2; Platform level	Southbound	Shinbundang Line toward Gwanggyo (Pangyo) →
L2; Platform level	Northbound	← Shinbundang Line toward Sinsa (Yangjae Citizen's Forest)
L2; Platform level	Side platform, doors will open on the left

== Exits ==
Two exits:

1. East side of Cheonggyesan-ro
2. West side of Cheonggyesan-ro

Preceding station	Seoul Metropolitan Subway	Following station
Yangjae Citizen's Forest towards Sinsa	Shinbundang Line	Pangyo towards Gwanggyo
