= Rosewater (Little novel) =

2023 debut novel by Liv Little

- Author: Liv Little
- Language: English
- Genre: Fiction
- Publisher: Dialogue
- Publication date: 2023
- ISBN: 978-0349702957

Rosewater is the debut novel of Liv Little, published in 2023.

Writing in The Observer, Yagnishsing Dawoor described it as "a beautiful ode to queer love and friendship".
