= Gal-dem =

Independent British online and print magazine

gal-dem
- Frequency: One per year
- Format: Online and print magazine
- Publisher: Independent
- Founder: Liv Little
- Founded: 2015; 11 years ago
- Final issue: 31 March 2023
- Country: United Kingdom
- Based in: London
- Website: gal-dem.com
- ISSN: 2517-6242
- OCLC: 1063662695

gal-dem was an independent British online and print magazine produced by women of colour and non-binary people of colour. Founded in 2015, it ceased publication in 2023.

== History and profile ==
The magazine was founded by Liv Little in 2015. The website has six content sections: arts, lifestyle, music, news, opinion, and politics. In addition to its online format, it produced one printed issue a year. The first print issue, "the gal-hood issue", sold out its print run of 1,000 copies; the second, "the home issue", was planned to have a print run of 3,000 and also sold out.

In 2016, the gal-dem editorial collective curated an event at the Victoria and Albert Museum as part of its Friday Lates series. It showcased work by contemporary young artists of colour and was described in The Guardian as "nothing short of breathtaking".

In August 2018, the gal-dem team guest-edited an issue of The Guardian's Weekend magazine.

In June 2019 gal-dem released the book "I Will Not Be Erased": Our Stories About Growing Up As People of Colour, an anthology from some of the women and non-binary people of colour who write for the magazine.

In March 2023, gal-dem announced it was ceasing publication for financial reasons.
