= Dogok station =

Train station in Seoul, South Korea

도곡; Dogok
도곡; Dogok
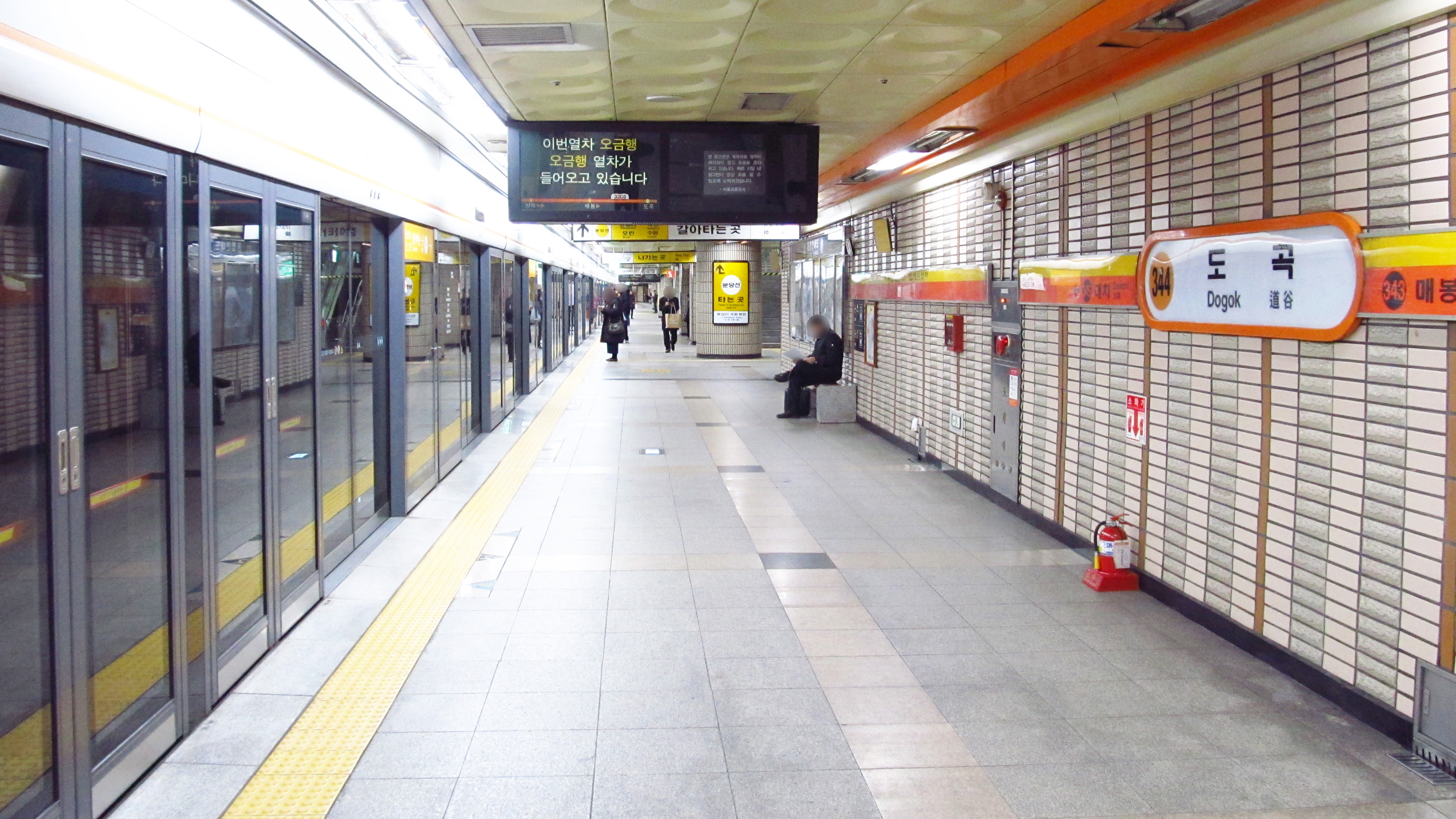
- Line 3 platform

Korean name
- Hangul: 도곡역
- Hanja: 道谷驛
- Revised Romanization: Dogongnyeok
- McCune–Reischauer: Togongnyŏk

General information
- Location: 339-2 Dogok 2-dong, 2814 Nambusunhwanno Jiha, Gangnam-gu, Seoul
- Coordinates: 37°29′26.99″N 127°3′19.38″E
- Operator: Seoul Metro; Korail
- Lines: Line 3 Suin–Bundang Line
- Platforms: 3
- Tracks: 4

Construction
- Structure type: Underground

Key dates
- October 30, 1993: Line 3 opened
- September 3, 2003: Suin–Bundang Line opened

Passengers
- (Daily) Based on Jan-Dec of 2012. Line 3: 17,579; Bundang Line: 8,487
Location

Dogok Station (Korean: 도곡역) is a station on Seoul Subway Line 3 and the Suin–Bundang Line in Gangnam District, Seoul. This station serves one of the most affluent neighborhoods in Korea; the Samsung Tower Palace complex, which includes one of the tallest buildings in South Korea, has a direct passageway link with the station. Another set of high-wealth residential apartments - the Dongbu Centreville - is also linked by an underground passageway. Other nearby high-wealth apartments include Dogok Rexle complex and Daechi I-Park.

Due to pipes running underneath the 4-way road intersection at which this station is located, it is built deep underground. For example, the Bundang Line platform is 6 floors below ground level.

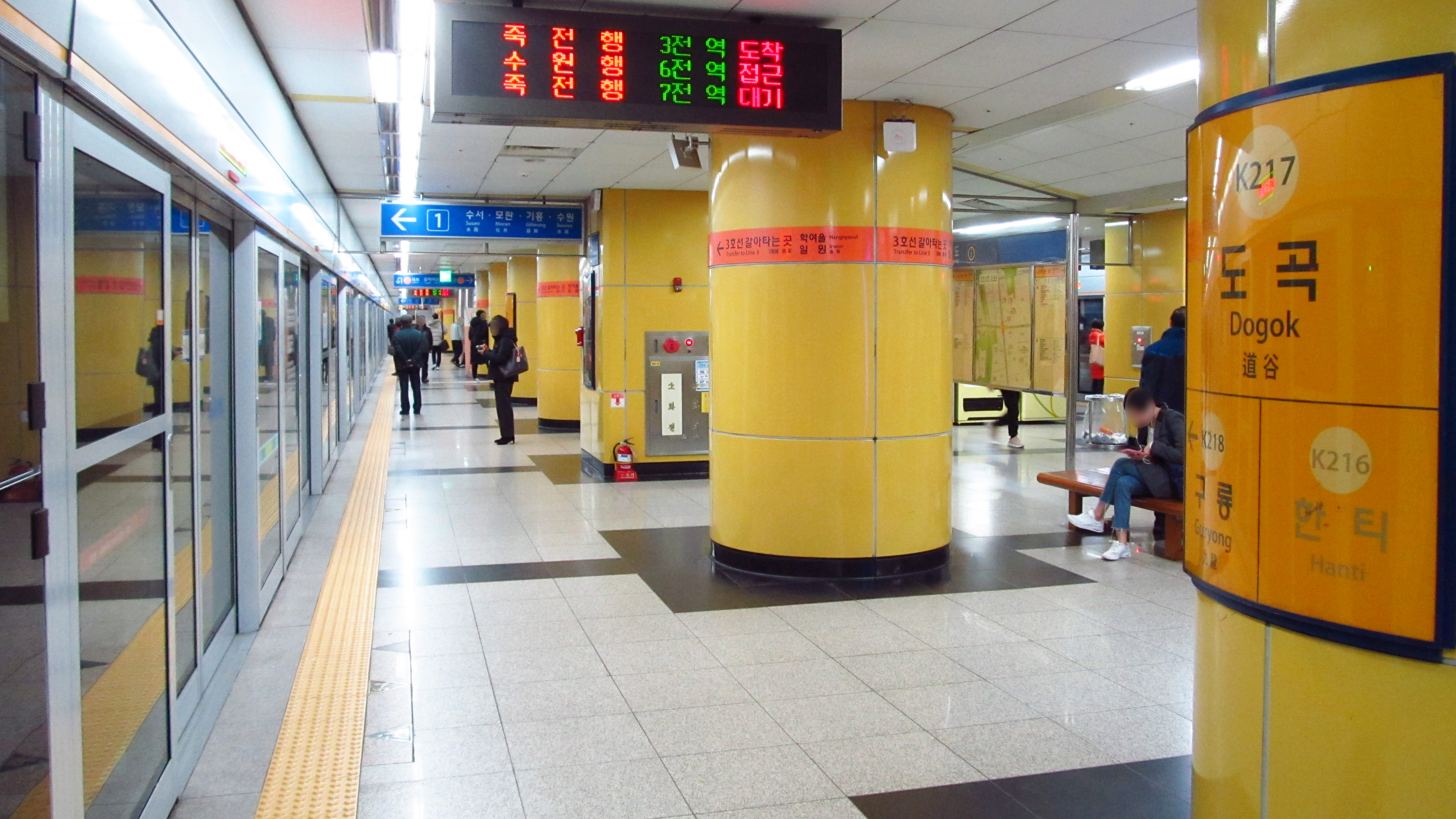
Suin-Bundang Line platform (2018)

== Vicinity ==
- Exit 1: Sookmyung Girls' High School, Seoul Daedo Elementary School, Dogok Rexle APT
- Exit 2: Dongbu Centreville APT, Raemian Daechi Palace APT
- Exit 3: Daecheong Middle School
- Exit 4: Samsung Tower Palace

Preceding station	Seoul Metropolitan Subway	Following station
Maebong towards Daehwa	Line 3	Daechi towards Ogeum
Hanti towards Cheongnyangni	Suin–Bundang Line	Guryong towards Incheon
