= Rose Bay =

Rose Bay may refer to:

== Places ==
- Rose Bay, New South Wales, Australia, a suburb of Sydney
- Rose Bay, Tasmania, Australia, a suburb of Hobart
- Rose Bay, Nova Scotia, a community in Canada
- Gulf of Roses, sometimes referred to in Spanish as Bahía de Rosas ("Bay of Roses"), a bay on the coast of Spain

== Schools ==
- Rose Bay Secondary College, Dover Height, New South Wales
- Rose Bay High School, Rose Bay, Tasmania

== Other uses ==
- Rose Bay Water Airport, Rose Bay, New South Wales

== See also ==
- Rosebay, a common name for several plants
- Rowes Bay, Queensland, Australia
