= Yangjae High School =

Seoul Yangjae High School (YHS)
- Hangul: 서울 양재고등학교

Location
- Seocho-dong, Seocho District; Seoul; Korea

Information
- Type: Public
- Motto: HOPE AND WISE YHSer
- Established: 1990
- Founder: Kim Hwa Gon
- Faculty: approx. 200
- Gender: Co-ed
- Enrolment: approx. 1,000
- Website: http://yangjae.sen.hs.kr/index.do

Seoul Yangjae High School (YHS; Korean: 서울 양재고등학교) is a public high school located in Gangnam School District Eight (강남 8학군), Seocho-dong, Seocho District, Seoul, Korea. This school is directly managed by Gangnam Education Office of the Government of South Korea. The Korean meaning of the school name means qualified student (良才·Yangjae). YHS is K-wave star Lee Jong-suk's alma mater and this is school chosen by many aspiring Korean top-tier students or entertainers living in the Gangnam area. The number of students per grade at Yangjae High School is about 300, around 20 percent of YHS students enter to Seoul National University, Korea University, and Yonsei University (SKY) annually. YHS campus is connected to the National Diplomatic Academy of Korea (국립외교원) and Seocho District Government Office (서초구청). Yangjae Station of Gangnam Seocho District is located right next to YHS.

According to Naeil Times of Korea, in Yangjae High School, actively operating 62 clubs. YHS students are required to find data and finish discussions through continuous learning activities such as exploration session.

Yangjae High School is a base school for cooperative curriculum in Gangnam and has natural programs similar with science focused high schools. The opening of task research subjects such as physical, chemical, life science, and earth science experiments, which have been operated since 2016, provide students from Yangjae High School as well as students from nearby schools in Gangnam an opportunity for in-depth classes. As a science-based school, there are many creative and substantial school programs, and inquiry reports and competitions are prepared. This is also the reason why natural students' competitiveness in entrance exams is outstanding. Yangjae High School Saturday Academy (YSA) is one of the curriculums of Yangjae High School. The Saturday Academy, which leads to occasional achievements for students, operates a humanities essay class and a mathematical essay class to enhance the competitiveness of second and third graders in liberal arts and natural sciences. It is a specialized program unique to Yangjae High School that can prepare for deeper essays while being linked to the curriculum. It will be conducted as an integrated special lecture on liberal arts and natural sciences as well as essay and past question analysis by topic, method of writing professional essay, and guidance on correction of answers. Yangjae High School has fostered future experts who aim for achievement with the goal of the school name in Korean "qualified students (良才)" Nine early admissions from Seoul National University in 2015 and 11 early admissions from Seoul National University in 2016, and it is a school with high proportion of SNU admissions among schools in Gangnam, Seoul, Korea and whole country.

In 2017, the 29th Korea National Federation of Elementary, Middle and High School has elected Min Byung-kwan, the Principal of Yangjae High School (YHS), as the chairman. Principal Min of YHS was the president of Seoul High School Association and the president of Republic of Korea National High School Association.

== History ==
- January 20, 1990: Establishment of Yangjae High School (42 classes) in Gangnam, Seoul, Korea
- March 1, 1990: First Principal Kim Hwa-gon took office
- March 3, 1990: The first entrance ceremony (1463 students in 14 classes, correction of Dogok School in Gangnam District Gangnam District)
- November 7, 1990: Transferred to a new school building in Seocho-dong, Seocho District which is Gangnam School District Eight Area
- July 17, 1999: Construction of Yangjae Hall
- Jul 19, 2002: Construction of the Intelligence Hall
- August 20, 2010: Construction of the Well-being Hall (School Meal Building)
- February 7, 2018: 26th graduation ceremony (318 students, 13,780 students total)
- March 1, 2018: Cho Yang-hyung, the 10th principal, was appointed
- March 2, 2018: 29th entrance ceremony (11 classes, 281 students)
