= Liv Little =

Magazine editor and writer (born 1994)

Olivia Little (born 1994) is the founder of gal-dem, an English online and print magazine run by women of colour, which ceased publication in 2023. In 2016, she was listed as one of the BBC's 100 Women. She published her first novel, Rosewater in 2023.

== Life ==
Little was born in January 1994 to a Jamaican-born father and mother of Guyanese descent. She was raised in South-East London and attended Blackheath High School and completed A-Levels at Newstead Wood School for Girls. During a year out between school and university she completed a 12-week placement in India as a Health and Livelihoods Coordinator with Restless Development, a branch within the International Citizen Service. She later studied Politics and Sociology at the University of Bristol, graduating in 2016 with First-Class Honours.

== gal-dem ==
Little founded gal-dem while at university after being frustrated with the lack of diversity at her university. The gal-dem team consisted of more than 70 people of colour from marginalised genders, most of whom were based in the UK but with others in countries around the world.

In 2016, to celebrate their first birthday, gal-dem produced the first print edition of the magazine. On 28 October 2016, the collective ran the Friday Late session at the V&A Museum. The session featured an all-female line-up, with activities ranging from a mass twerk workshop to the chance to hear the best female London MCs. Little stepped down from her role as the CEO of gal-dem in September 2020. gal-dem ceased publication in March 2023.

== Writing ==
Little published her first novel, Rosewater, in 2023. Writing in The Observer, Yagnishsing Dawoor described it as "a beautiful ode to queer love and friendship".

== Randall Kenan Prize ==
Little won the Randall Kenan Prize for Black LGBTQ Fiction in 2024. This prize is awarded by the Lambda Literary Foundation and honors Black LGBTQ fiction writers.

== Selected publications ==
- Little, Liv (2023). Rosewater. London: Dialogue. ISBN 978-0349702957.
