= Korean Educational Development Institute =

The Korean Educational Development Institute (KEDI) works for the South Korean Ministry of Education and Human Resource Development. It conducts research in the field of educational goals and methods, creating policy solutions.

The KEDI was founded in 1972, and has since played a principal role in Korea's emergence as an educationally advanced nation. Research and development projects conducted by KEDI assisted in the laying of the educational foundation during Korea's national restoration period (1970s to 1990s). Through its diverse research efforts, KEDI provided guidelines as well as lent initiative to the quantitative and qualitative expansion of school education in Korea.
