= Gwanaksan =

Mountain in Seoul, South Korea

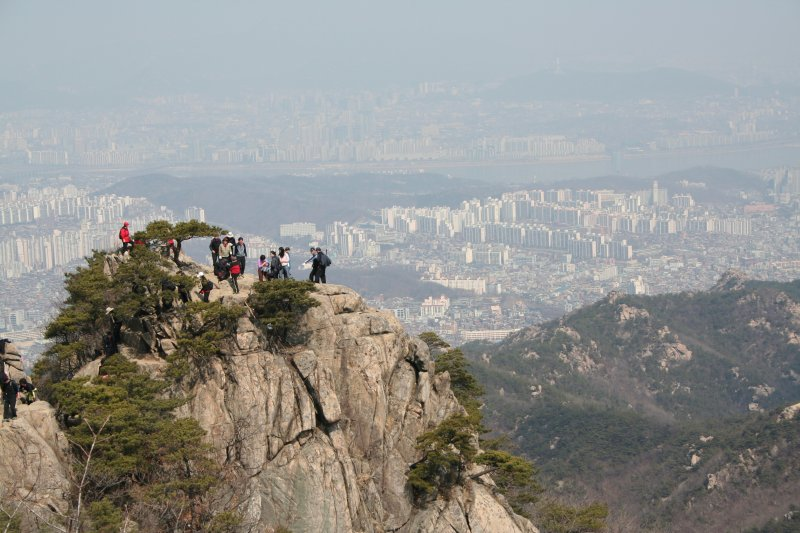
- People on a peak of the mountain (2007)

Highest point
- Elevation: 632 m (2,073 ft)
- Prominence: 632 m (2,073 ft)
- Coordinates: 37°26′44″N 126°57′49″E

Geography
- Location: Seoul, South Korea
- Parent range: Gwangju Mountains

Climbing
- Easiest route: Gwanak station, Anyang

Korean name
- Hangul: 관악산
- Hanja: 冠岳山
- RR: Gwanaksan
- MR: Kwanaksan

Gwanaksan (Korean: 관악산) is a mountain in southern Seoul, South Korea. Portions lie in the Gwanak District and Geumcheon District of Seoul; other portions lie in the neighboring cities of Anyang, Gyeonggi and Gwacheon. The name gwanak (Korean: 관악) means "hat-shaped peak," and refers to its gat-like profile. Mount Gwanak together with Mount Songaksan in Kaesong, Gamaksan (Gyeonggi) in Paju, Uaksan in Pocheon, and Hwaaksan in Gapyeong, was long considered one of the five representative peaks of Gyeonggi Province.

The main campus of Seoul National University is located just northwest of the mountain, and the Gwacheon national government complex lies to the east. Also nearby is the Anyang Resort Area, a popular local tourist attraction. On the mountain itself lie numerous Buddhist temples, including Wongaksa. Most of the mountain slope is protected land. The mountain is very popular with older climbers, since it can easily be reached by Seoul's public transportation. Annual hiking traffic is close to 5 million people. The Seoul side was designated a city park in 1968.

The four valleys to the east, west, north, and south of the mountain are collectively known as "Jaha-dong".

== Trails ==
- Seoul National University Entrance (11.3 km, 4 hours)
- Siheung-dong (11 km, 3 hours, 30 minutes)
- Anyang amusement park (12 km, 4 hours, 30 minutes)

== Gallery ==
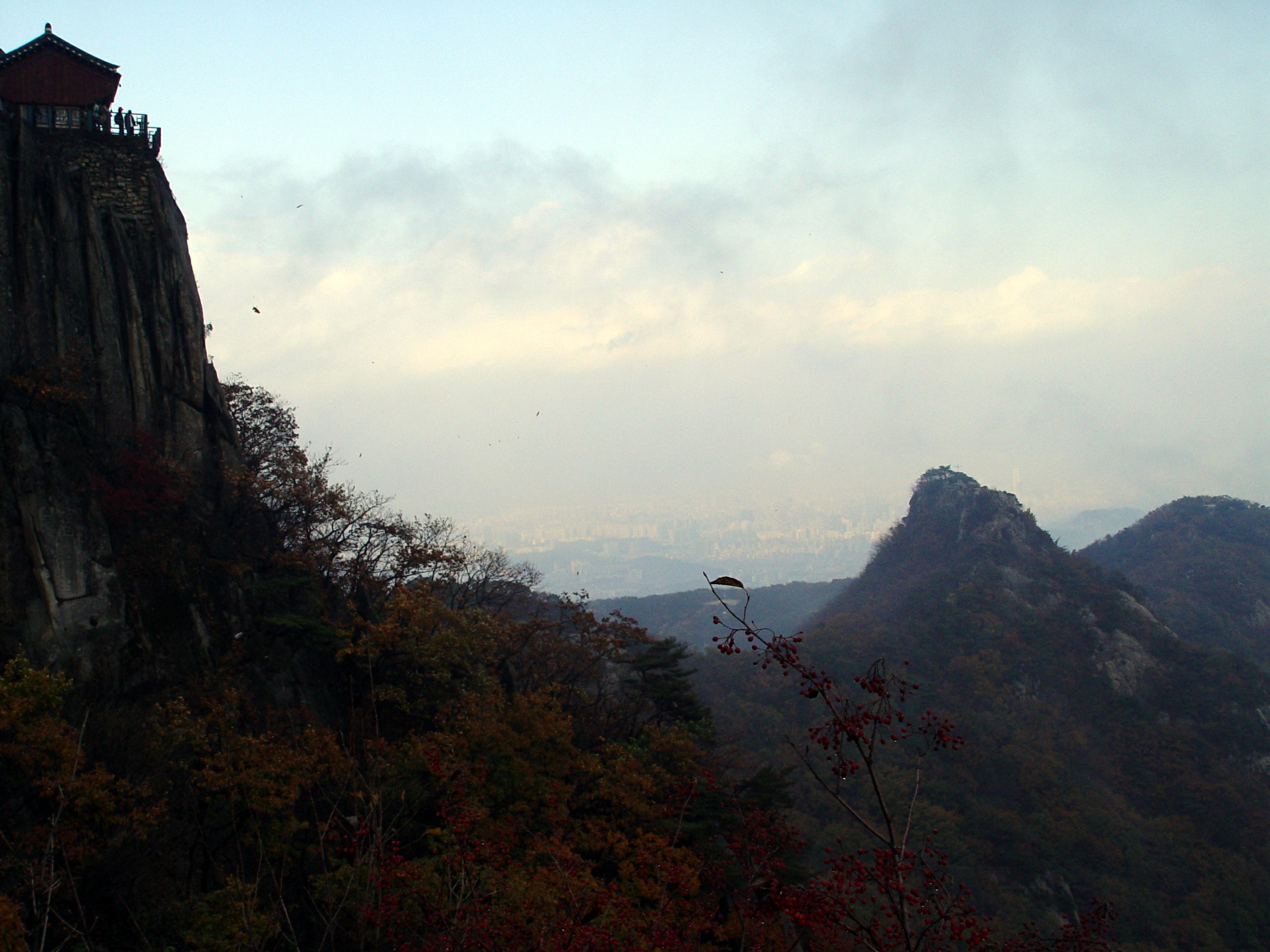
Yeonjudae summit

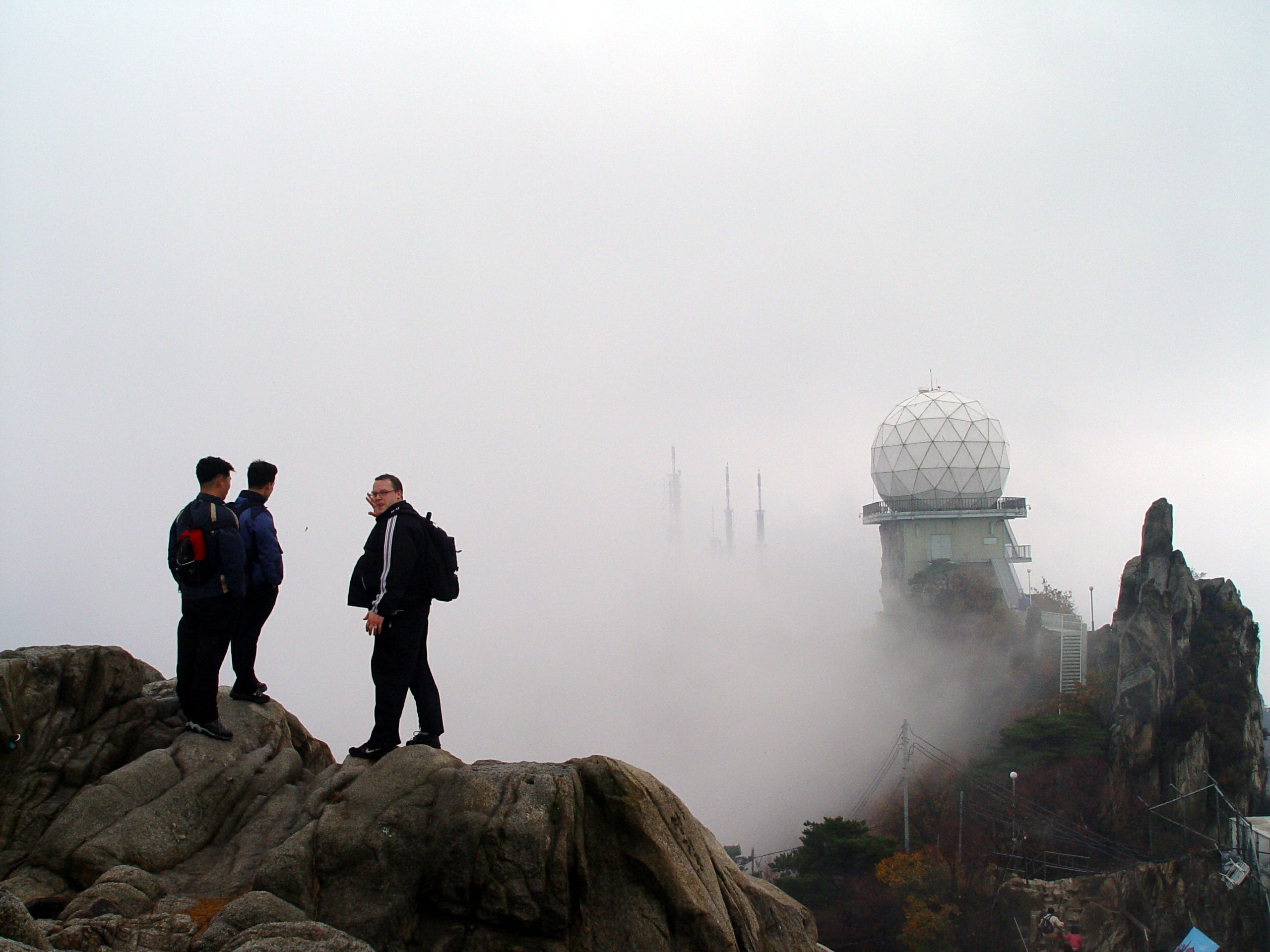
Radar equipment on the summit

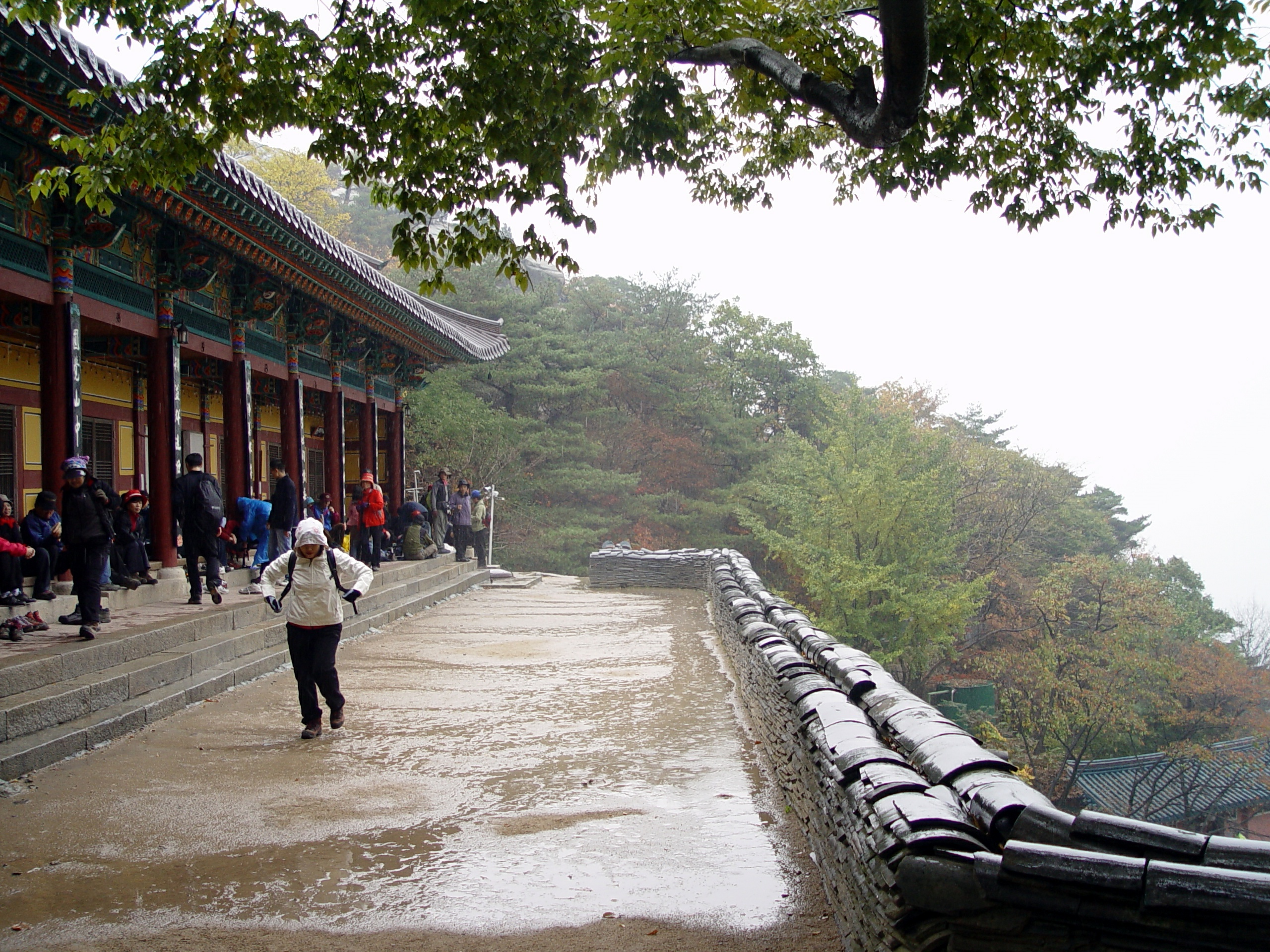
Yeonju Hermitage on the Gwacheon side

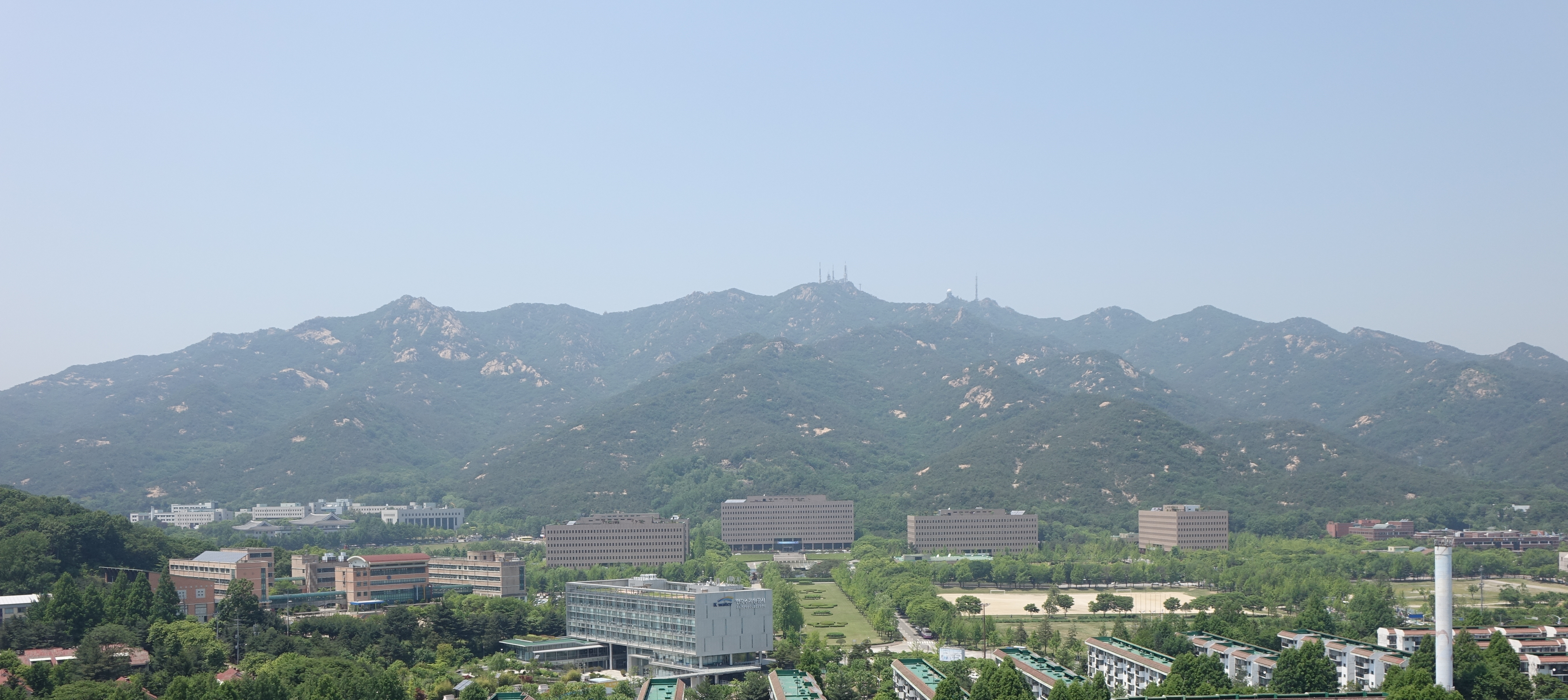
Government Complex in Gwacheon

== See also ==
- List of mountains in Seoul
- List of mountains in Korea
- Yangjaecheon
