= Timeline of Seoul =

The following is a timeline of the history of the city of Seoul, South Korea.

== Prior to 14th century ==
- 18 BCE – Baekje, Wirye-seong, settled. Seoul started functioning as the royal capital of Baekje until 475.
- 475 – Seoul changed hands from Baekje to Goguryeo.
- 551 – Seoul changed hands from Goguryeo to Baekje.
- 553 – Seoul changed hands from Baekje to Silla.
- 901 – Seoul under control of Taebong as Silla became divided into three kingdoms.
- 918 – Seoul became a part of newly founded Goryeo as the prior regime Taebong was overthrown.
- 1104 – Sukjong of Goryeo builds a palace in Seoul and declared it the second capital 'Namgyeong' meaning 'Southern Capital'.

== 14th-18th century ==
- 1394
  - Capital of the Joseon dynasty relocates to Seoul from Kaesong.
  - Jongmyo (shrine) built.
- 1395
  - Gyeongbokgung Palace built.
  - Jogyesa temple established.
- 1396 – Fortress Wall construction begins.
- 1398
  - Eight Gates built.
  - Sungkyunkwan founded.
- 1412 – Changdeokgung Palace built.
- 1414 – Namdaemun Market active.
- 1447 – Namdaemun rebuilt.
- 1467 – Wongaksa Pagoda constructed.
- 1592 – April: City taken by Japanese forces.

== 18th-19th century ==
- 1711 – Donuimun and Gwanghuimun (gates) rebuilt.
- 1741 – Changuimun (gate) rebuilt.
- 1796 – Hwaseong Fortress built.
- 1867 – Gwanghwamun (gate) reconstructed.
- 1897
  - Kurisudo sinmun newspaper begins publication.
  - Independence Gate erected.
- 1898 – Myeongdong Cathedral consecrated.
- 1899 – Gwallim Middle School established.
- 1900
  - Gyeongseong Station opens.
  - Incheon-Seoul and Chemulpo-Seoul railways begin operating.

== 20th century ==
=== 1900s-1950s ===
- 1901 – Busan-Seoul railway begins operating.
- 1905
  - Uiju-Seoul railway begins operating.
  - Dongdaemun Market in business.
- 1906 – Keijō Nippō newspaper established.
- 1907 – Seoul Sanitation Association founded.
- 1908 – Gyeongseong Gamok (prison) in operation.
- 1910
  - Japanese in power; city renamed "Keijō"
  - Population: 200,000 (approximate).
- 1914 – Outer parts of Gyeongseongbu were ceded to Goyang County.
- 1915 – Joseon Industrial Exhibition held in Gyeongbokgung
- 1920 – Chosun Ilbo and Dong-a Ilbo newspapers begin publication.
- 1922 – Namsan Public Library established.
- 1924 – Keijō Imperial University founded.
- 1925 – Seoul Station opens.
- 1926 – Japanese General Government Building constructed.
- 1927 – Noryangjin Fish Market in business.
- 1936 – The expansion of Gyeongseongbu was implemented absorbing Cheongnyangni, Anam, Sincheon, etc.
- 1940 – Joseon Grand Exposition held in Seoul
- 1945 – National Library of Korea and National Museum of Korea established.
- 1946
  - City renamed "Seoul" (approximate date).
  - Kim Hyongmin becomes mayor.
  - Seoul National University established.
- 1947 – Samsung Sanghoe in business.
- 1948
  - City becomes capital of Republic of Korea.
  - Seoul Philharmonic Orchestra founded.
- 1949
  - Seoul designated a special city (administrative division).
  - Expended to today's Gangbuk-gu to the north and Guro-dong, Sindorim-dong(including today's Daerim dong) to the south.
  - Population: 1,446,019.
- 1950
  - 28 June: Hangang Bridge bombing; city taken by North Korean army.
  - 16 July: Yongsan bombing.
  - 22–25 September: Second Battle of Seoul.
- 1951
  - January: Third Battle of Seoul.
  - 14 March: City taken by United Nations forces.
- 1953 – Korean Republic newspaper begins publication.
- 1954 – Hankook Ilbo newspaper begins publication.
- 1958 – Gimpo International Airport in operation.

=== 1960s-1990s ===
- 1960 – Gyeongdong Market in business.
- 1963 – The great expansion was implemented, incorporating parts of counties of Gimpo, Gwangju, Siheung, Yangju, and Bucheon.
- 1965 – Population: 3,793,280.
- 1969 – N Seoul Tower built.
- 1970
  - Gyeongbu Expressway constructed.
  - Population: 5,433,198.
- 1973
  - Jingwan-dong (Gupabal) was incorporated to Seoul from Goyang County.
  - World Taekwondo Headquarters established.
- 1974
  - Seoul Metropolitan Subway begins operating.
  - Korean Film Archive and Chugye University for the Arts established.
- 1975 – Sister city relationship established with San Francisco, USA.
- 1977 – Jeongdok Public Library opens.
- 1978 – Sejong Center built.
- 1980 – Population: 8,364,379.
- 1982 – Banpo Bridge constructed.
- 1983
  - Lucky-Goldstar Football Club formed.
  - Bukhansan National Park established.
- 1985
  - 63 Building constructed.
  - Population: 9,639,110.
- 1986 – Asian Games held.
- 1988
  - Goh Kun becomes mayor.
  - Summer Olympics held.
  - Seoul Museum of Art and Calligraphy Museum open.
  - Trade Tower built.
- 1989 – Lotte World recreation complex opens.
- 1990 – Population: 10,612,577.
- 1991
  - Blue House (government residence) built.
  - KBS Hall opens.
- 1993
  - Korea National University of Arts established.
  - Opera House opens.
  - War Memorial of Korea constructed.
- 1994 – Hi! Seoul Festival begins.
- 1995
  - The city boundary between Seoul and Gwangmyeong was rearranged, absorbing a very tiny part of Cheolsan-dong.
  - The city boundary between Seoul and Goyang was rearranged, absorbing a very tiny part of Jichuk-dong.
  - 29 June: Sampoong Department Store collapse.
  - Population: 10,776,201 (approximate estimate).
- 1999 – Jongno Tower built.
- 2000
  - Bukchon Preservation and Regeneration Project established.
  - Kumho Art Hall opens.

== 21st century ==
- 2001
  - Incheon International Airport begins operating.
  - Seoul World Cup Stadium opens.
  - ETP music festival begins.
- 2002
  - FIFA World Cup held.
  - Lee Myung-bak becomes mayor.
  - Seoul Museum of History established.
- 2003 – Hyperion Tower built.
- 2004
  - Samsung Tower Palace built.
  - Seoul Station renovated.
  - Seoul Metropolitan Government Amazones football club formed.
- 2005 – Seoul Forest opens.
- 2006 – Oh Se-hoon becomes mayor.
- 2009
  - Moonlight Rainbow Fountain installed.
  - West Seoul Lake Park opens.
- 2010 – November: G-20 summit held.
- 2011
  - June: Floods.
  - October: Asian Network of Major Cities 21 meeting held.
  - Park Won-soon becomes mayor.
  - Population: 10,581,728.
  - Shinbundang Line opens
- 2012
  - International Finance Center Seoul opens
  - ABU Radio Song Festival held.
  - Seoul City Hall rebuilt.
- 2014 – Dongdaemun Design Plaza opens
- 2015 – Gocheok Sky Dome opens
- 2016 – March: AI AlphaGo versus Lee Sedol match played.
- 2018 – Population: 9,962,393
- 2022
  - 29 October: Seoul Halloween crowd crush
- 2024
  - 2024 South Korean martial law crisis

== See also ==
- History of Seoul
- List of districts of Seoul
- List of neighbourhoods of Seoul
- Names of Seoul
- List of mayors of Seoul
- List of museums in Seoul
- List of Buddhist temples in Seoul
- List of universities and colleges in Seoul
- Timeline of Korean history
- List of cities by population density

== Bibliography ==
- Chisholm, Hugh, ed. (1910). "Seoul" . Encyclopædia Britannica. Vol. 24 (11th ed.). Cambridge University Press. pp. 667–668.
- T. Philip Terry (1928). "Seoul (Keijo)". Terry's guide to the Japanese empire: including Korea and Formosa. Boston: Houghton Mifflin Co. hdl:2027/mdp.39015062262517 – via HathiTrust.
- Janet Hunter (1977). "Japanese Government Policy, Business Opinion and the Seoul—Pusan Railway, 1894—1906". Modern Asian Studies. 11 (4): 573–599. doi:10.1017/s0026749x00000573. S2CID 106432258.
- Yeong-Hyun Kim (2004), "Seoul", in Josef Gugler (ed.), World Cities Beyond the West, Cambridge University Press, ISBN 9780521830034
- Todd A. Henry (2005). "Sanitizing Empire: Japanese Articulations of Korean Otherness and the Construction of Early Colonial Seoul, 1905-1919". Journal of Asian Studies. 64.
- Jesook Song (2006). "Historicization of Homeless Spaces: The Seoul Train Station Square and the House of Freedom". Anthropological Quarterly. 79. George Washington University Institute for Ethnographic Research.
- Sharon Hong (2013), "Seoul", Transforming Asian Cities, UK: Routledge
