= List of tallest buildings in Seoul =

Tall buildings in Seoul
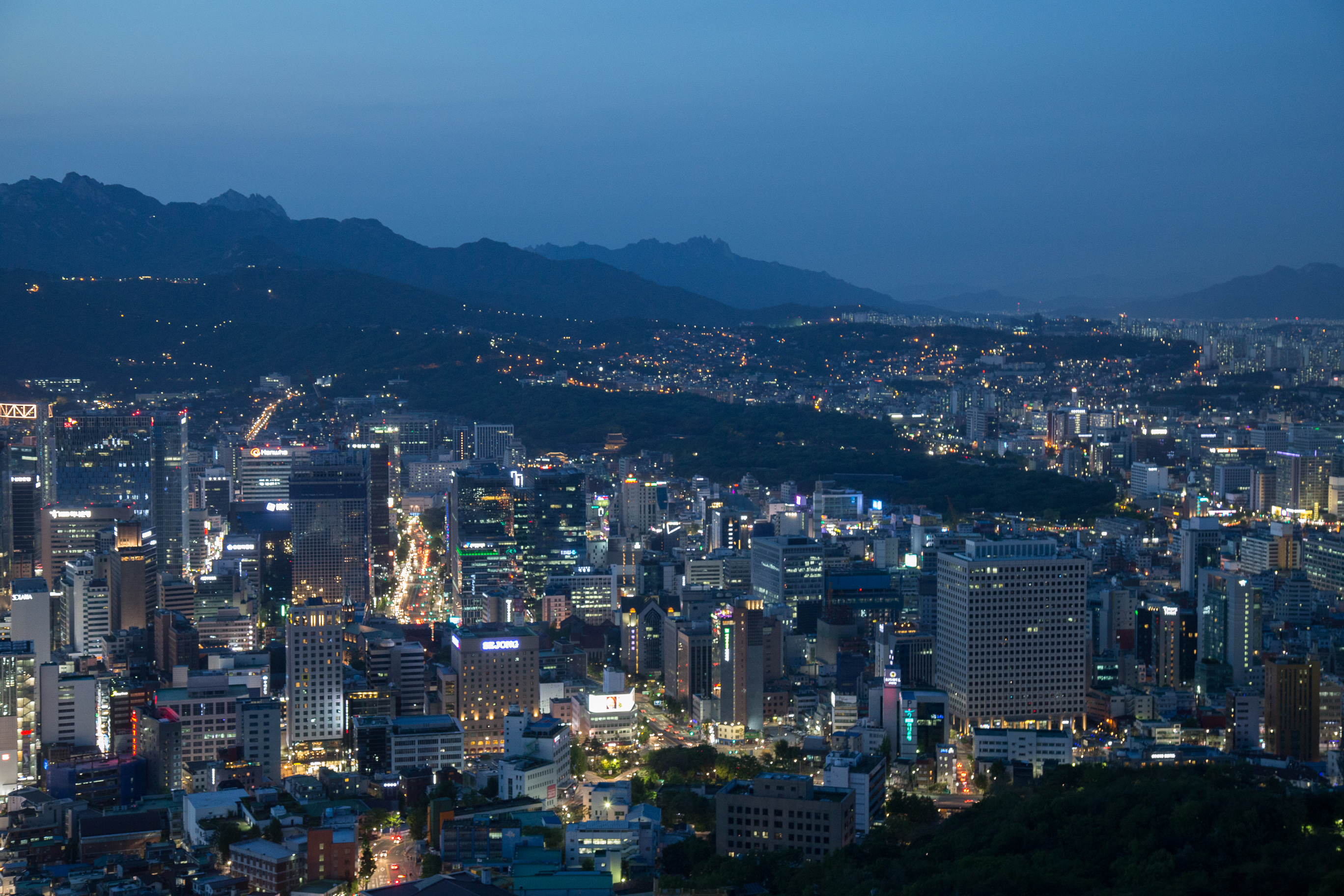
- Skyline of Seoul at night
- Tallest building: Lotte World Tower (2017)
- Tallest building height: 555 m (1,821 ft)
- First 150 m+ building: 63 Building (1985)

Number of tall buildings
- Taller than 100 m (328 ft): 580 (2025)
- Taller than 150 m (492 ft): 126 (2025)
- Taller than 200 m (656 ft): 24 (2025)
- Taller than 300 m (984 ft): 2
- Taller than 400 m (1,312 ft): 1

This list of tallest buildings in Seoul ranks skyscrapers in the South Korean capital city of Seoul by height. As of March 2024, this list contains 126 buildings that are 150 m (492 ft) tall or higher, of which only 82 are recognized by the Council of Tall Buildings and Urban Habitat.

The tallest building in Seoul is currently the 555 m (1,821 ft) Lotte World Tower with 123 floors, and is the sixth-tallest building in the world.

The tallest buildings in the city are concentrated in four locations: the traditional city center at Jongno, the modern business and financial district in Gangnam along Teheran Road between Gangnam Station and the COEX complex, the financial and political centre on the island of Yeouido, and the affluent residential neighbourhood of Dogok-dong.

Seoul is located in a valley surrounded by mountains with one mountain in the center, Namsan. On top of Namsan is Namsan Tower which is considered an iconic image of the city of Seoul and can be seen from almost anywhere in the city. To maintain this line of sight, many developers have had to set height limits on their buildings. The city also has strict laws about building heights for reasons of national security stressed by the Korean Air Force and U.S. Air Force.

== Tallest buildings ==
This lists ranks completed skyscrapers in Seoul that stand at least 150 m (492 ft) tall as of 2025, based on standard height measurement. This includes spires and architectural details but does not include antenna masts. The “Year” column indicates the year of completion. Existing structures are included for ranking purposes based on present height.

Was the tallest building in Seoul upon completion

Rank	Name	Image	Height m (ft)	Floors	Year	District	Notes
1	Lotte World Tower		555 m (1,821 ft)	123	2017	Songpa District	Tallest building in South Korea, 6th tallest building in the world. Tallest building in the OECD.
2	Parc1 Tower A		333 m (1,093 ft)	69	2020	Yeongdeungpo District	5th tallest building in South Korea.
3	Three IFC Office Tower		284 m (932 ft)	55	2012	Yeongdeungpo District	6th tallest building in South Korea
4	Samsung Tower Palace 3 Tower G		264 m (866 ft)	69	2003	Gangnam District	Tallest residential building in Seoul
5	Mok-dong Hyperion I Tower A		256 m (840 ft)	69	2003	Yangcheon District	
5	Parc1 Tower B		256 m (840 ft)	53	2020	Yeongdeungpo District	
7	63 Building		249 m (817 ft)	60	1985	Yeongdeungpo District	When completed in 1985, it was the tallest building in Asia
8	Federation of Korean Industries Head Office Building		245 m (804 ft)	50	2013	Yeongdeungpo District	
9	Mok-dong Hyperion I Tower B		239 m (784 ft)	69	2003	Yangcheon District	
10	Samsung Tower Palace One - Tower B		234 m (768 ft)	66	2003	Gangnam District	
11	Trade Tower		228 m (748 ft)	55	1988	Gangnam District	
12	Cheongnyangni Station Lotte Castle SKY-L65 D		226 m (741 ft)	65	2023	Dongdaemun District	Tallest building on the North bank of the Han River
12	Cheongnyangni Station Lotte Castle SKY-L65 B		226 m (741 ft)	65	2023	Dongdaemun District	
14	Cheongnyangni Station Lotte Castle SKY-L65 A		223 m (732 ft)	64	2023	Dongdaemun District	
15	Yeouido Teachers' Pension		220 m (720 ft)	42	2024	Yeongdeungpo District	
15	Cheongnyangni Station Lotte Castle SKY-L65 C		219 m (719 ft)	63	2023	Dongdaemun District	
16	Samsung Tower Palace One Tower A		209 m (686 ft)	59	2002	Gangnam District	
17	Samsung Tower Palace One - Tower C		209 m (686 ft)	59	2002	Gangnam District	
18	Gangnam Finance Center		204 m (669 ft)	45	2000	Gangnam District	
19	Samsung Electronics Headquarters		203 m (666 ft)	44	2008	Seocho District	
20	Seoul Trimage Tower I		201 m (659 ft)	47	2017	Seongdong District	
20	Seoul Trimage Tower II		201 m (659 ft)	47	2017	Seongdong District	
20	Mok-dong Hyperion Tower C		201 m (659 ft)	69	2003	Yangcheon District	
20	Raemian Caelitus Tower 1		201 m (659 ft)	56	2015	Yongsan District	
24	Conrad Seoul		200 m (660 ft)	38	2012	Yeongdeungpo District	
25	Acro Seoul Forest Residence A		199 m (653 ft)	48	2021	Seongdong District	
26	Acro Seoul Forest Residence B		199 m (653 ft)	48	2021	Seongdong District	
27	The Classic 500 Tower A		196 m (643 ft)	50	2009	Gwangjin District	
27	The Sharp Star City Tower A		196 m (643 ft)	58	2006	Gwangjin District	
29	Cheongnyangni Station Hanyang Sujain 192 - 101		192 m (630 ft)	59	2023	Dongdaemun District	
30	Samsung Tower Palace 2 - Tower E		191 m (627 ft)	55	2004	Gangnam District	
30	Samsung Tower Palace 2 - Tower F		191 m (627 ft)	55	2004	Gangnam District	
32	Sindorim Daeseong D-Cube City		190 m (620 ft)	43	2011	Guro District	
33	Techno Mart 21		189 m (620 ft)	38	1998	Gwangjin District	
34	One IFC Office Tower		186 m (610 ft)	32	2012	Yeongdeungpo District	
34	Mokdong Trapalace Tower A		186 m (610 ft)	49	2009	Yangcheon District	
36	Cheongnyangni Station Lotte Castle SKY-L65 - Landmark Tower		185 m (607 ft)	42	2023	Dongdaemun District	
36	Sangbong Premier's Emco Tower 1		185 m (607 ft)	47	2014	Jungnang District	
36	G-Valley G-Square		185 m (607 ft)	39	2020	Guro District	
39	Seoul Trimage Tower III		184 m (604 ft)	36	2017	Seongdong District	
39	Seoul Trimage Tower IV		184 m (604 ft)	36	2017	Seongdong District	
41	Parnas Tower		183 m (600 ft)	38	2016	Gangnam District	
41	Mokdong Trapalace Tower C		183 m (600 ft)	48	2009	Yangcheon District	
41	Shindorim Daeseong D-Cube City Tower 1		183 m (600 ft)	51	2011	Guro District	
41	Shindorim Daeseong D-Cube City Tower 2		183 m (600 ft)	51	2011	Guro District	
45	Cheongnyangni Station Hanyang Sujain 192 - 104		182 m (597 ft)	56	2023	Dongdaemun District	
45	Shindorim Techno Mart		182 m (597 ft)	40	2008	Guro District	
47	Mecenapolis 101		180 m (590 ft)	39	2012	Mapo District	
47	Mecenapolis 102		180 m (590 ft)	39	2012	Mapo District	
47	Mecenapolis Office Tower		180 m (590 ft)	39	2012	Mapo District	
50	Cheongnyangni Station Hanyang Sujain 192 - 102		179 m (587 ft)	55	2023	Dongdaemun District	
51	The Sharp Star City Tower B		177 m (581 ft)	50	2008	Gwangjin District	
52	ASEM Tower		176 m (577 ft)	42	1999	Gangnam District	
52	Two IFC Office Tower		176 m (577 ft)	29	2012	Yeongdeungpo District	
54	Gangdong Raemian Palace Tower 101		175 m (574 ft)	45	2017	Gangdong District	
54	Gangdong Raemian Palace Tower 102		175 m (574 ft)	45	2017	Gangdong District	
54	Gangdong Raemian Palace Tower 103		175 m (574 ft)	45	2017	Gangdong District	
57	Boramae Chereville		174 m (571 ft)	49	2002	Dongjak District	
58	LG Gangnam Tower		173 m (568 ft)	38	1998	Gangnam District	
58	The Sharp Star City Tower C		173 m (568 ft)	50	2006	Gwangjin District	
60	Acro Seoul Forest Office Tower		172 m (564 ft)	35	2021	Seongdong District	
61	Galleria Foret Tower 1		170 m (560 ft)	45	2011	Seongdong District	
61	Galleria Foret Tower 2		170 m (560 ft)	45	2011	Seongdong District	
61	Yeouido Brighten Residence A		168 m (551 ft)	49	2023	Yeongdeungpo District	
61	Yeouido Brighten Residence B		168 m (551 ft)	49	2023	Yeongdeungpo District	
61	Yeouido Brighten Officetel		168 m (551 ft)	49	2023	Yeongdeungpo District	
61	Yeouido Brighten Office		168 m (551 ft)	49	2023	Yeongdeungpo District	
61	Hyundai 41 Tower		168 m (551 ft)	41	2001	Yangcheon District	
68	Academy Sweet		167 m (548 ft)	51	2004	Yongsan District	
69	Raemian Caelitus Tower 2		166 m (545 ft)	42	2015	Yongsan District	
70	Samsung Tower Palace 1 Tower D		164 m (538 ft)	42	2002	Gangnam District	
71	Daelim Acrovill 1		163 m (535 ft)	46	1999	Gangnam District	
71	Daelim Acrovill 2		163 m (535 ft)	46	1999	Gangnam District	
71	Mokdong Trapalace Tower B		163 m (535 ft)	42	2009	Yangcheon District	
71	Cheongnyangni Station Hanyang Sujain 192 - 103		163 m (535 ft)	50	2023	Dongdaemun District	
75	Hyundai Superville Tower D		162 m (531 ft)	46	2003	Seocho District	
76	Seed Cube Chang-Dong		160 m (520 ft)	49	2023	Dobong District	
76	Mokdong Trapalace Tower D		160 m (520 ft)	41	2009	Yangcheon District	
76	Seoul Forest by POSCO Tower I		160 m (520 ft)	42	2014	Seongdong District	
76	Seoul Forest by POSCO Tower II		160 m (520 ft)	42	2014	Seongdong District	
76	Seoul Forest by POSCO Tower III		160 m (520 ft)	42	2014	Seongdong District	
76	SK Building		160 m (520 ft)	38	2000	Jongno District	
82	Sangbong Premier's Emco Tower 2		159 m (522 ft)	43	2014	Jungnang District	
82	Sangbong Premier's Emco Tower 3		159 m (522 ft)	43	2014	Jungnang District	
82	Teheran-ro 237 Tower A		159 m (522 ft)	37	2021	Gangnam District	
82	Teheran-ro 237 Tower B		159 m (522 ft)	35	2021	Gangnam District	
86	I-Park Tower 103		158 m (518 ft)	46	2004	Gangnam District	
87	Yeouido Post Office		157 m (515 ft)	33	2020	Yeongdeungpo District	
88	I-Park Tower 101		156 m (512 ft)	45	2004	Gangnam District	
88	Doosan Tower		156 m (512 ft)	34	1999	Jongno District	
90	Sangbong Santé Le Ciel East Tower		155 m (509 ft)	41	2009	Jungnang District	
90	Sangbong Santé Le Ciel West Tower		155 m (509 ft)	41	2009	Jungnang District	
90	The Sharp Star City Tower D		155 m (509 ft)	45	2006	Gwangjin District	
90	Yongsan Prugio Summit Tower I		155 m (509 ft)	39	2017	Yongsan District	
94	S-Trenue		154 m (505 ft)	36	2009	Yeongdeungpo District	
94	Brownstone Seoul 101		154 m (505 ft)	39	2005	Jongno District	
96	Dongbu Finance Building		151 m (495 ft)	35	2001	Gangnam District	
96	Yeouido Richensia Tower 1		151 m (495 ft)	40	2004	Yeongdeungpo District	
96	Yeouido Richensia Tower 2		151 m (495 ft)	40	2004	Yeongdeungpo District	
99	KCC Welltz Tower A		150 m (490 ft)	39	2015	Yongsan District	
99	KCC Welltz Tower B		150 m (490 ft)	39	2015	Yongsan District	
99	Centreville Asterium Office Tower		150 m (490 ft)	35	2013	Yongsan District	
99	Centreville Asterium Residential Tower 101		150 m (490 ft)	35	2013	Yongsan District	
99	Centreville Asterium Residential Tower 102		150 m (490 ft)	35	2013	Yongsan District	
99	Galleria Palace Tower A		150 m (490 ft)	46	2005	Songpa District	
99	Galleria Palace Tower B		150 m (490 ft)	46	2003	Songpa District	
99	Galleria Palace Tower C		150 m (490 ft)	46	2003	Songpa District	
99	Hawolgok Starclass Tower A		150 m (490 ft)	41	2010	Seongbuk District	
99	Hawolgok Starclass Tower B		150 m (490 ft)	41	2010	Seongbuk District	
99	Raemian Caelitus Tower 3		150 m (490 ft)	36	2015	Yongsan District	
99	Samsung SDS Tower		150 m (490 ft)	30	2014	Songpa District	Jamsil Hyanggun Twin Tower 1.
99	Hyanggun Tower		150 m (490 ft)	30	2014	Songpa District	Jamsil Hyanggun Twin Tower 2.
99	Jamsil Prugio Worldmark I		150 m (490 ft)	39	2013	Songpa District	
99	Jamsil Prugio Worldmark II		150 m (490 ft)	39	2013	Songpa District	
99	Namsan Trapalace Office Tower		150 m (490 ft)	28	2013	Jung District	
99	Namsan Trapalace Residential Tower		150 m (490 ft)	37	2013	Jung District	
99	Samsung Distribution Tower		150 m (490 ft)	34	2007	Seocho District	
99	Samsung Life Insurance Tower		150 m (490 ft)	32	2007	Seocho District	
99	Sindonga Familie Residential Tower A		150 m (490 ft)	41	2015	Gangdong District	
99	Sindonga Familie Residential Tower B		150 m (490 ft)	41	2015	Gangdong District	
99	SsangYong Yongsan Platinum Tower A		150 m (490 ft)	30	2014	Yongsan District	
99	SsangYong Yongsan Platinum Tower B		150 m (490 ft)	30	2014	Yongsan District	
99	Yongsan Raemian Tower I		150 m (490 ft)	40	2017	Yongsan District	
99	Yongsan Raemian Tower II		150 m (490 ft)	40	2017	Yongsan District	
99	Yongsan Prugio Summit Tower II		150 m (490 ft)	38	2017	Yongsan District	
99	Seoul Dragon City		150 m (490 ft)	39	2017	Yongsan District	
99	East Central Tower		150 m (490 ft)	36	2017	Gangdong District	

== Tallest under construction or proposed ==
=== Under construction ===
This lists ranks Seoul's skyscrapers over 150m that are currently under construction.

Name	Height m (ft)	Floors	Completion	District	Notes
Hyundai Global Business Center	569 m (1,867 ft)	105	2030	Gangnam District	
Angsana Residence Yeouido Seoul	249 m (817 ft)	57	2026	Yeongdeungpo District	
Hyundai Global Business Center Convention Center	193 m (633 ft)	35	2027	Gangnam District	

=== Approved ===
This lists ranks Seoul's skyscrapers over 150m that are currently proposed/approved for construction.

Name	Height m (ft)	Floors	Completion	District	Notes
New Trade Tower	300 m (980 ft)	-	2023	Songpa District	Proposed
Seocho Lotte Town	250 m (820 ft)	60	2019	Seocho District	Proposed

== Timeline of tallest buildings ==
Name	Image	Height m (ft)	Floors	Period	District	Notes
Seosomun KAL Building		86 m (282 ft)	23	1969-1970	Jung District	
31 Building		114 m (374 ft)	31	1970-1979	Jongno District	
Lotte Hotel Seoul		138 m (453 ft)	37	1979-1985	Jung District	
63 Building		249 m (817 ft)	61	1985-2003	Yeongdeungpo District	
Mok-dong Hyperion I Tower A		256 m (840 ft)	69	2003-2004	Yangcheon District	
Samsung Tower Palace 3 Tower G		264 m (866 ft)	69	2004-2012	Gangnam District	Tallest residential building in Seoul.
Three IFC Office Tower		284 m (932 ft)	55	2012-2017	Yeongdeungpo District	5th tallest building in South Korea.
Lotte World Tower		555 m (1,821 ft)	123	2017–present	Songpa District	Tallest building in OECD.

== Skylines ==
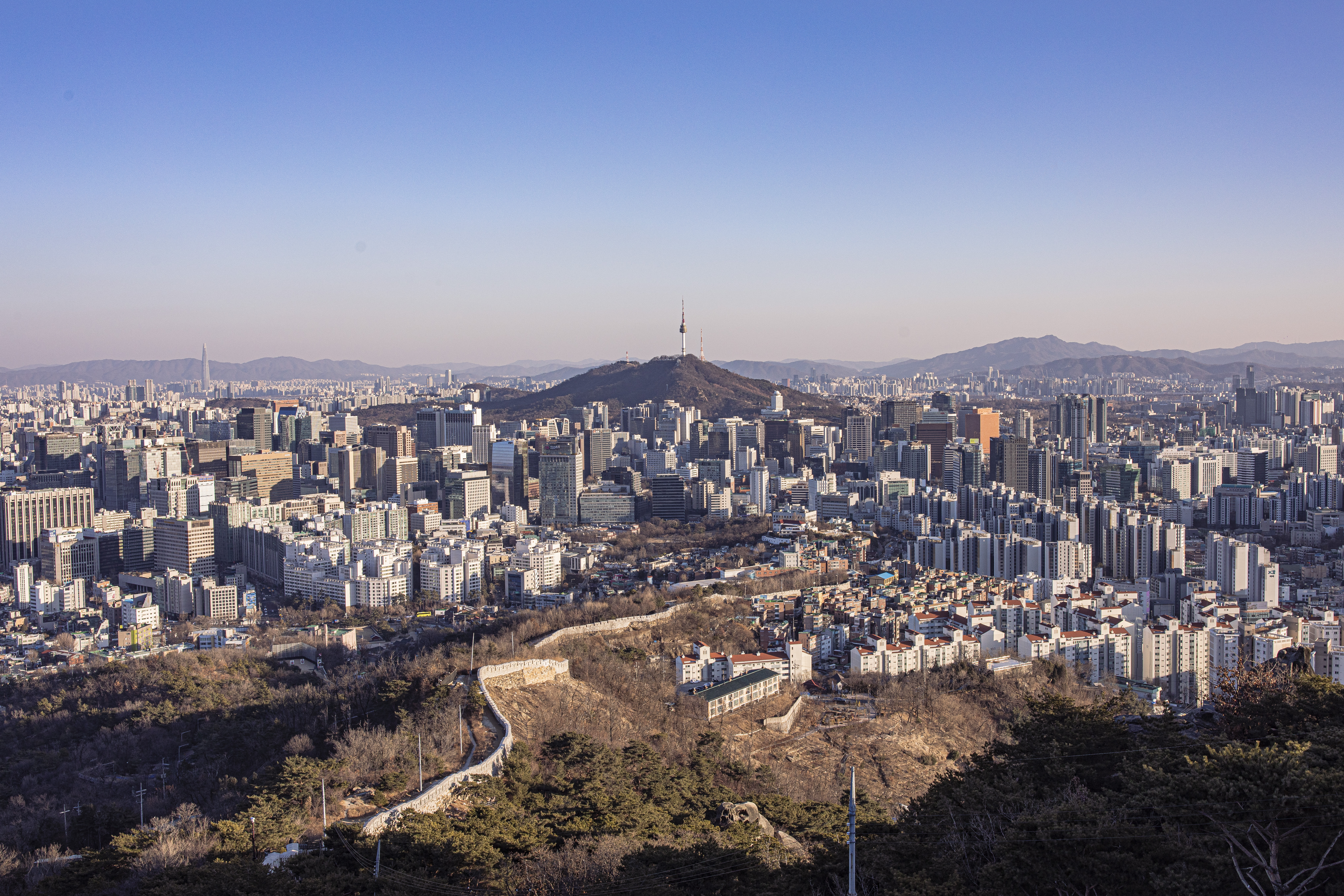
Downtown Seoul

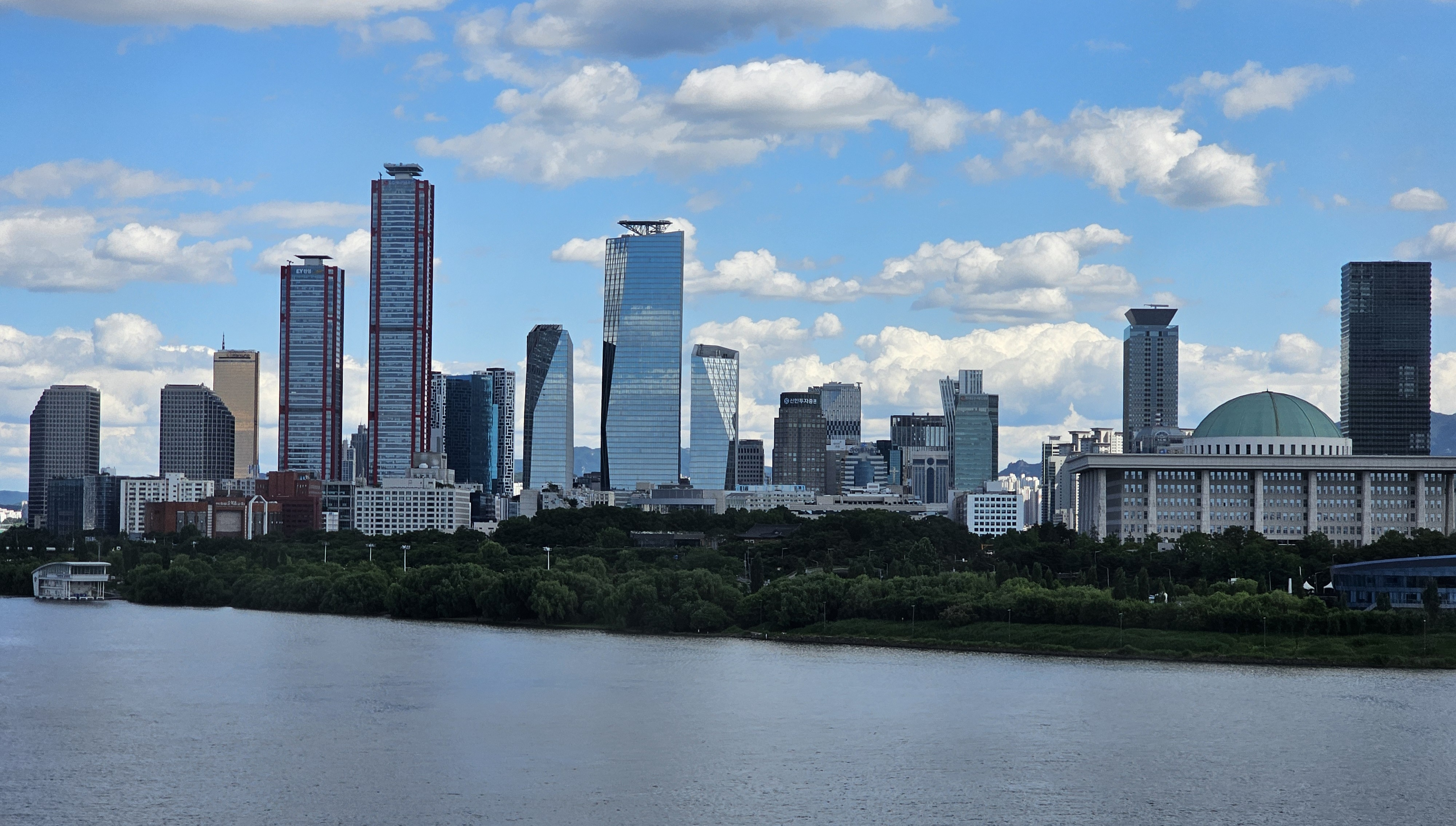
Yeouido

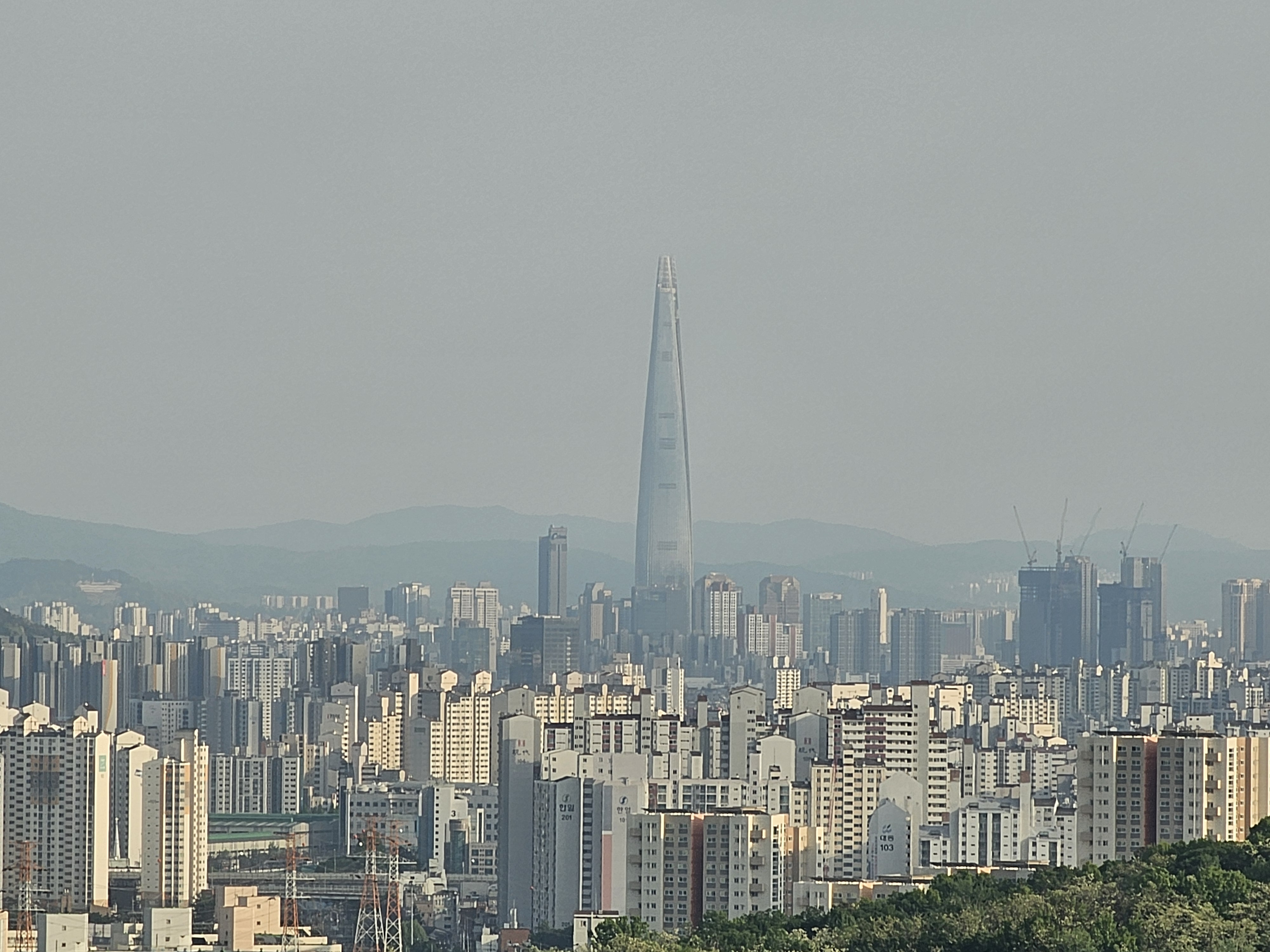
Songpa

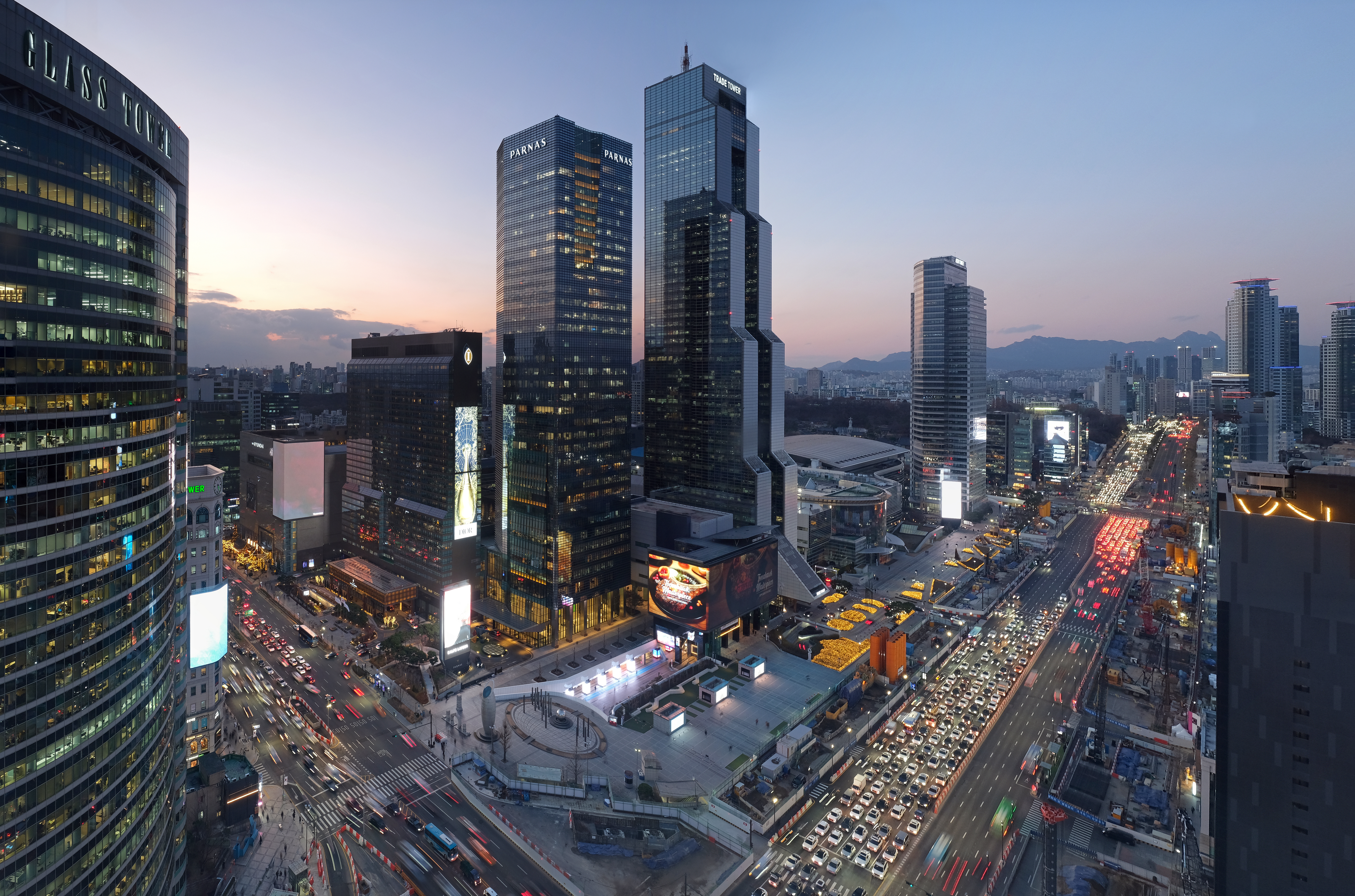
Gangnam
