= Yeoui-dong =

Neighborhood of Seoul, South Korea

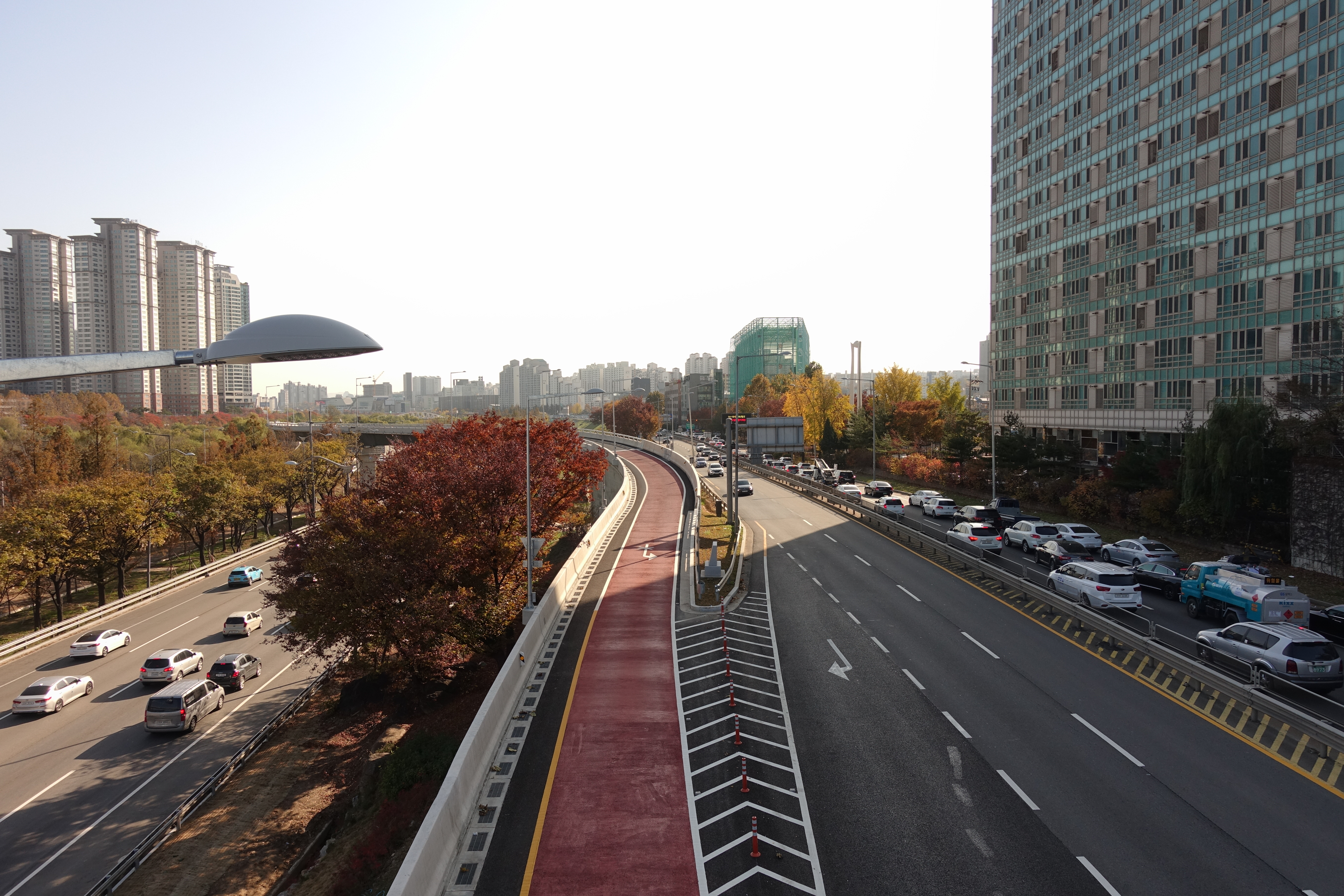
- Interactive map of Yeoui-dong
- Country: South Korea

Area
  - Total: 8.40 km^{2} (3.24 sq mi)

Population (2001)
  - Total: 29,756
  - Density: 3,542.38/km^{2} (9,174.7/sq mi)

Korean name
- Hangul: 여의동
- Hanja: 汝矣洞
- RR: Yeoui-dong
- MR: Yŏŭi-dong

Yeoui-dong (Korean: 여의동) is a dong (neighborhood) of Yeongdeungpo District, Seoul, South Korea.

Before 1 July 1980 it was called Yeouido-dong.

== Attractions ==
- National Assembly of South Korea
- Munhwa Broadcasting Corporation (MBC)
- Korean Broadcasting System (KBS) - KBS New Wing Open Hall located in Yeoui-dong, is the broadcast and recording studio of many KBS programs with a studio audience: namely, the live weekly music show Music Bank.
- 63 Building
- Yeouido
- Yeouido Park
- International Financial Center Seoul

- IFC Office Towers - opened in 2011
- IFC Mall Seoul - opened in August 2012
- Conrad Seoul - opened on 12 November 2012

- Yoido Full Gospel Church

== Economy ==
Hanjin Shipping, LG Corp., and Keoyang Shipping are headquartered in Yeoui-dong.

== See also ==
- Administrative divisions of South Korea
