= Hanwha Life Insurance =

Life insurance company in South Korea

- 63 Building in Yeouido, Seoul, South Korea, the headquarters of Hanwha Life Insurance.
- Native name: 한화생명
- Company type: Public
- Traded as: KRX: 088350
- Industry: Insurance
- Predecessor: Korea Life Insurance
- Founded: September 9, 1946
- Headquarters: 63 Building, Yeouido, Seoul, South Korea
- Key people: Kwon Hyek Woong (CEO), Lee Kyung Keun (CEO)
- Products: Annuities; Health insurance; Life insurance
- Revenue: US$9.5bn (2013, 9months)
- Net income: {US$372M (2013, 9months)
- Total assets: {US$78.5bn (December 2013)
- Parent: Hanwha Group
- Website: www.hanwhalife.com

Hanwha Life Insurance (Korean: 한화생명보험) is an insurance company with total assets exceeding 100 trillion won as of the end of 2023. It is part of the Hanwha Group.

== History ==
Founded on September 9, 1946, as Korea Life Insurance, Hanwha Life Insurance Co., Ltd. is based in Hanwha Finance Center 63 in Yeouido, a landmark building of Seoul. Korea Life Insurance changed its name to Hanwha Life Insurance in October 2012.

== Products ==
Hanwha Life Insurance's main products include Whole Life Insurance and Critical Illness Insurance, savings-type insurance, including Annuity, and others. Additionally, Hanwha Life Insurance serves individual asset management through trust commodities, retirement pensions, accident and health insurance, and group insurance to companie. Hanwha Life Insurance has sales channels including individual agents, Bancassurance through agencies of banks, and an internet sales channel, Onsure.

== Culture ==
Hanwha Life Insurance has an e-sports team, Hanwha Life Esports, that competes in League of Legends Champions Korea.

== Branches ==
- Hanwha Life Insurance Vietnam
- Hanwha Life Instance Indonesia
