= Hyundai Global Business Center =

Proposed building in Samseong-dong, Gangnam District, Seoul, South Korea

- 현대차 글로벌 비즈니스 센터
- Interactive map of the Hyundai Global Business Center area

General information
- Status: Under construction
- Location: Samseong-dong, Gangnam-gu, Seoul, South Korea
- Coordinates: 37.5119°N 127.0629°E
- Construction started: 20 May 2020
- Estimated completion: 2030
- Owner: Hyundai Motor Group

Height
- Architectural: 569 m (1,867 ft)
- Tip: 554 m
- Antenna spire: 569 m
- Roof: 553.8 m (1,817 ft)

Technical details
- Floor count: 105
- Floor area: 926,162 m (3,038,589 ft)

Website
- sid.seoul.go.kr/..

Hyundai Global Business Center (Korean: 현대차 글로벌 비즈니스 센터) is a proposed building in Samseong-dong, Gangnam District, Seoul with a planned height of 569 metres (1,867 ft) and planned floor count of 105. If completed, it will be a supertall skyscraper.

In January 2021, the project was reported to be cancelled or undergoing redesign.

This 242-meter, 794-foot redesign is Tower 1 and 2, but 55 stories floods its newest or future canceled in the 2021 project itself on October 20, 2024.

The results of the 569-meter, 1,867-foot return are 105 stories, but it is project was 2016 on October 11, 2024, or resume construction is supertalls future in South Korea.

== History ==
Initial work on the site began in 2016 with the demolition of the existing KEPCO building in May 2016.

The Hyundai Motor Group had previously planned to construct a 553.0-meter-tall building, but had to revise it to 569 meters due to some systemic issues.

The building complex will stand on a floor space of 926,162 meters to house the new headquarters building with 105 floors on a 560,442-square-meter space. The building will also host a 155,082-square-meter hotel and facility building with 35 floors, 67,768-square-meter concert hall with 9 floors, 68,895-square-meter convention center with 6 floors and 20,006-square-meter exhibition hall with 4 floors, according to the draft. An observatory will be located on 552 meters above the ground as originally planned. The concert hall with 2,000 seats will become the largest one in Gangnam. The Hyundai Motor Group will also build a sunken square connecting the complex to the underground of Yeongdong Bridge, public open space and public pedestrian passage, the group said in the draft.

== See also ==
- List of buildings with 100 floors or more
- List of tallest buildings in Seoul
- List of tallest buildings in South Korea
