= Parnas Tower =

38-floor, 183-metre (600 ft) supertall skyscraper

- 파르나스타워
- Interactive map of the Parnas Tower area

General information
- Status: Complete
- Location: Seoul, South Korea
- Coordinates: 37.5084°N 127.0609°E
- Construction started: 2011
- Completed: 2016

Height
- Height: 183 m (600 ft)

Technical details
- Floor count: 38

The Parnas Tower (Korean: 파르나스 타워) is a 38-floor, 183-metre (600 ft) skyscraper in Gangnam District, Seoul, South Korea. It was developed by GS Engineering & Construction in 2016 and was sold to an affiliate, GS Retail.

== See also ==
- List of tallest buildings in Seoul
