= Parc1 =

Supertall skyscraper in Seoul

- 파크원
- Parc1 in 2022

General information
- Status: Completed
- Location: 108, Yeoui-daero, Yeongdeungpo-gu, Seoul, South Korea
- Coordinates: 37°31′33.94″N 126°55′41.51″E
- Groundbreaking: 5 June 2007
- Construction started: 15 February 2008
- Completed: 13 July 2020
- Opened: 31 July 2020

Height
- Architectural: 333 m (1,093 ft)
- Roof: 318 m (1,043 ft)

Technical details
- Floor count: 69

Design and construction
- Architect: RSHP
- Structural engineer: Arup Group
- Main contractor: POSCO E&C

Other information
- Public transit: Yeouido

Website
- www.parc1.com

Parc1 (Korean: 파크원) is a complex of buildings in Yeouido, Seoul, South Korea. It stands 333 m (1,093 ft) tall and contains 69 floors. Construction stopped in 2011 but resumed in early 2017.

== History ==
Parc1 is a US$1.5-billion shopping/hotel/office complex realized by Skylan Properties Korea Ltd., a foreign-invested property development and management services group with offices in Seoul, Beijing and Kuala Lumpur. Morgan Stanley, a global investment bank, was engaged as the financial advisor to arrange financing for the project.

Parc1 was the current Tongil Parking Lot site, a 46,465 square metre plot set between financial and residential districts and bordering Yeouido Park.

Designed by architect Lord Richard Rogers, chief architectural advisor to the mayor of London, the central structure will be a six-story glass mall, offering space for 400 stores.

== Structures ==
- Tower I
- Tower II
- The Hyundai Seoul
- Fairmont Ambassador Seoul

== Notable tenants ==
- NH Investment & Securities
- LG Energy Solution

== See also ==
- List of tallest buildings in Seoul
- List of tallest buildings in South Korea
