= Mok-dong Hyperion Towers =

Apartment towers in Seoul, South Korea

Coordinates: 37°31′37.74″N 126°52′30.13″E

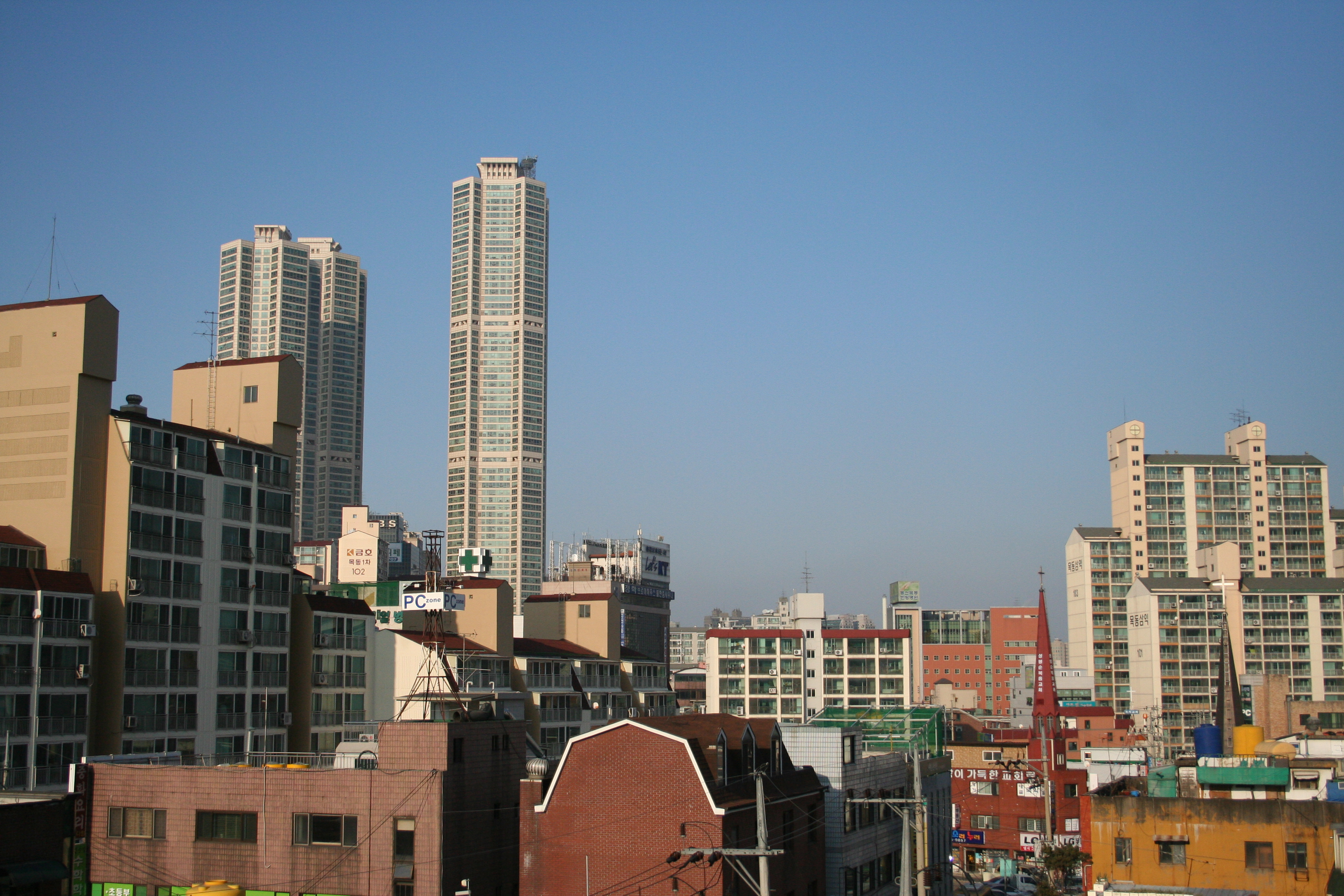

Mokdong Hyperion (Korean: 목동 하이페리온) is a group of three residential buildings located in the Mok-dong, Yangcheon-gu district of Seoul, South Korea, completed in 2003. Tower A, the tallest in the group, has 69 floors and is 256 metres (840 ft) high, making it the fifth tallest building in Seoul and the 214th tallest building in the world. The towers are used for residential housing. Tower A is the 48th tallest residential building in the world. Below the building is a Hyundai Department store, part of a chain of high end department stores in South Korea. At the time of its completion, the building was the tallest in the country but was surpassed by Samsung Tower Palace 3 – Tower G in 2004.

== Structure ==
Hyperion Tower floors B1 – B2 and 1 – 7 are a department store, while B3 – B6 are a parking lot, and floors 9 – 65 are residential.

== See also ==
- Samsung Tower Palace 3 – Tower G
- 63 Building
- Korean architecture
