= Raemian Caelitus =

- The Raemian Caelitus towers overlooking the Han River in the Yongsan District of Seoul
- Interactive map of the Raemian Caelitus area

General information
- Type: 3 residential towers
- Location: Seoul, South Korea
- Coordinates: 37°31′01.85″N 126°58′47.59″E
- Construction started: 2012
- Completed: 2015
- Owner: Samsung C&T

Height
- Architectural: Tower 101: 201 m (659 ft); Tower 102: 166 m (545 ft); Tower 103: 150 m (490 ft)

Technical details
- Floor count: Tower 1: 56; Tower 2: 42; Tower 3: 36
- Floor area: 135,082 m^{2} (1,454,010 sq ft)
- Lifts/elevators: 11

Design and construction
- Architect: Haeahn Architecture Inc. RMJM H Architecture PC Joel Sanders Architect

Raemian Caelitus, previously known as Raemian Ichon Rex, is a complex of three luxury high-rise residential towers in Seoul, South Korea. Tower 101 is Seoul's 12th tallest building and the tallest in Yongsan District. The complex was completed in 2015. Overlooking the Han River in Yongsan district of Seoul, the towers are a prominent sight from the banks of the river.
