= FKI Tower =

South Korean skyscraper

Federation Of Korean Industries Head Office Building
- Interactive map of the Federation Of Korean Industries Head Office Building area

General information
- Location: Yeouido, Seoul, South Korea
- Coordinates: 37°31′19.59″N 126°55′10.11″E
- Completed: 2014

Height
- Roof: 246 m (807 ft)
- Top floor: 245 m (804 ft)

Technical details
- Floor count: 50 (9 underground)
- Floor area: 116,037 m^{2} (1,249,010 sq ft)
- Lifts/elevators: 30

Design and construction
- Architect: Adrian Smith + Gordon Gill Architecture

Website
- tower.fki.or.kr

The FKI Tower also known by its full name Federation of Korean Industries Head Office Building is a skyscraper on Yeouido island in Seoul, South Korea. It was designed by the American architectural firm Adrian Smith + Gordon Gill Architecture. Construction started in 2010 and was completed in 2014. At 245 meters (804 ft) high, it is amongst the tallest buildings in South Korea and the 5th tallest building in Seoul. The building was awarded the 2015 Building of the Year award by American-architects.com.

== See also ==
- List of tallest buildings in Seoul
