= Yeouido =

River island in Seoul, South Korea

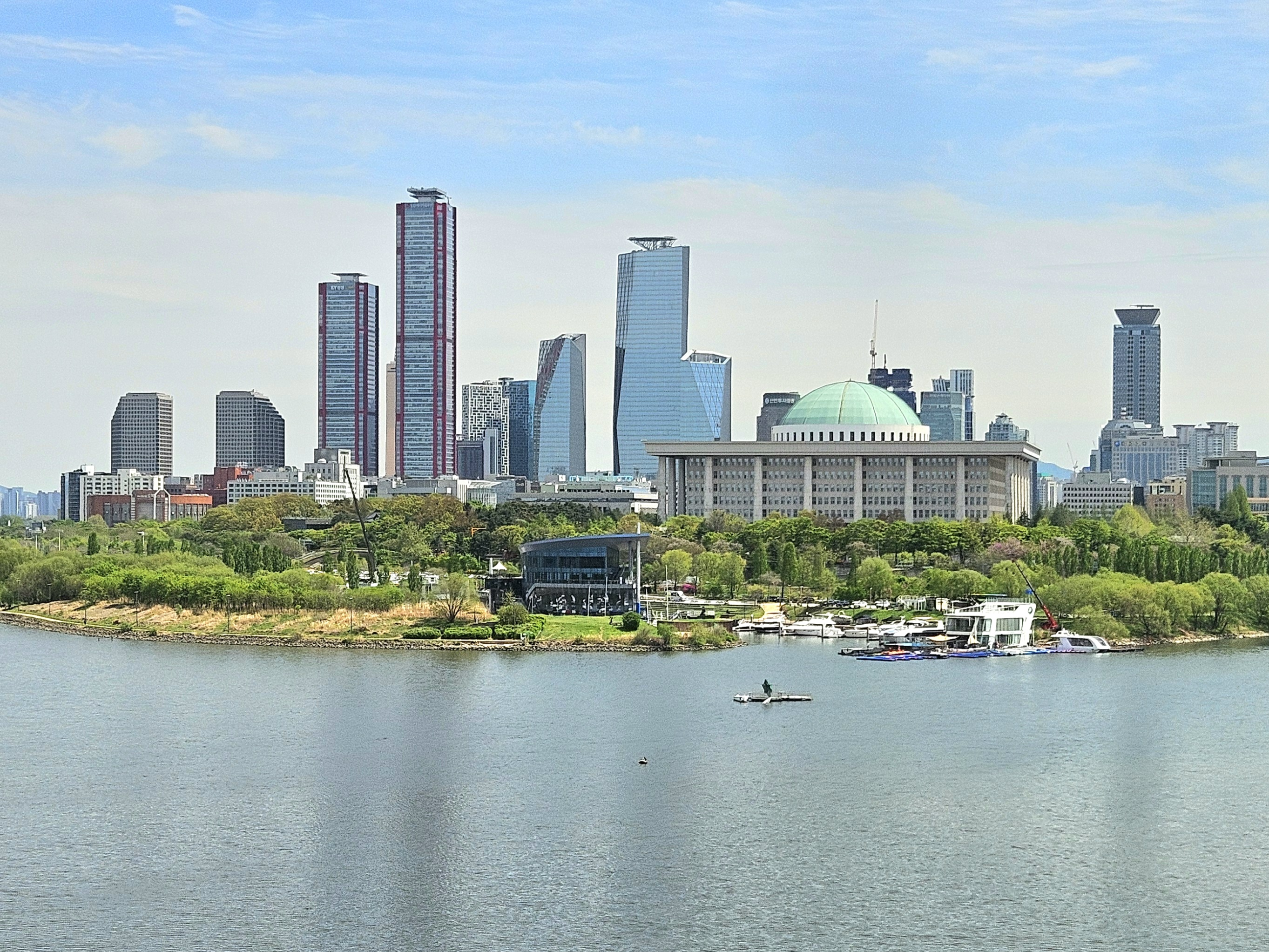
- View of Yeouido from Dangsan Railway Bridge on the Han River with the National Assembly Building in the foreground, 2025
- Interactive map of Yeouido

Geography
- Coordinates: 37°31′26″N 126°55′36″E
- Area: 8.4 km^{2} (3.2 sq mi)

Administration
- South Korea

Demographics
- Population: 34,056 (August 2025) (Note: Yeouido-dong population)

Korean name
- Hangul: 여의도
- Hanja: 汝矣島
- RR: Yeouido
- MR: Yŏŭido

Yeouido (Korean: 여의도; lit. 'Yeoui Island'), also Yoido, is a river island on the Han River in Seoul, South Korea. It is Seoul's main finance, media, and investment banking district. It is 8.4 square kilometres (3.2 mi^{2}) large and has a population of 32,674 as of August 2023.

The island is located in the Yeongdeungpo District of Seoul, and largely corresponds to the precinct of Yeoui-dong. The island contains the National Assembly Building, where the National Assembly of South Korea meets, the Korea Financial Investment Association, the large Yoido Full Gospel Church, the 63 Building, and the headquarters of LG, Korean Broadcasting System, and the Korea Exchange Center. Due mainly to its importance as a financial district and its central location, Yeouido is home to some of Seoul and South Korea's tallest skyscrapers, including the International Finance Center Seoul, Parc1 Tower, the Federation of Korea Industries Tower, as well as the iconic 63 Building.

It was uninhabited until the construction of the peninsula's first airport, Yeouido Airport. As the airport was prone to flooding, it was eventually replaced by commercial and residential construction beginning in the late 1960s.

In 2024, the metropolitan government permitted buildings with floor area ratios up to 1600% from the previous 1000%, allowing the constructions of buildings over 350 meters.

== Etymology ==
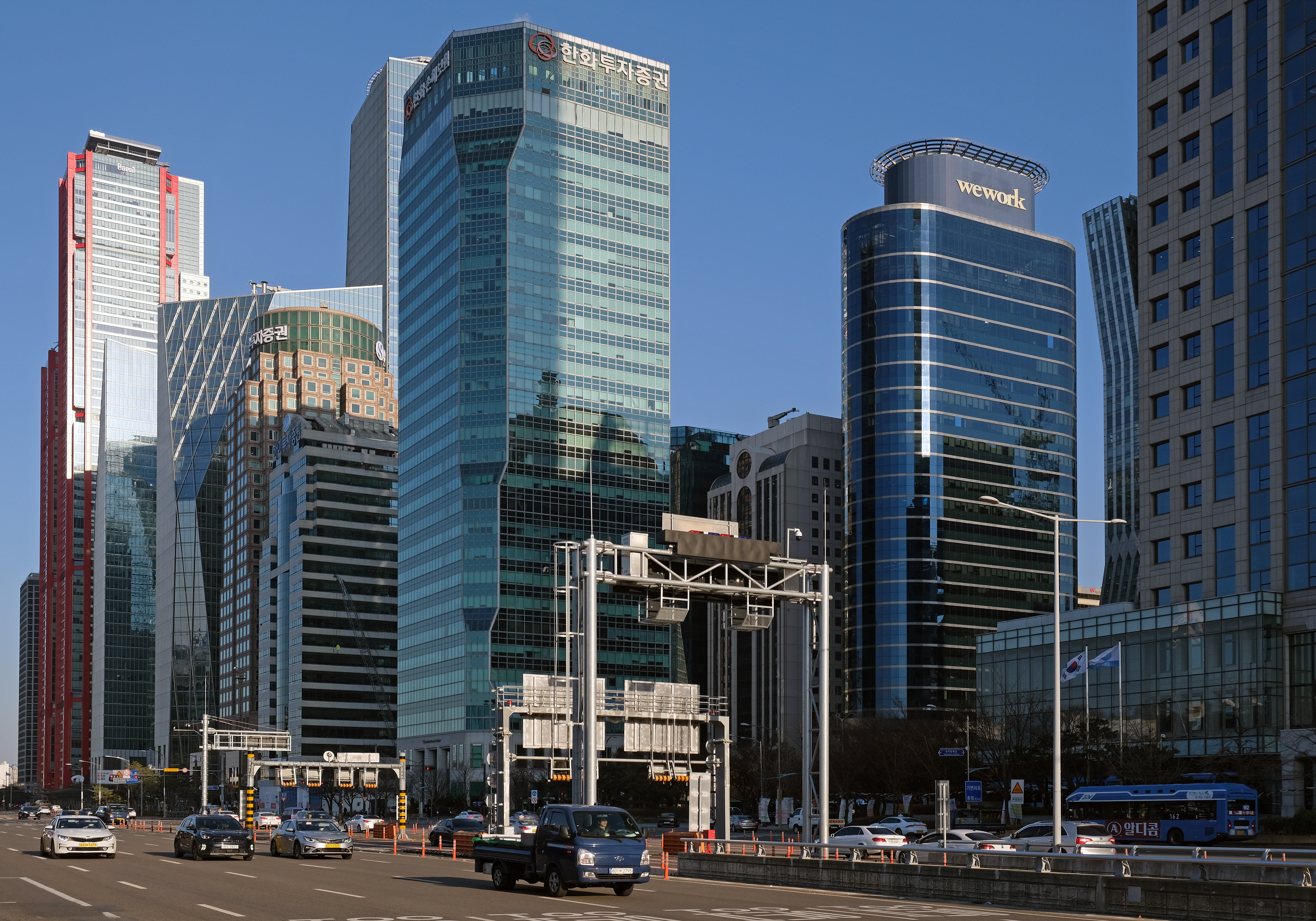
Skyscrapers on Yeouido, 2022

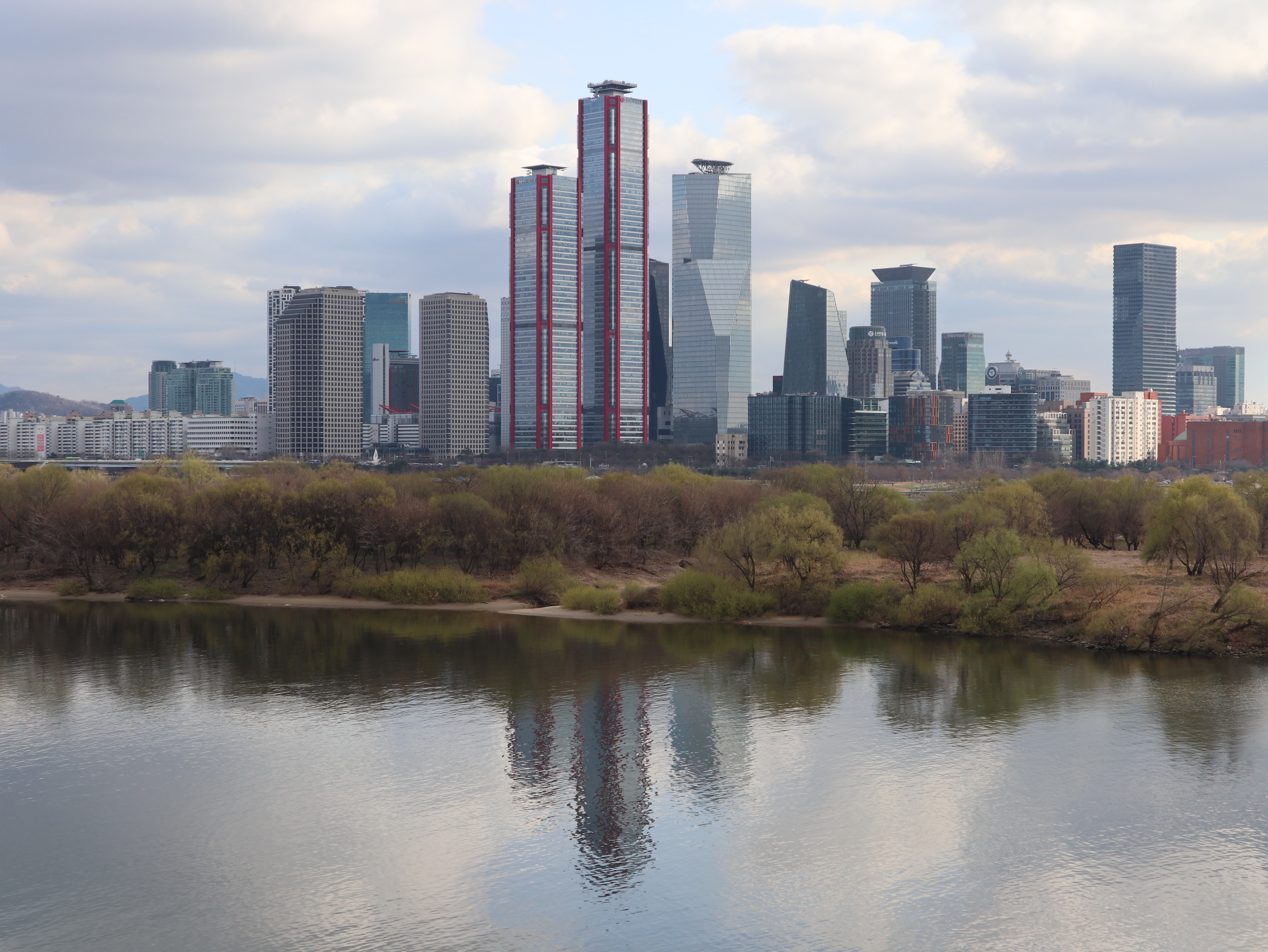
Hangang Citizen's Park and Yeouido Skyscrapers, 2024

The island went by a number of names in the Joseon period, including Yanghwado (양화도) and Nauiju (나의주). Some sources claim that "Yeouido" can literally be interpreted as "Your Island", implying that people would want to give the island away because it is useless. This is because the island was once seen as an unreliable sandy island that flooded easily. According to the Encyclopedia of Korean Culture, the name originates from jokes people would say, going along the lines of "my island, your island", about the island when it went fully under the water except for the island's 'head', being the mountain Yangmalsan, where the national assembly currently is. On the other hand, an official Seoul tourism website describes the island's name as meaning "Broad Island" (넓은 섬).

The presence of the National Assembly Building has led to Yeouido becoming a metonym for the South Korean government. The term "Yeouido saturi" (여의도 사투리, "Yeouido dialect") has entered contemporary Korean as a neologism for vague, gilded words of politicians.

== History ==
Being a vacant spot convenient to the capital of Joseon, Yeouido was used as a national pasture for sheep and goats according to a 16th-century geographical record. Yeouido remained for the most part an uninhabited sandbar prior to the construction of Korea's first airport in April 1924. The airport served both international, domestic, and military flights, and was also the site of a flight school. The airport was prone to flooding that made it unusable during the summer rainy season. Gimpo International Airport took over Yeouido's commercial flights in 1958, and Seoul Air Base took over its military functions in 1971.

Starting in the late 1960s, major housing developments were erected on the island, many of which are still in place in 2020.

The six-lane bridge connecting it to the mainland of Yeongdeungpo was built in 1970 as part of Han River development project led by President Park Chung Hee, after which followed a period of rapid development. Formerly part of Goyang, Yeouido-dong was formed as a separate entity in 1971. In 1975 the new National Assembly Building opened on the western side of the island. In 1985 the 63 building was completed and was the tallest and most well-known building in the country for many years.

== Geography ==
Yeouido has an area of 2.9 square kilometers (Yeouido-dong covers 8.4 square kilometers) and is separated from Yeongdeungpo by the small Saetgang stream. The sandy floodplain was previously used for grazing livestock.

== Politics ==
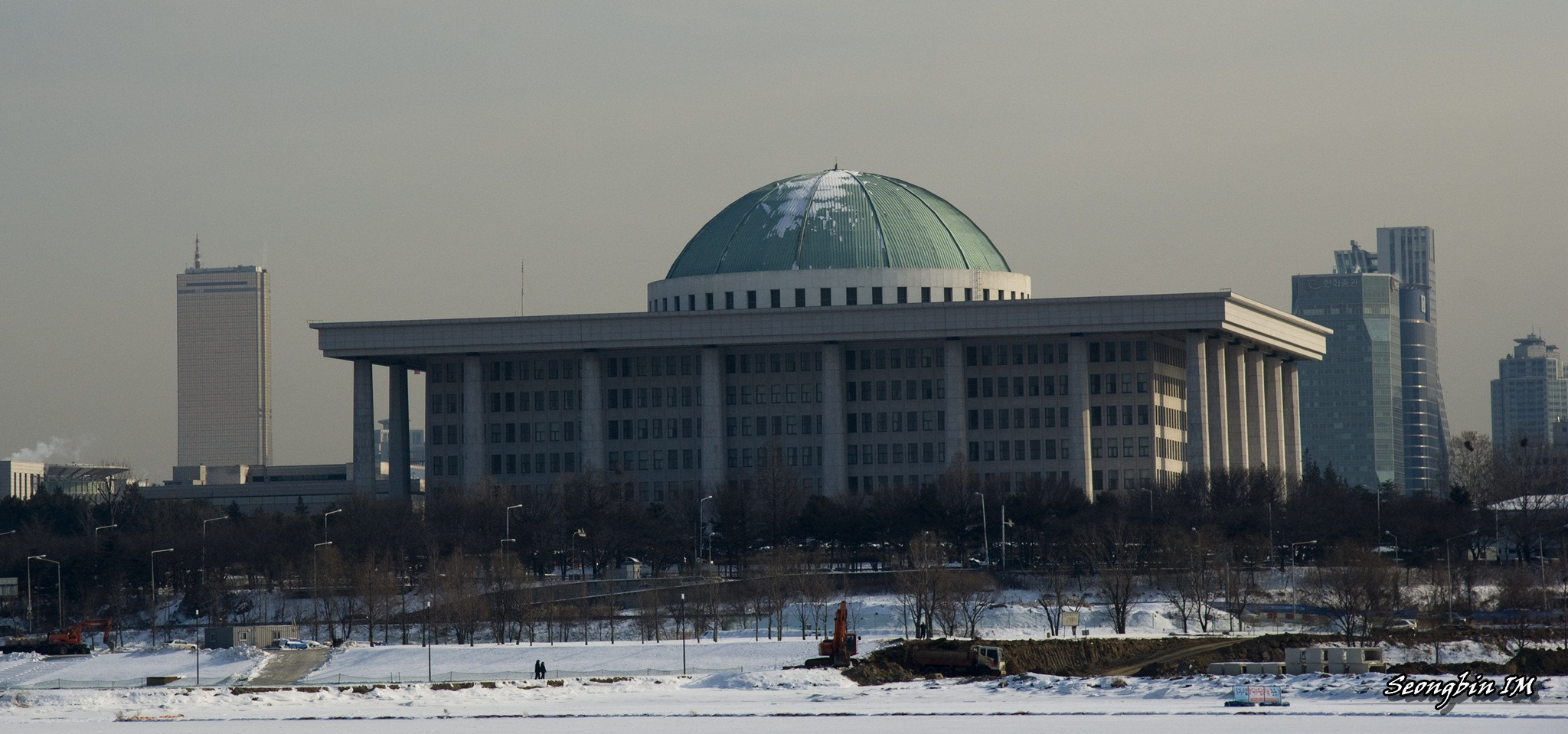
National Assembly Building with the 63 building in the background (left)

Yeouido is the center of politics in South Korea. Political organizations and their respective buildings dominate the western half of the island. Most prominently, the National Assembly Building is located to the far west of the island. Construction of the building commenced in 1969 and was completed in 1975 and sits atop the site of the former Yeouido Airport. Prior to the opening of the National Assembly Building, the seat of government was located at the General Government Building which was situated within the grounds of Gyeongbok Palace.

Due to its national importance, the area surrounding the National Assembly Building and its adjoining buildings is home to a significant police presence. Despite this, the grounds are usually open to the public and connect to the Han River Park which surrounds the site on three sides.

Most of the major South Korean political parties including the Democratic Party and the People Power Party maintain their headquarters in Yeouido, close to the National Assembly Building.

== Economics ==
Skyscrapers in Yeouido

Yeouido is considered to be the financial center of Seoul, hosting most of the country's largest financial institutions including: Industrial Bank, Kookmin Bank, Korea Stock Exchange and Federation of Korean Industries, Hana Bank, Shinhan Securities, NH Investment Securities, and Eugene Investment Securities. Most of these institutions are clustered on the eastern side of the island, opposite the political quarter on the western side.

== Public parks ==
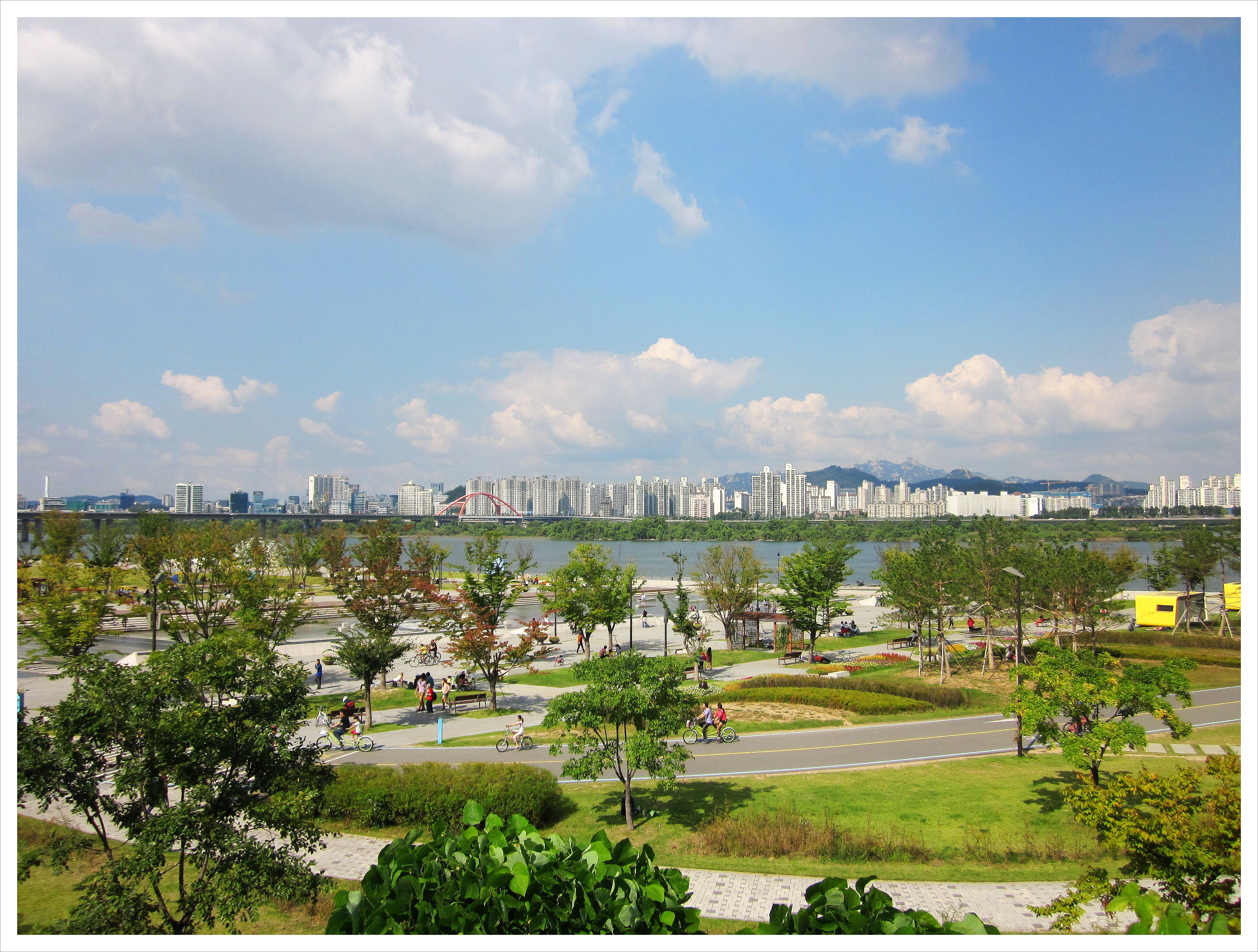
Yeouido Han River Park

Five parks are located in Yeouido. Notable among these are the Yeouido district of the Hangang Park and Yeouido Park. Yeouido Park was formed in 1999 through the reclamation of a patch of land, known as Yeouido Square or May 16 Square, which had lain under asphalt for 27 years and was used for various large public gatherings. In addition, a terminal for excursion ferries stands on the Han River shore.

== Festivals ==
- Cherry Blossom Festival - Every April, the Cherry Blossom Festival is held in the streets of Yeouido.
- Seoul International Fireworks Festival - On Saturdays of October, the Seoul International Fireworks Festival is held at Hangang Park.

== Tallest buildings ==
Rank	Name	Height	Floors	Year
1	Parc1 Tower A	333m	69	2020
2	Three IFC Office Tower	279m	55	2012
3	Parc1 Tower B	256m	53	2020
4	63 Building	249m	60	1985
5	Federation of Korean Industries Head Office Building	245m	50	2013
6	Conrad Seoul	200m	37	2012
7	One IFC Office Tower	186m	32	2012
8	Two IFC Office Tower	176m	29	2012
9	S-Trenue	154m	36	2009
10	Yeouido Richensia Tower 1	151m	40	2003
10	Yeouido Richensia Tower 2	151m	40	2003
12	Yeouido Post Tower	150m	33	2020
13	LG Twin Towers Tower 1	144m	34	1987
13	LG Twin Towers Tower 2	144m	34	1987

== Transportation ==
=== Buses ===
There are four color-coded bus lines that operate in Yeouido:

- Yellow buses run a circular route on Yeouido only
- Red buses run different routes all over Yeouido only
- Green and Blue buses connect Yeouido to numerous other points in Seoul

=== Bridges ===
There are 3 bridges between Yeouido and Mapo: Mapo Bridge, Seogang Bridge, and Wonhyo Bridge.

=== Subway ===
Seoul Subway Line 5 and Line 9 intersect at Yeouido Station. Line 5 also stops at Yeouinaru Station. Line 9 also stops at Saetgang Station and National Assembly Station.

== Gallery ==
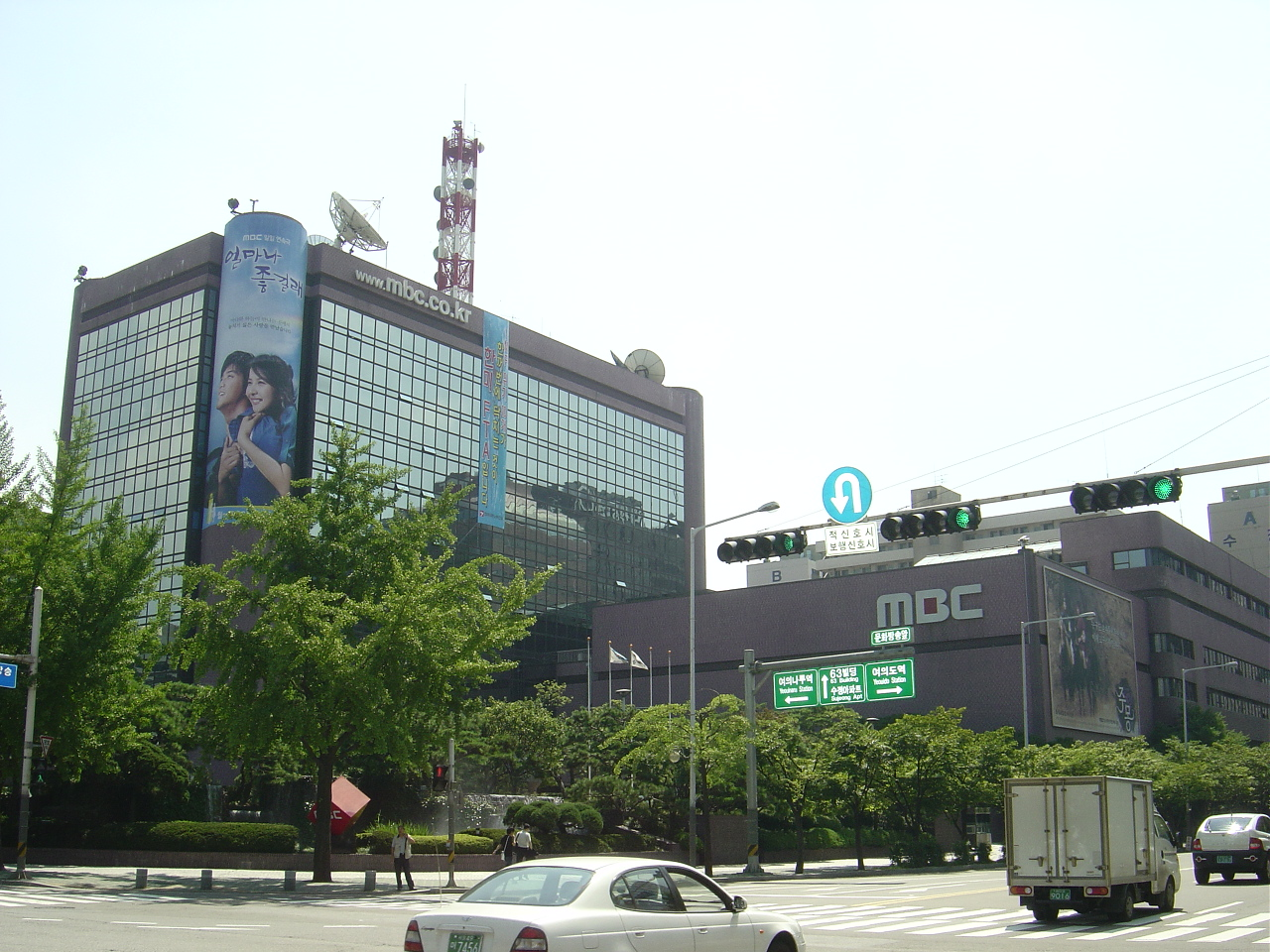
The former MBC headquarter building

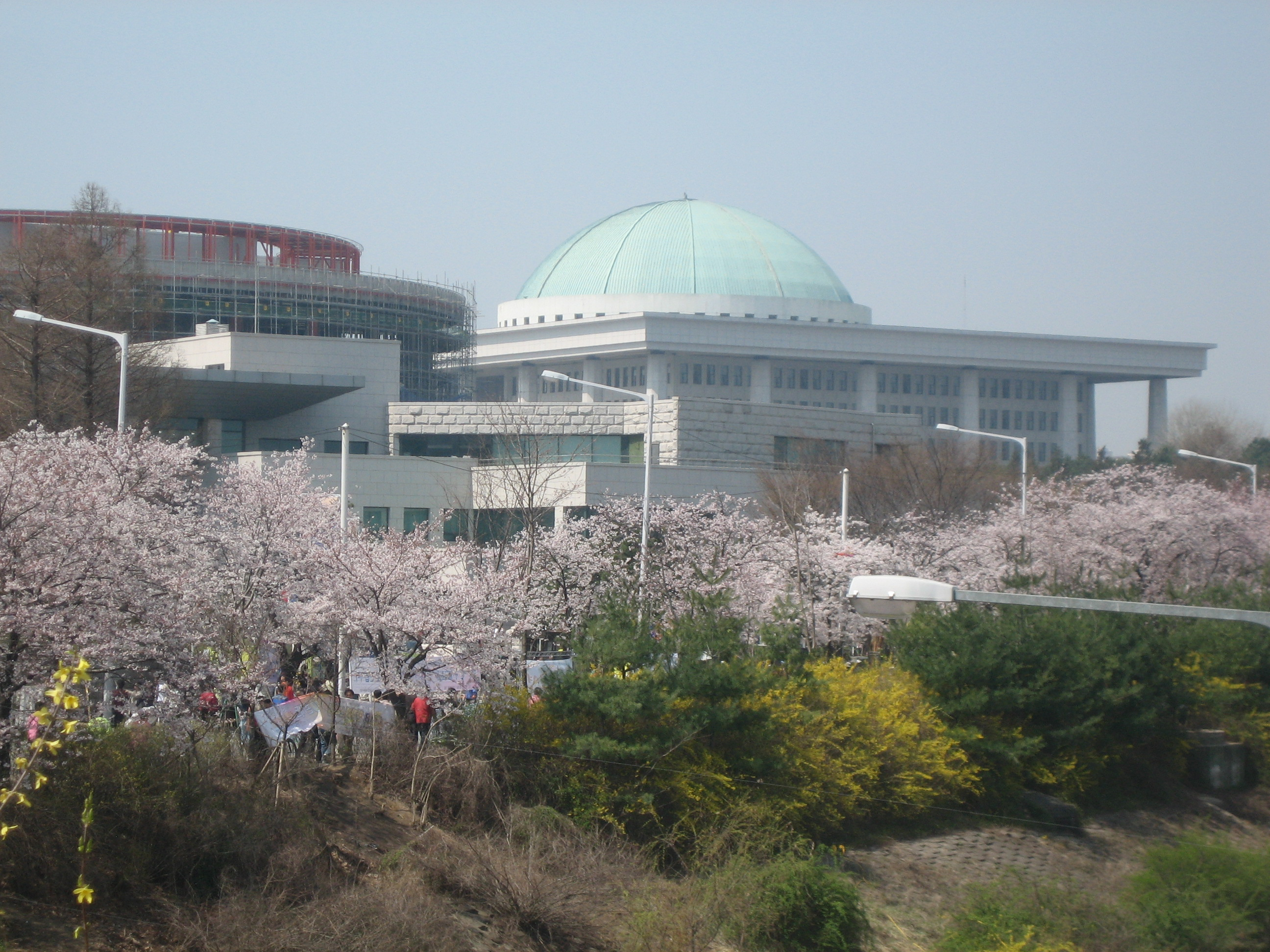
National Assembly Building

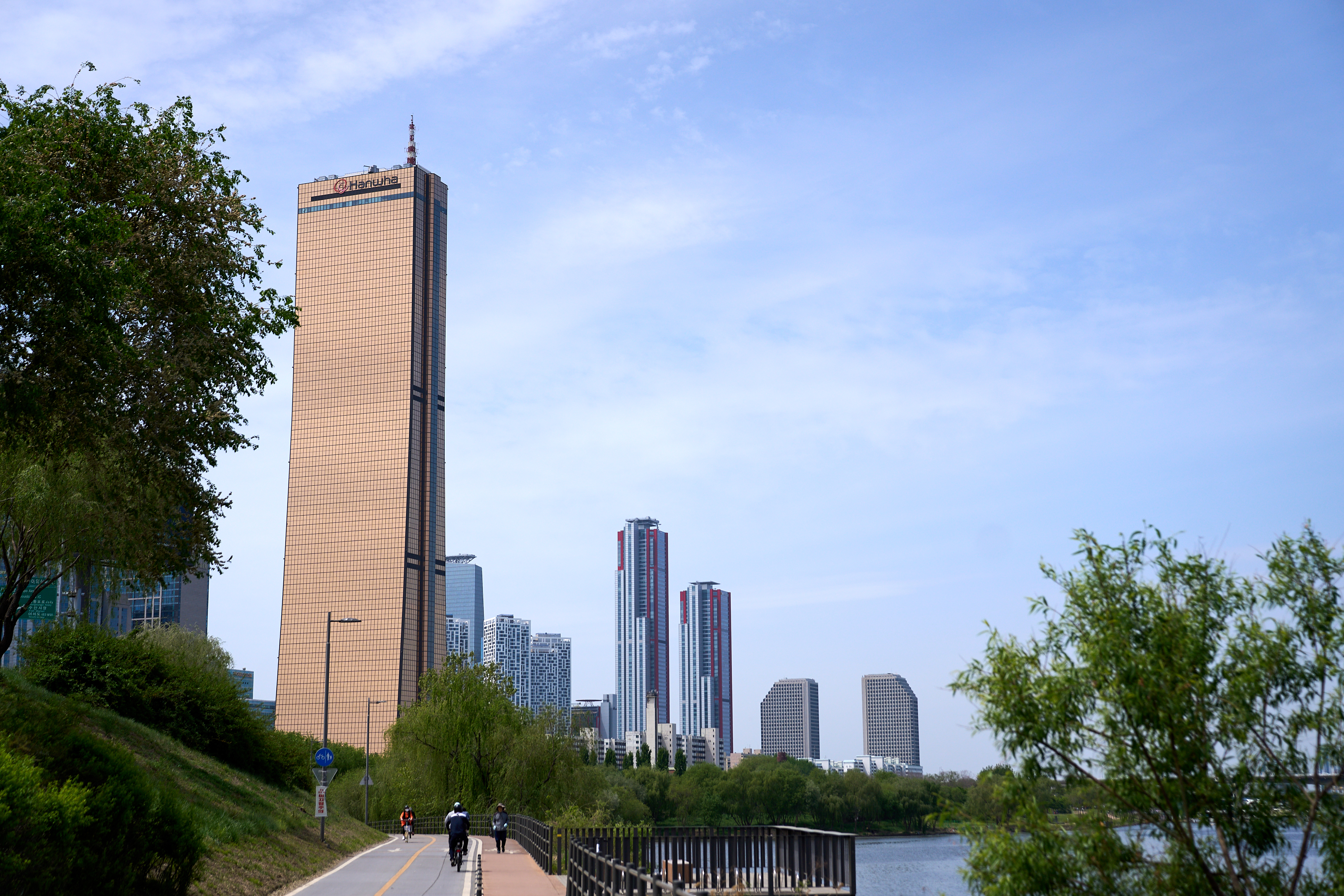
63 Building

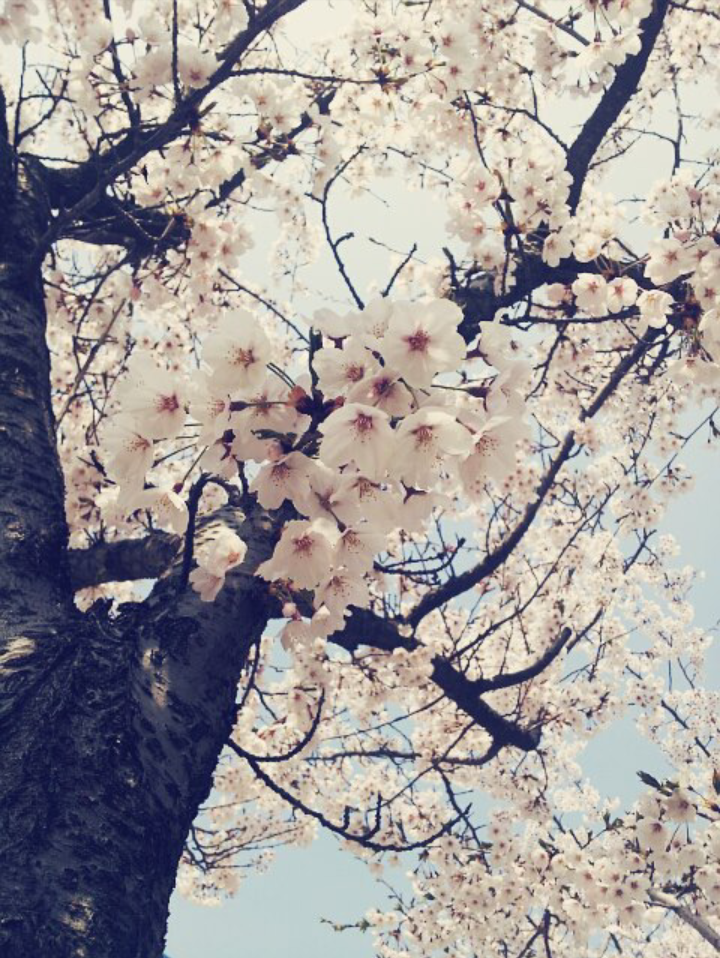
Cherry Blossom Festival

== See also ==
- Geography of South Korea
- Islands of Korea
- Han River
