= Samsung Tower Palace 3 – Tower G =

Samsung Tower Palace 3 - Tower G
- Interactive map of the Samsung Tower Palace 3 - Tower G area

General information
- Type: Residential
- Location: Gangnam-gu, Seoul, South Korea
- Coordinates: 37°29′13.79″N 127°3′11.73″E
- Construction started: 2001
- Completed: 2004

Height
- Roof: 263.7 m (865.2 ft)
- Top floor: 250 m (820.2 ft)

Technical details
- Floor count: 73

Design and construction
- Architect: Skidmore, Owings and Merrill
- Structural engineer: Skidmore, Owings & Merrill

Tower G, or simply Tower Palace Three, is a 73-floor luxury residential skyscraper in Seoul, South Korea. The structure was originally designed to be 93 stories high, but was scaled down to meet city zoning regulations. Still, it was the tallest building in the country when it was completed in 2004. It was surpassed by the Northeast Asia Trade Tower in Incheon in 2009. At 263.7 m (865 ft) high it is the eighth-tallest all-residential building in the world.

Designed by United States–based architectural firm Skidmore, Owings and Merrill, its shape is formed by three oval lobes joined together, yielding Y-shaped floor geometry that maximizes views and floor space. It pioneered the way for the buttressed core, whose potential for megatall skyscrapers found expression in UAE's Burj Khalifa.

== See also ==
- Korean architecture
- Samsung Tower Palace
