= Samsung Town =

Corporate office park in Seoul, South Korea

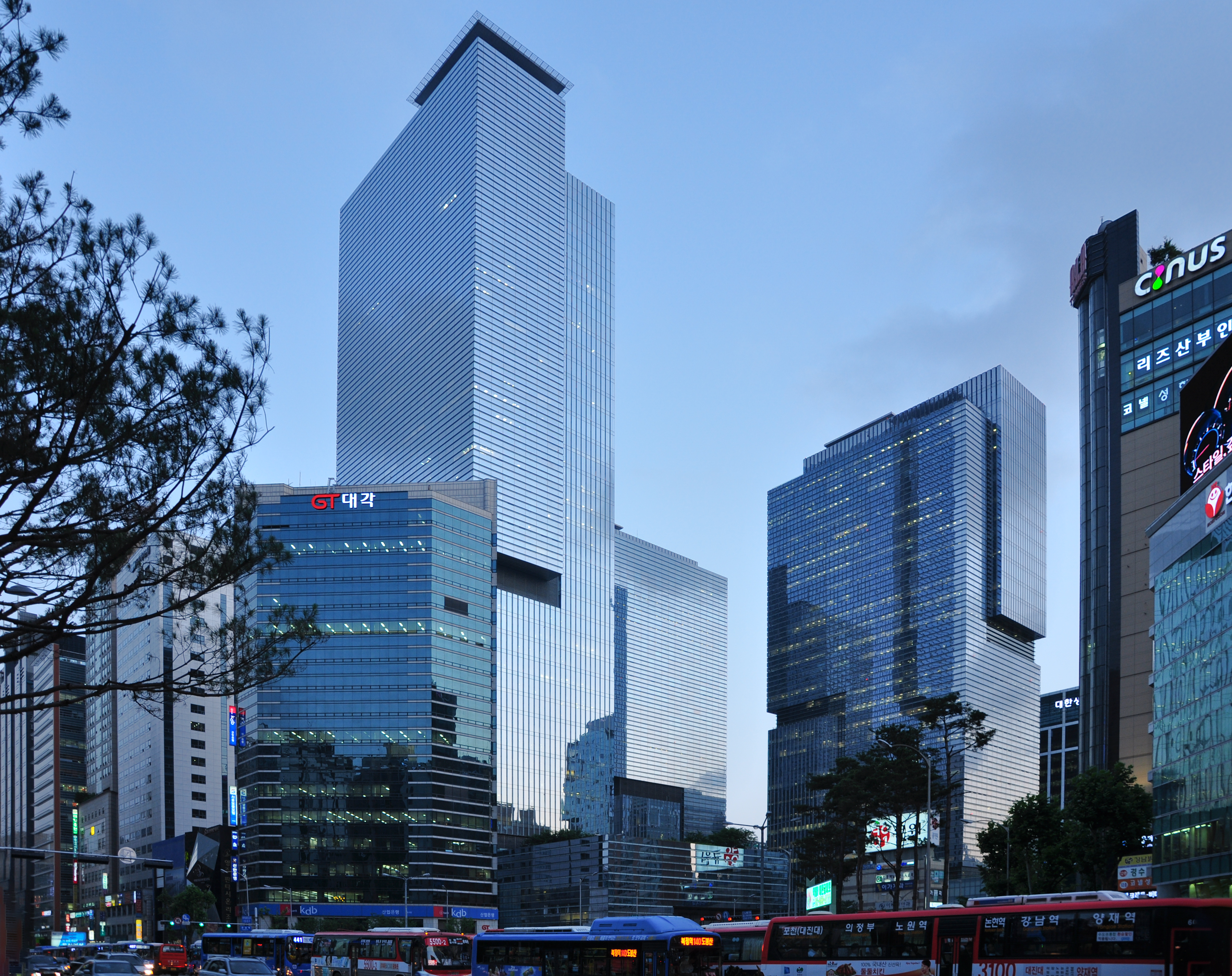

General information
- Type: Office complex
- Location: Seocho, Seoul, South Korea
- Coordinates: 37°29′48″N 127°01′36″E
- Year built: 2004–2008
- Owner: Samsung Group
- Operator: Samsung Group

Height
- Roof: 203m, 151m, 151m

Technical details
- Floor count: 44, 34, 32

Design and construction
- Architects: Kohn Pedersen Fox; SAMOO Architects & Engineers
- Developer: Samsung Group
- Main contractor: Samsung C&T Corporation

The Samsung Town (Korean: 삼성타운) is a major office park in Seocho-gu in Seoul, South Korea. It serves as the IT and electronics hub for the multinational corporation Samsung.

The building has a floor area of 110,800 m^{2} with 20,000 resident employees, and President Lee Kun-hee's office was located on the 42nd floor of Building C.

Samsung Electronics, Samsung C&T, and Samsung Life Insurance have built three buildings which are 44, 34 and 32 stories respectively. Samsung Town was designed by Kohn Pedersen Fox. Samsung Electronics and Samsung C&T have already begun to move into the houses while Samsung Life Insurance is leasing its property to Samsung Electronics and other affiliates.
