= Techno Mart =

Shopping mall chain in Seoul, South Korea

Techno Mart refers to either of two different shopping malls in Seoul, South Korea. The Gangbyeon branch, located in Gwangjin District, contains an estimated 2000 electronics and appliances stores. The Sindorim branch is located in Guro District.

== Tremors ==
On 5 July 2011, the top 19 stories of the 39-story building housing the Gangbyeon branch of Techno Mart shook violently for 10 minutes and was evacuated for two days. After study, it was determined that 17 people performing Tae Bo exercises to "The Power" in a 12th floor fitness center caused the building to vibrate by creating a mechanical resonance. The tentative conclusion was the consensus among the six professors from an architectural institute and vibration measurement experts who participated in a recreation of the event. The Architectural Institute of Korea was scheduled to release the final results of the safety inspection later in 2011.
