= Samsung Tower Palace =

Apartment towers in Seoul, South Korea

- Tower Palace view from Yangjaecheon
- Interactive map of the Samsung Tower Palace area

General information
- Type: Residential
- Location: Dogok-dong, Gangnam-gu, Seoul, South Korea
- Coordinates: 37°29′18.96″N 127°03′10.67″E
- Construction started: 2002
- Completed: 2004

Height
- Roof: 264 m (866 ft)

Technical details
- Floor count: 69

Design and construction
- Architecture firm: Samoo Architects & Engineers

The Samsung Tower Palace (Korean: 삼성 타워팰리스) is a group of seven towers, lettered A-G. They are located in Dogok-dong, Gangnam District, Seoul, South Korea. They range from 42 to 72 floors, all built between 2002 and 2004, and all used as luxury residential complexes. Tower Palace "G", which is 73 floors and 264 metres (866 feet) high, was the tallest building in Korea since 2004 but was surpassed by the Northeast Asia Trade Tower in 2009. Its shape is formed by three oval lobes joined. They are named for the company Samsung.

The builders of the Tower Palace installed high-tech security measures. Card keys issued to residents are required at all entrances and elevators. Each residence's entrance is accessed by either a key code or fingerprint identification.

Much within the buildings is highly automated. Everything from lighting, curtains, home networks and even washing machines can be pre-set to perform certain actions at a defined time or when a mode is activated from the control panels. The entire home can be controlled through the owner's mobile phone.

A helipad is located on the roof of all buildings.

== Tower Palace One ==
The first four skyscrapers (Tower A, Tower B, Tower C and Tower D) are collectively known as Tower Palace One. The tallest of the three, Tower B, stands at 234 m (768 ft) and Towers A and C are 209 m (686 ft) tall.
