= 63 Building =

Skyscraper in Seoul, South Korea

- Interactive map of the 63 Building area

General information
- Location: Yeouido, Yeongdeungpo District, Seoul; South Korea
- Coordinates: 37°31′11″N 126°56′24″E
- Opened: July 27, 1985
- Owner: Hanwha Group (Hanwha 63 City Corp.)

Height
- Antenna spire: 274 m (899 ft)
- Roof: 249.6 m (819 ft)
- Top floor: 240 m (790 ft)

Technical details
- Floor count: 63 (3 underground)
- Floor area: 166,207 m (545,299 ft)
- Lifts/elevators: 37, by Hitachi/GoldStar (modernized by Mitsubishi Electric)

Design and construction
- Architects: Harry D. Som and Helen W. Som, Som and Associates, ChunMyeong Park

Website
- https://www.63realty.co.kr/

The 63 Building (Korean: 63빌딩; RR: Yuksam Building), officially called 63 SQUARE (formerly Hanwha 63 City), is a skyscraper on the island of Yeouido, overlooking the Han River in Seoul, South Korea. At 249.6 m (819 ft) high, it was the tallest building outside North America when it was opened on July 27, 1985, and it is the second-tallest gold-clad building in the world after Grand Lisboa in Macau. It stood as South Korea's tallest building until the Hyperion Tower surpassed it in 2003, but remained the country's tallest commercial building until the Northeast Asia Trade Tower was topped-out in 2009.

The 63 Building was built as a landmark for the 1988 Summer Olympics. 63 is something of a misnomer since only 60 floors are above ground level. Floors 61–63 are restricted areas. The skyscraper is the headquarters of Korea Life Insurance, Industrial Bank of Korea Securities, and other major financial companies.

The design of the structure is based on the Hanja character for person or human being (人 or in) in a subtle reference by the designers to the business of Daehan Life, the insurance company that constructed the building.

== History ==
=== Construction ===
The 63 Building's construction broke ground in February 1980, at the height of South Korea's economic boom. It was built at a cost of 180 billion won, and construction was completed in May 1985. It was originally named the DLI 63 building, for Daehan Life Insurance. In 2000, Hanwha Group renamed the building 63 City and it became part of the group in 2002.

=== 63 Building and Present ===
It was temporarily opened on July 5, 1985, and the completion ceremony was fully opened on July 27, the same year, and was held on September 30. It was the tallest building in the world when excluding North America, beating the Sunshine 60 building in Tokyo, Japan, at the time of its completion, before the OUB centre was built in Singapore in 1987 and the Bank of China Tower in Hong Kong in 1990. On the eve of the opening ceremony of the 1988 Summer Olympics, the Olympic flame slepted at the Bonghwadae in front of the 63 Building, and it became famous around the world. Originally, it was the headquarters of Korea Life Insurance of Shindonga Group, but it was dismantled in 1997 due to the IMF, and the 63 Building was moved to Hanwha Group. The Seoul International Fireworks Festival began in 2000 and was canceled in 2001 in the aftermath of the September 11 terrorist attacks in the United States, and the event dates were adjusted in consideration of the 2002 Korea–Japan World Cup. It has been designated as an official World Cup cultural event. The 63 Building was also owned by Hanwha Group when Korea Life Insurance (currently Hanwha Life Insurance) was acquired and incorporated into Hanwha Group in September.

63 Building's new refurbishment was carried out in three stages. A total of 13,944 exterior wall glass sheets were completely replaced during the second phase of construction, especially for safety purpose. The first phase of construction began in February 2005 and was completed in July 2009, while the second phase began construction in March 2010. In 2012, the evacuation safety zone was set up on the 21st and 38th floors of the 63 Building, and was renovated in April 2013. The second phase was completed in May 2013, the third phase began construction in July 2011, and the second phase was completed on January 12, 2014, and the carpet tile construction was carried out on January 18, the same year. In May 2015, the 63 Building celebrated its 30th anniversary with a special 30% discount event to mark the 30th anniversary of the opening of the 63 Restaurant. In July 2016, the third phase of construction was completed.

== Facilities ==
The 60th floor houses the world's highest art gallery and an observation deck known as the 63 Golden Tower, that allows visitors to see as far as Incheon on clear days. The 59th floor features international restaurants called Walking in the Cloud, while the 58th floor houses family restaurants called Touch the Sky. Observation elevators equipped with windows enable passengers to view the city on their way to/from the observation deck. In the evening, some elevators are available exclusively for couples. These are known as Love Elevators which give guests a one-minute ride. The lower floors house an indoor shopping mall with approximately 90 stores, an IMAX theater, and formerly a large aquarium. A convention center and banquet hall are also housed within the building.

== In popular culture ==
The 63 Building is featured in the 2000 computer game SimCity 3000 Unlimited and is featured on its cover. In the game, it can be built as a landmark titled the 'Korea Life Building'. It also appeared in a sequel game, SimCity 4, as a DLC landmark building.

The 63 Building is featured in the 2012 disaster film The Tower, of which the building was used as director Kim Ji-hoon's inspiration to create the fictional 120-story twin tower Tower Sky complex.

== Gallery ==
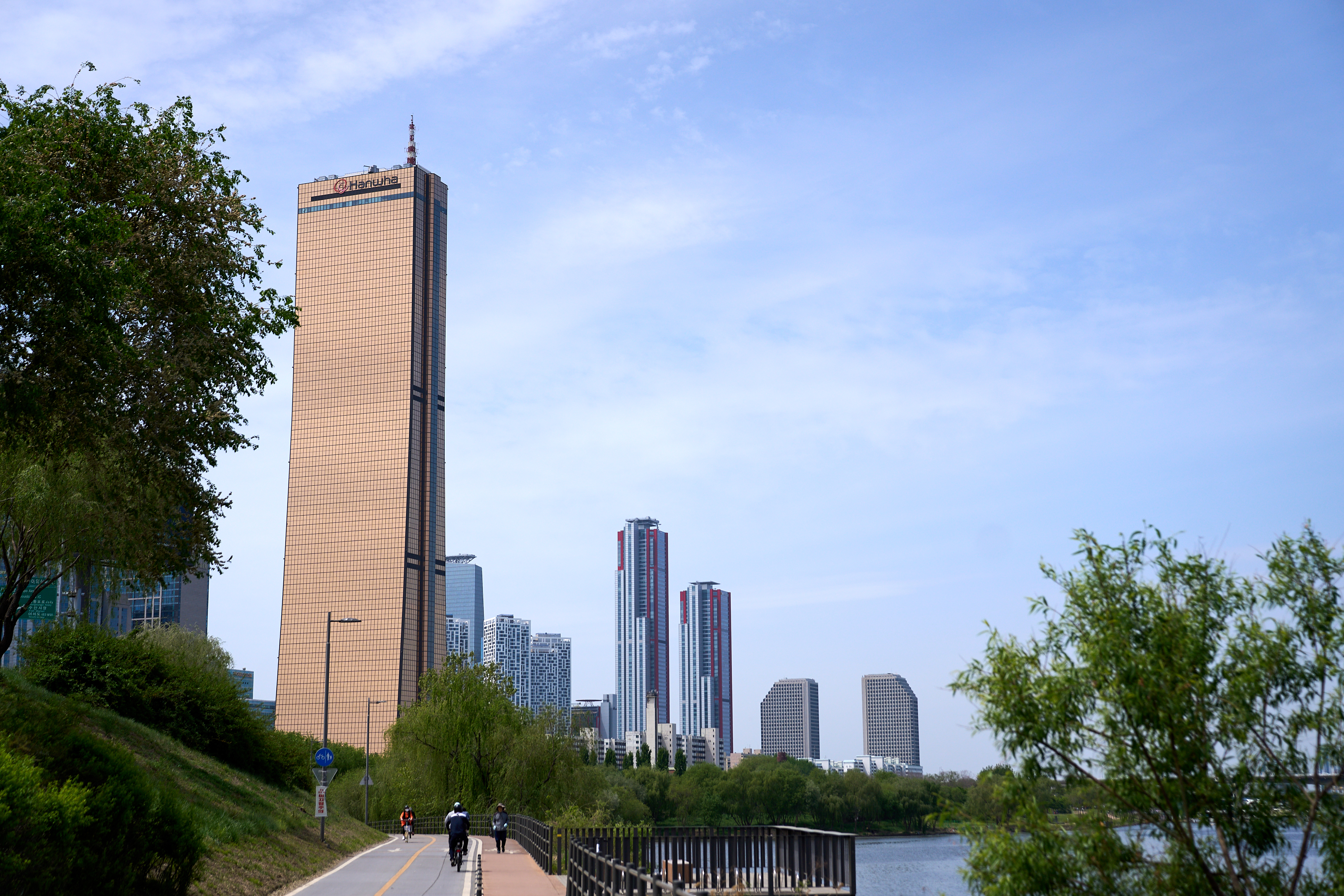
63 Building photographed in May 2023

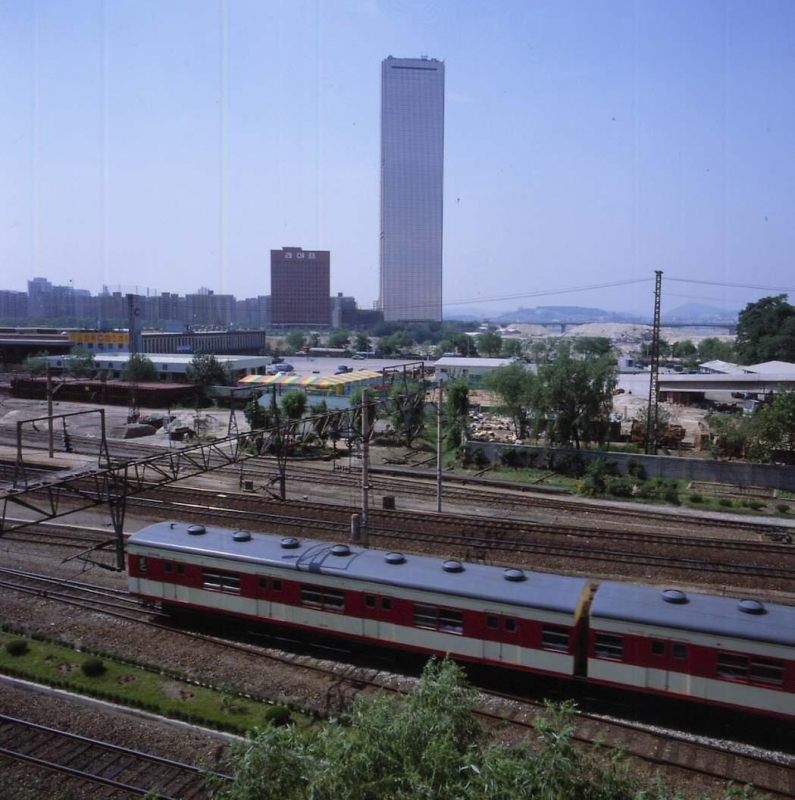
Topped-out 63 Building photographed in June 1984

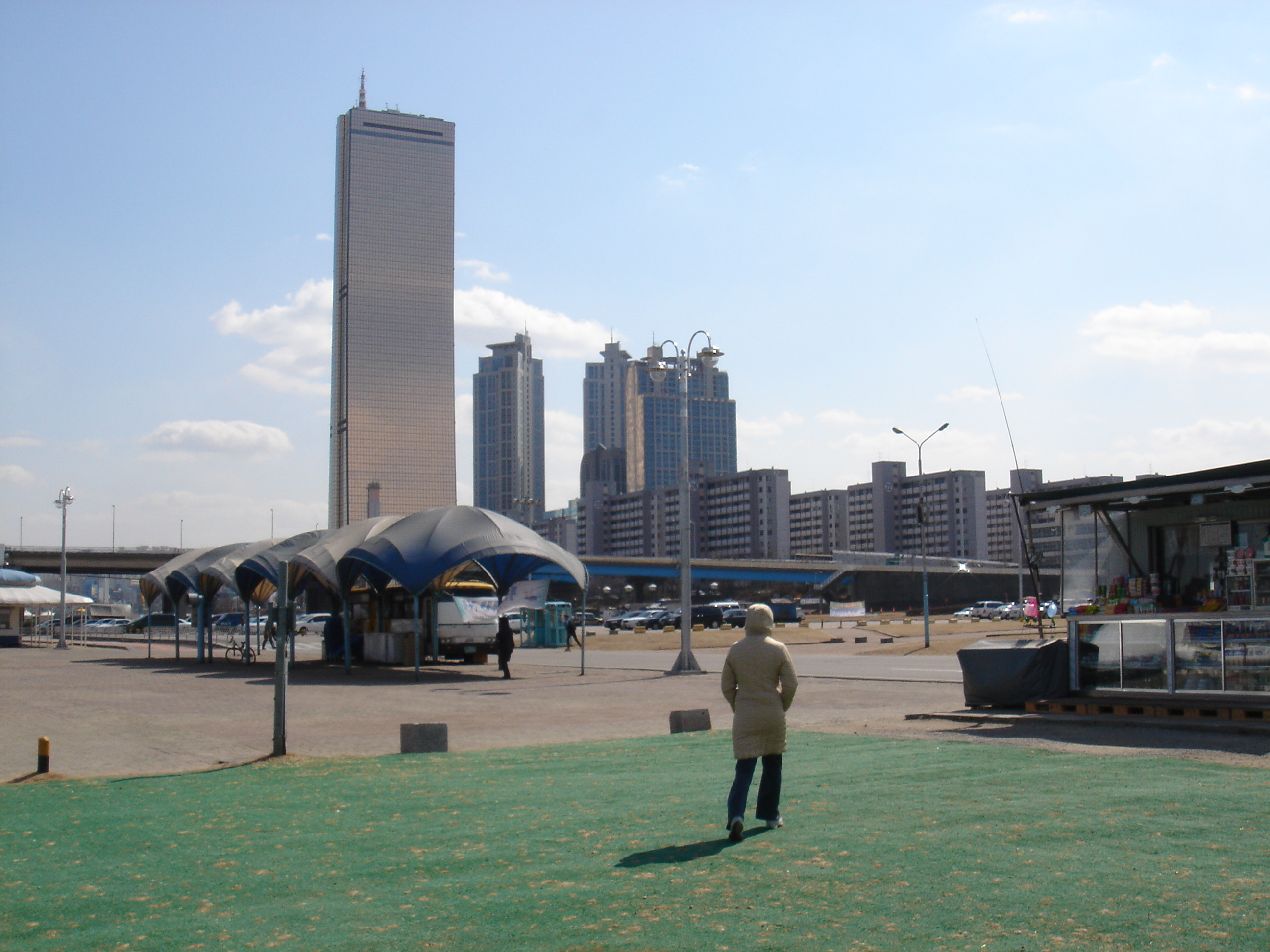

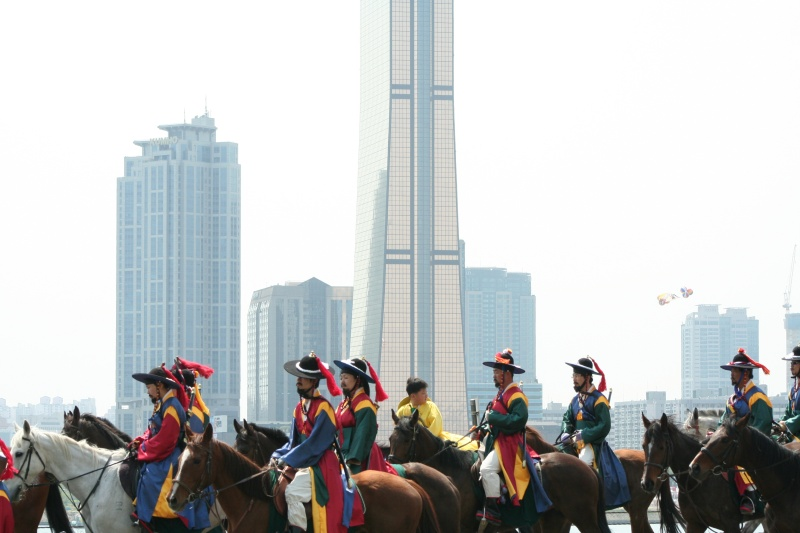
63 building was photographed in 2007.

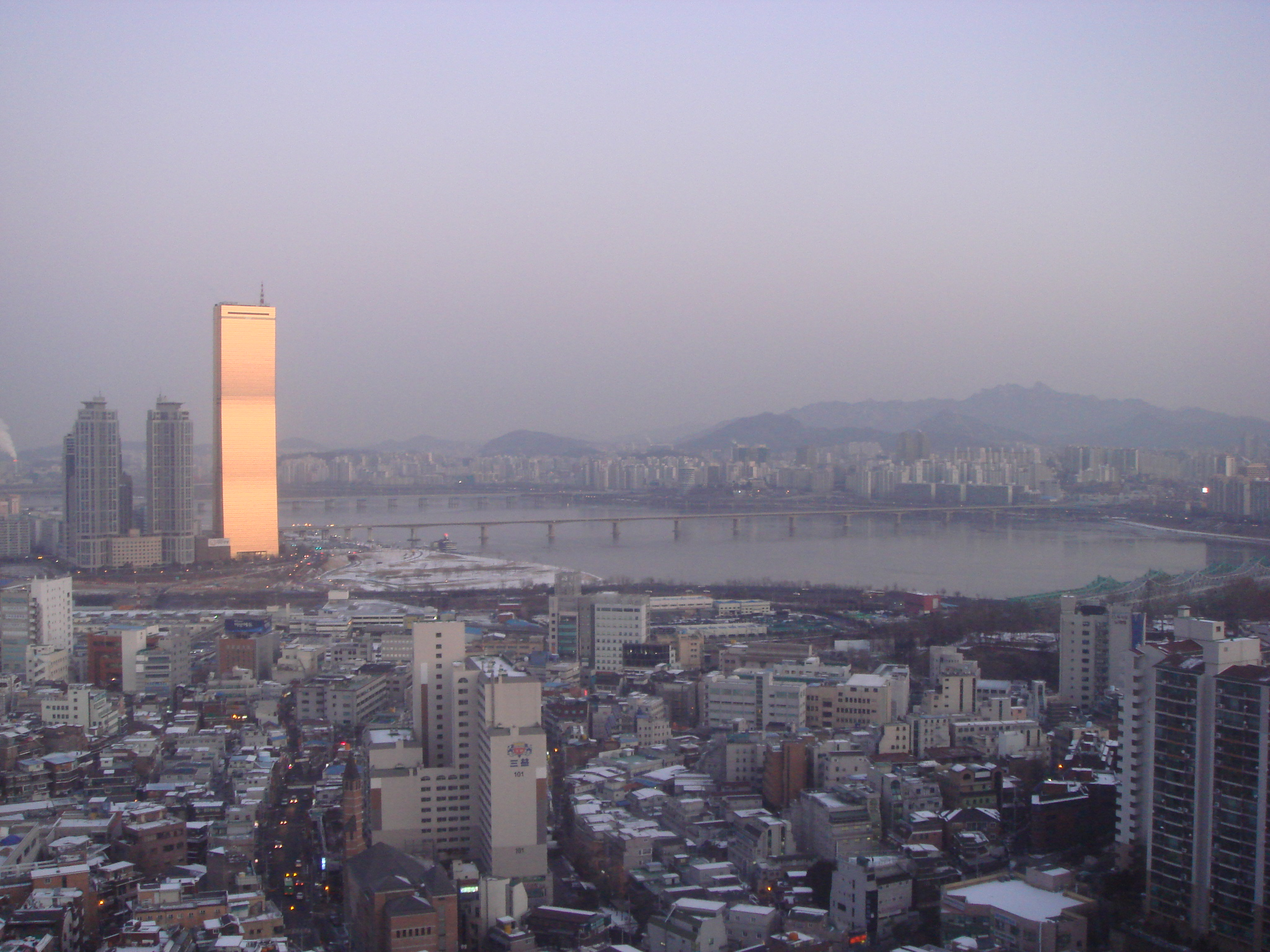
At sunrise, the 63 Building begins to glow.

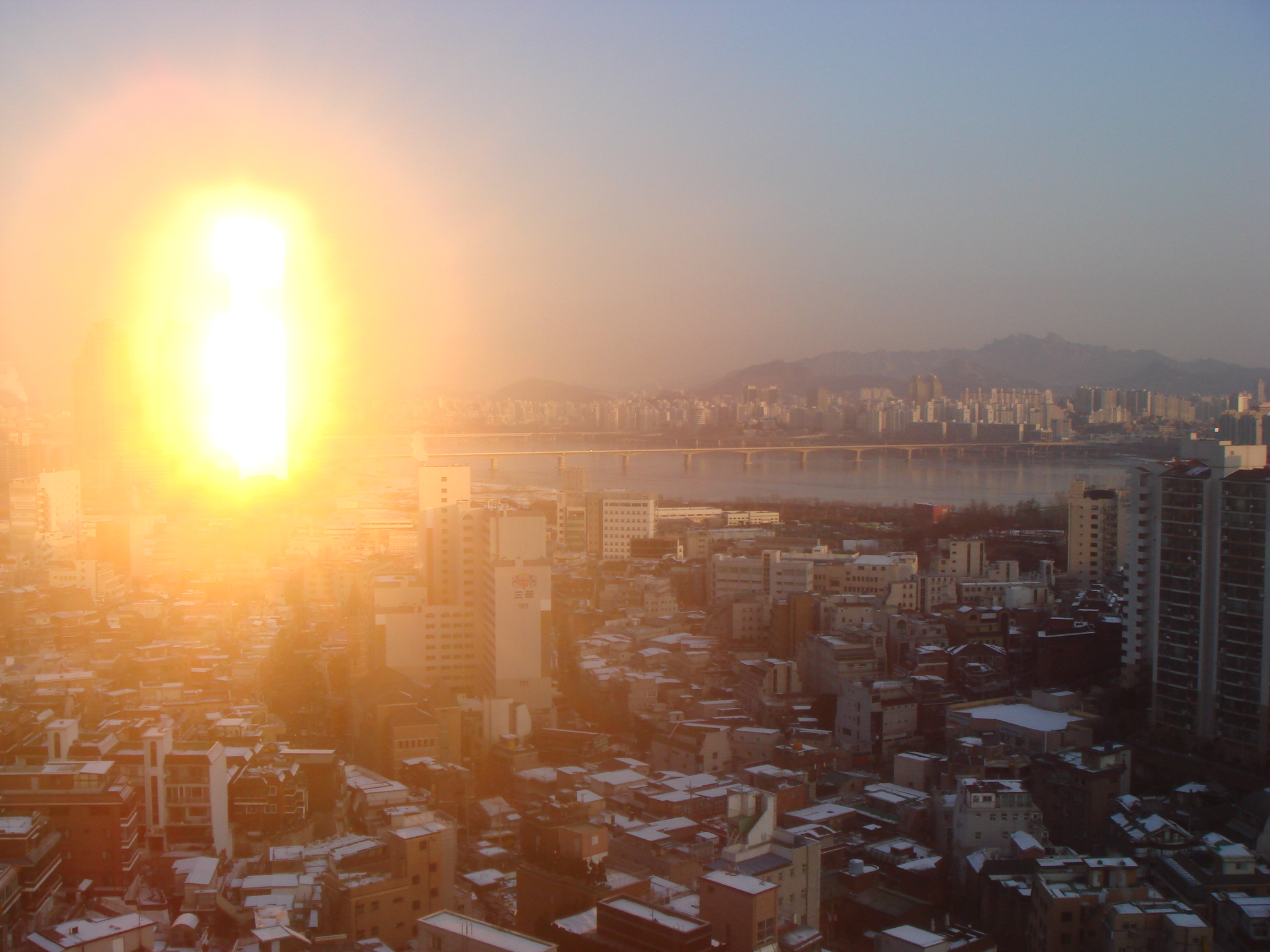
For twenty minutes at sunrise, the eastern side of the building is blindingly bright.

== See also ==
- List of skyscrapers
- Korean architecture
- Hyperion Tower
- List of tallest buildings in Seoul
- List of tallest buildings in South Korea
