= International Finance Center Seoul =

Commercial area in Seoul, South Korea

- 서울국제금융센터 (IFC 서울)
- Interactive map of the International Finance Center Seoul area

General information
- Status: Completed
- Type: Offices, Retail, Hotel
- Location: 10, Gukjegeumyung-ro, Yeongdeungpo-gu, Seoul, South Korea
- Coordinates: 37°31′30.79″N 126°55′33.69″E
- Construction started: 2007; 19 years ago
- Completed: 2012; 14 years ago
- Owner: Brookfield Asset Management

Height
- Antenna spire: 283m
- Roof: 279m
- Top floor: 247m

Technical details
- Floor count: 55
- Floor area: 5,400,000 sq ft (120 acres)

Design and construction
- Architect: Arquitectonica
- Developer: AIG; Seoul Metropolitan Government
- Main contractor: Hyundai E&C; Daelim E&C

Other information
- Public transit access: Yeouido

Website
- www.ifcseoul.com

International Finance Center Seoul (Korean: 서울국제금융센터), commonly known as IFC Seoul (아이 에프 시 서울), is a mixed-use integrated commercial development in Yeouido-dong, Yeongdeungpo District, Seoul, South Korea. The IFC project is one of the first large-scale developments in Korea, led by an international consortium. It was officially launched in 2005, and is part of Seoul Metropolitan Government's plan to rejuvenate the Yeouido area as a regional financial hub.

The 500,000-square-meter development is made up of IFC Office Towers, Conrad Seoul Hotel and IFC Mall Seoul, designed by Arquitectonica. Completed in 2012, it is the 2nd tallest building in Seoul, and the 6th tallest in Korea.

The IFC Seoul is connected to Yeouido Station on Line 5 and Line 9.

== Structures ==
=== Office Towers ===
Opened in 2011 consists of three office towers: The 32-story One IFC Office Tower, the 29-story Two IFC Office Tower, the 55-story Three IFC Office Tower, and the tallest of the three at 284 metres.

=== IFC Mall ===
Opened on 30 August 2012

=== Conrad Seoul ===
Opened on 12 November 2012

The Conrad Seoul Hotel is a luxury five-star hotel located in one of the four towers in the IFC complex. It is part of the Conrad Hotels & Resorts, a premier luxury brand of Hilton Hotel Group, helmed by general manager Mark Meaney, and the first Conrad hotel in Korea.

The lobby is flanked by a 36.5-meter spiral staircase, connecting the lobby through to the fifth floor. The hotel has 434 guestrooms and suites spread throughout 38 stories. The standard rooms are 48 square meters and the penthouse is 288 square meters. Other facilities include ballrooms and meeting rooms, as well as Pulse8, a 24-hour gym opened all year round.

International Finance Center complex

Tower two from ground level

== See also ==
- List of tallest buildings in Seoul
- List of tallest buildings in South Korea
- Busan International Finance Center
- International Finance Centre (Hong Kong)
- Shanghai IFC
