= List of Korean architects =

This is a list of Korean architects.

Name	Hangul	Hanja	Year	Note	Link
Kim Swoo Geun	김수근	金壽根	1931–1986	Seoul Olympic Stadium, Cheongju National Museum	
Kim Yun-gi	김윤기	金允基	1904–1979		
Kim Jong-seong	김종성	金鍾星	1988		
Kim Joong Up	김중업	金重業	1922–1988		
Minsuk Cho	조민석		1966		
Min Hyun Sik	민현식	閔賢植	1946		
Park Dong-jin	박동진	朴東鎭	1899–1981		
Seung H-Sang	승효상	承孝相	1952	Commune by the Great Wall	
Kyu Sung Woo	우규승	禹圭昇	1941		

== See also ==
- Korean architecture
- Architecture of South Korea
- List of tallest buildings in Seoul
