= Hyun-sik =

- Hangul: 현식
- RR: Hyeonsik
- MR: Hyŏnsik

Hyun-sik is a Korean given name.

People with this name include:

- Im Hyun-sik (born 1945), South Korean actor
- Min Hyun-sik (born 1946), South Korean architect
- Jo Hyun-sik (born 1983), South Korean actor
- Ahn Hyun-sik (born 1987), South Korean football player
- Im Hyun-sik (singer) (born 1992), South Korean singer, member of boy band BtoB
- Lee Hyeon-sik, South Korean handball player

Fictional characters with this name include:

- Hyun-shik, in 2000 South Korean film The Isle
- Jung Hyun-sik, in 2012 South Korean film Confession of Murder
