= 31 Building =

- 삼일빌딩
- 31 Building in 2013
- Interactive map of the 31 Building area

General information
- Type: Office
- Architectural style: International Style
- Location: 85, Cheonggyecheon-ro, Jongno-gu, Seoul, South Korea
- Coordinates: 37°34′06.96″N 126°59′13.92″E
- Completed: 1970; 56 years ago
- Renovated: 2020; 6 years ago

Height
- Roof: 110 m (360 ft)

Technical details
- Floor count: 31 (equivalent)

Design and construction
- Architect: Kim Chung-up
- Designations

Seoul Future Heritage
- Reference no.: 2013-003

31 Building (Korean: 31빌딩), also called Samil Building, is an office building in Seoul, South Korea. Completed in 1970, the 31 Building was the tallest building in Seoul until 1979, when Lotte Hotel Seoul was completed.

The architect of the 31 Building was Kim Chung-up, a famous architect in South Korea.

It was selected as 'Seoul Future Heritage' because it is considered a valuable building in the history of architecture in Seoul.

== See also ==
- List of tallest buildings in South Korea
