= Kim Chung-up =

South Korean architect (1922–1988)

- 김중업
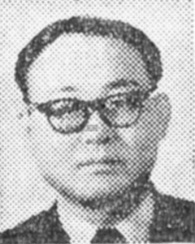
- Born: March 9, 1922; Pyongyang, Heian'nan Province, Korea, Empire of Japan
- Died: May 11, 1988 (aged 66); Seoul, South Korea
- Occupation: Architect
- Buildings: 31 Building

- Kim Chung-up
- Hangul: 김중업
- Hanja: 金重業
- RR: Gim Jungeop
- MR: Kim Chungŏp

Kim Chung-up (Korean: 김중업; Hanja: 金重業; 9 March 1922 – 11 May 1988) was a Korean architect and educator.

== Early life and education ==
Kim was born in Pyongyang in 1922. He graduated from Yokohama Technical High School, where he studied Beaux-Arts architecture. After graduation, he worked at the Matsuda & Hirata Design office in Tokyo. Later, he returned to Korea and became an assistant professor at Seoul National University College of Engineering. After the outbreak of the Korean War, he moved to Busan and built a network with various artists, including Kim Whan-ki and Lee Jung-seob.

== Career ==
In 1952, he was selected as a Korean delegate for the first UNESCO International Conference of Artists, which took place in Venice, Italy. During his stay in Venice, he had the chance to meet with Le Corbusier, the renowned Swiss-French architect. This meeting led him to work in Le Corbusier's atelier in Paris for three years and two months.

== Projects ==
- 1958 Sogang University Administration Building, Seoul
- 1960 Embassy of France, Seoul
- 1965 Dr. Seo's Women's Clinic
- 1966 United Nations Memorial Cemetery Main Gate, Busan
- 1966 Jeju National University Administration Building, Jeju (demolished)
- 1969 31 Building, Seoul
- 1985 World Peace Gate, Seoul

== Award ==
Kim was awarded the 1962 Cultural Award from Seoul Metropolitan Government in 1962, Chevalier from the France government in 1965, Order of Industrial Service Merit from the South Korea government in 1985.

== See also ==
- Kim Swoo Geun
- Architecture of South Korea
- 31 Building
