= Kim Swoo-geun =

South Korean architect (1931–1986)

- Kim in front of Seoul Olympic Stadium in Seoul
- Born: February 20, 1931; Chongjin, Kankyōhoku Province, Korea, Empire of Japan
- Died: June 14, 1986 (aged 55); Seoul, South Korea
- Education: Tokyo University of the Arts; University of Tokyo
- Occupation: Architect
- Buildings: Seoul Olympic Stadium
- Website: kimswoogeun.org

- Kim Swoo-geun
- Hangul: 김수근
- Hanja: 金壽根
- RR: Gim Sugeun
- MR: Kim Sugŭn

Kim Swoo Geun (Korean: 김수근; February 20, 1931 – June 14, 1986) was a prominent South Korean architect, educator, publisher and patron of artists. Along with architect Kim Chung-up (김중업), he is recognised as a significant contributor in the history of Korean architecture. With his support for diverse art genres of Korean culture, he was referred to as Lorenzo de Medici of Seoul by TIME in 1977.

== Biography ==
Kim Swoo Geun was born the first son of Kim Yong-hwan (김용환) and Kim Usudal (김우수달) in Sinap-dong (신압동), Chongjin, North Hamgyong Province. While in his second year at Kyunggi Public Middle School (경기공립중학교), Kim was introduced to architecture by a US soldier who tutored him in English.

After his graduation from the school in 1950 and Kim entered Seoul National University, majoring in architecture. In 1952, during the Korean War, he withdrew from the school and went abroad to Japan where he studied modern architecture at Tokyo National University of Fine Arts and Music. During his study at this school, he interned at Hirada Matsuda (松田平田)'s architectural firm. In 1960 he received a master's degree in architecture from Tokyo University where he finished his doctoral course as well.

In 1959, he won the competition for the National Assembly Building of South Korea, but his proposal was not realized due to the political situation at that time. In 1960, he returned to his country with his Japanese wife Michiko Yajima (矢島道子). He would eventually father three children with her. In 1961 he founded his architectural firm, "Kim Swoo Geun Planning and Design" (김수근 건축사무소), the predecessor of the current SPACE group. At the same time, he also began to teach at the architecture department of Hongik University.

Kim designed over 200 projects inside and outside of South Korea during his lifetime. His representative works include "SPACE Group building" (공간 사옥, 1978), "Masan Yangdeok Catholic Church" (마산양덕성당 1979), "Jinju National Museum" (진주국립박물관 1986) and "Olympic Main Stadium" (올림픽 경기장 1987), which feature his characteristic view of architecture as well as Korean traditional elements.

Kim commenced publishing the monthly SPACE (월간 공간) in 1966, the first general art journal of South Korea which contributes to recording and distributing Korean culture. Kim also established SPACE Love (공간사랑) in 1978, a small theater inside of the Space group building and built the SPACE Gallery in 1972, all of which has played an important role for numerous South Korean cultural campaigns. With his contributions crossing over into many diverse genres, Kim is regarded a seminal cultural activist, trying to integrate architecture and other genres of artistic expression.

After Kim Swoo Geun died in 1986, a victim of liver cancer at the age of 55, the Kim Swoo Geun Foundation (김수근문화재단) was established in his memory.

== Recognition ==
According to Park Gil-ryong, a professor of Kukmin University, Kim was the first in South Korea to proclaim that architecture has to have its own concept and philosophy. The architect Min Hyun Sik said Kim Swoo Geun lived with the consciousness of how to effectively convey and adapt Korean tradition into contemporary architecture. It was his grand obsession. His achievement as an educator was in mentoring Kim Won, Ryu Chun-su, Min Hyun Sik, Lee Jong-ho, Seung Hyo-sang into being prominent architects, regarded as significant as well.

== Selected works ==
- 1963 Freedom Center (자유센터) in Jangchung-dong, Jung District, Seoul
- 1967 Buyeo National Museum in Buyeo, South Chungcheong Province
- 1967 Seun Sangga, Jongno District, Seoul
- 1969 Tower Hotel (타워호텔) in Jangchung-dong, Jung District, Seoul
- 1970 Korea Exhibition Pavilion at Expo '70 (오사카 엑스포 한국관) in Osaka, Japan
- 1971 SPACE Group Building (공간 사옥) in Wonseo-dong, Jongno District, Seoul
- 1977 Seoul Olympic Stadium, in Jamsil, Songpa District, Seoul
- 1979 Cheongju National Museum, in Cheongju, North Chungcheong Province
- 1979 Munye Center and Fine Arts Center (종합문예회관, currently Arko Arts Museum) in Marronnier Park, Jongno District
- 1979 Yangdeok Catholic Church (마산양덕성당) in Masan, South Gyeongsang Province
- 1980 Kyungdong Presbyterian Church (경동교회) in Jangchung-dong, Jung District, Seoul
- 1983 Embassy building of the United States in Seoul on Sejongno in Jongno District, Seoul
- 1984 National Science Museum, South Korea in Yuseong District, Daejeon
- 1985 Bulgwang-dong Catholic Church (불광동성당) in Bulgwang-dong, Eunpyeong District, Seoul

== Gallery ==
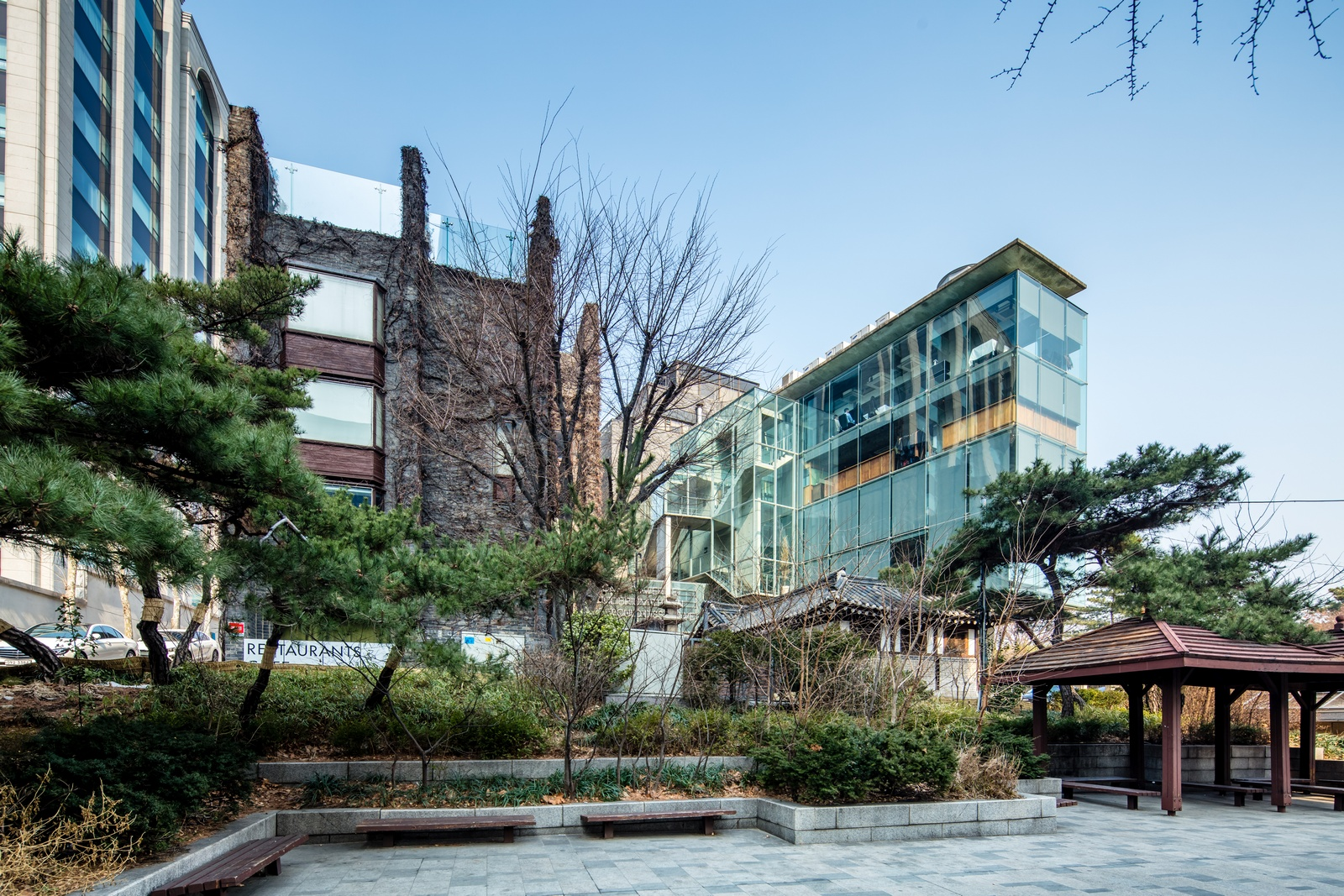
Space Group Building

Seoul Olympic Stadium

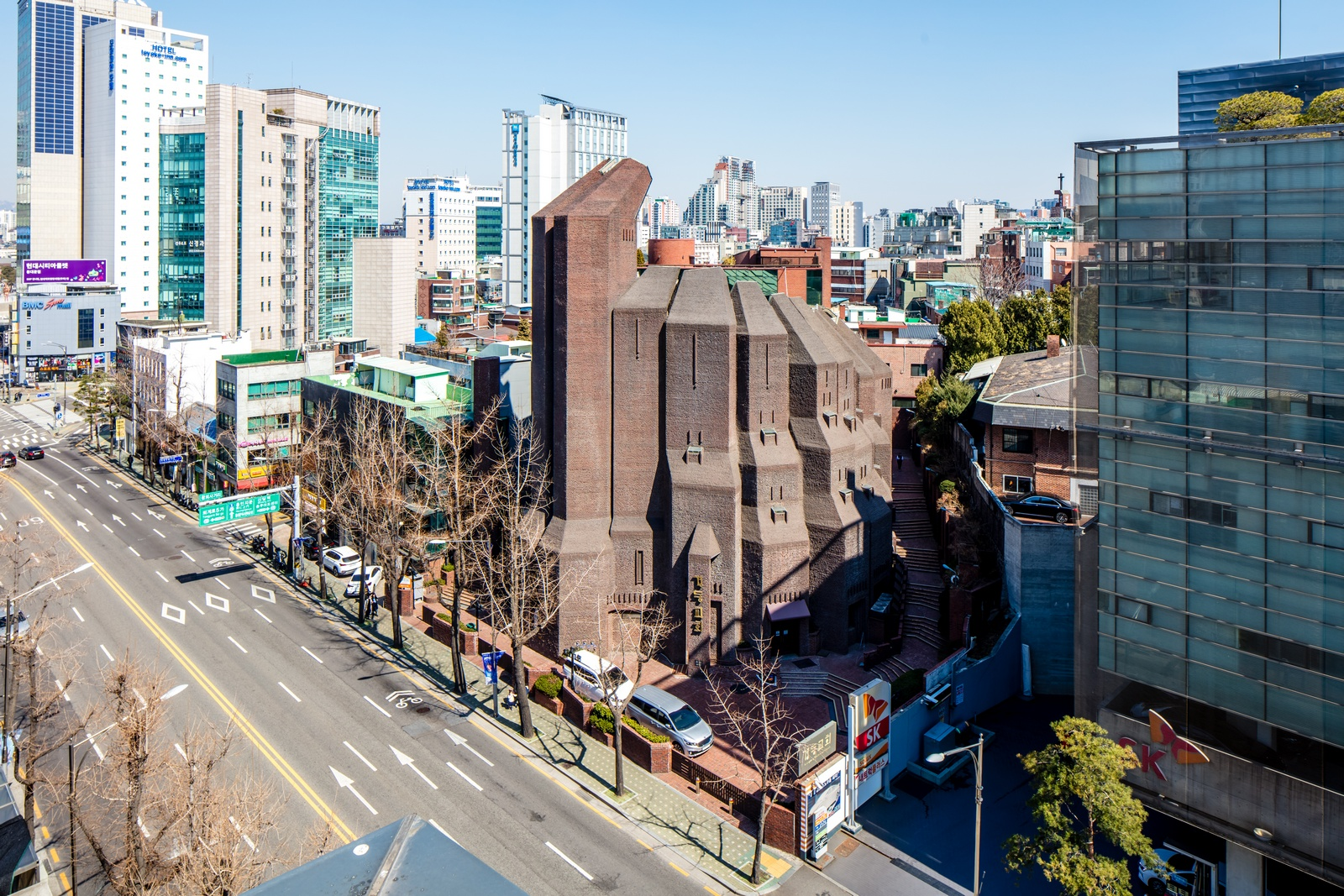
Kyungdong Presbyterian Church

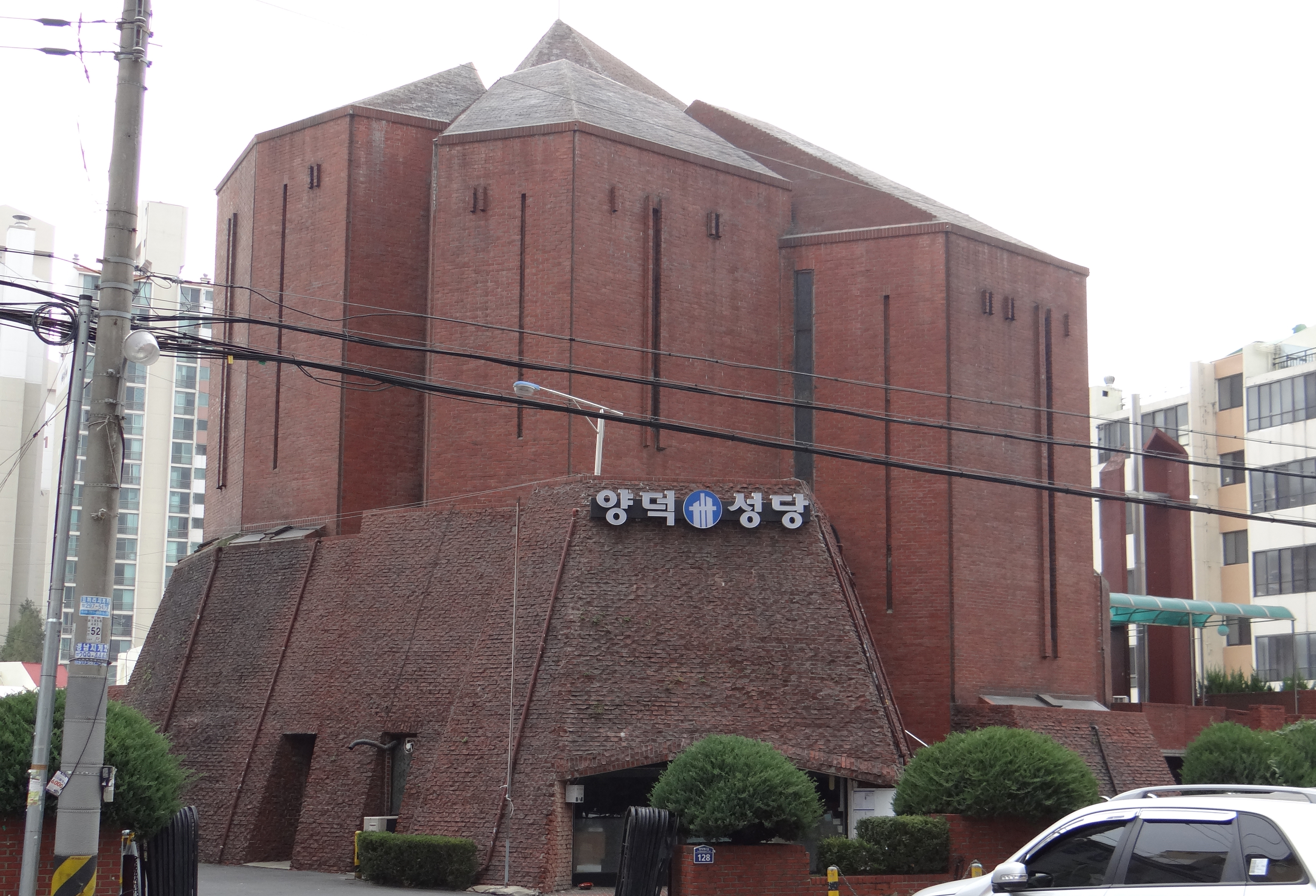
Yangduk Cathedral of the Masan Diocese

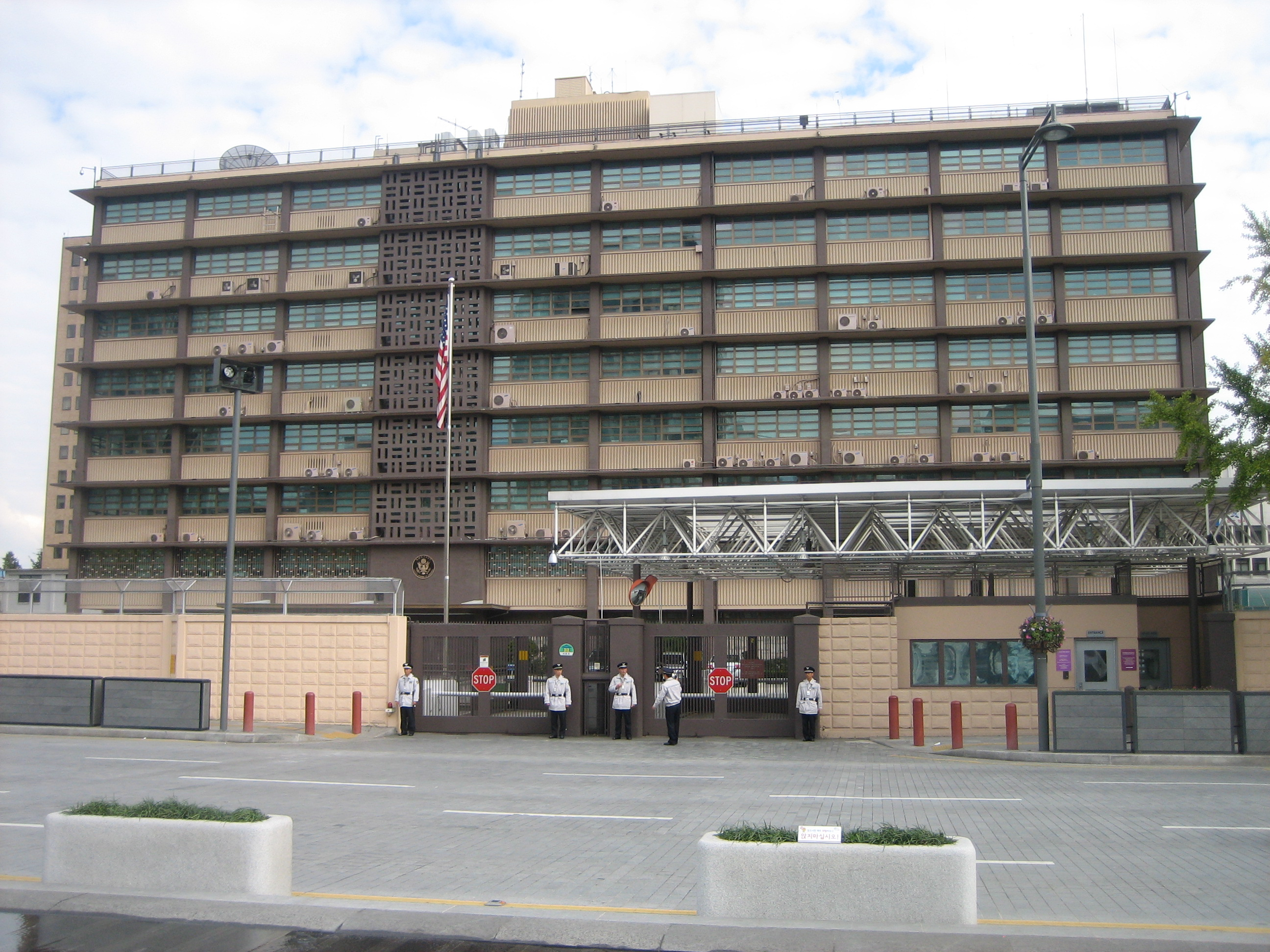
USA Embassy Building in Seoul

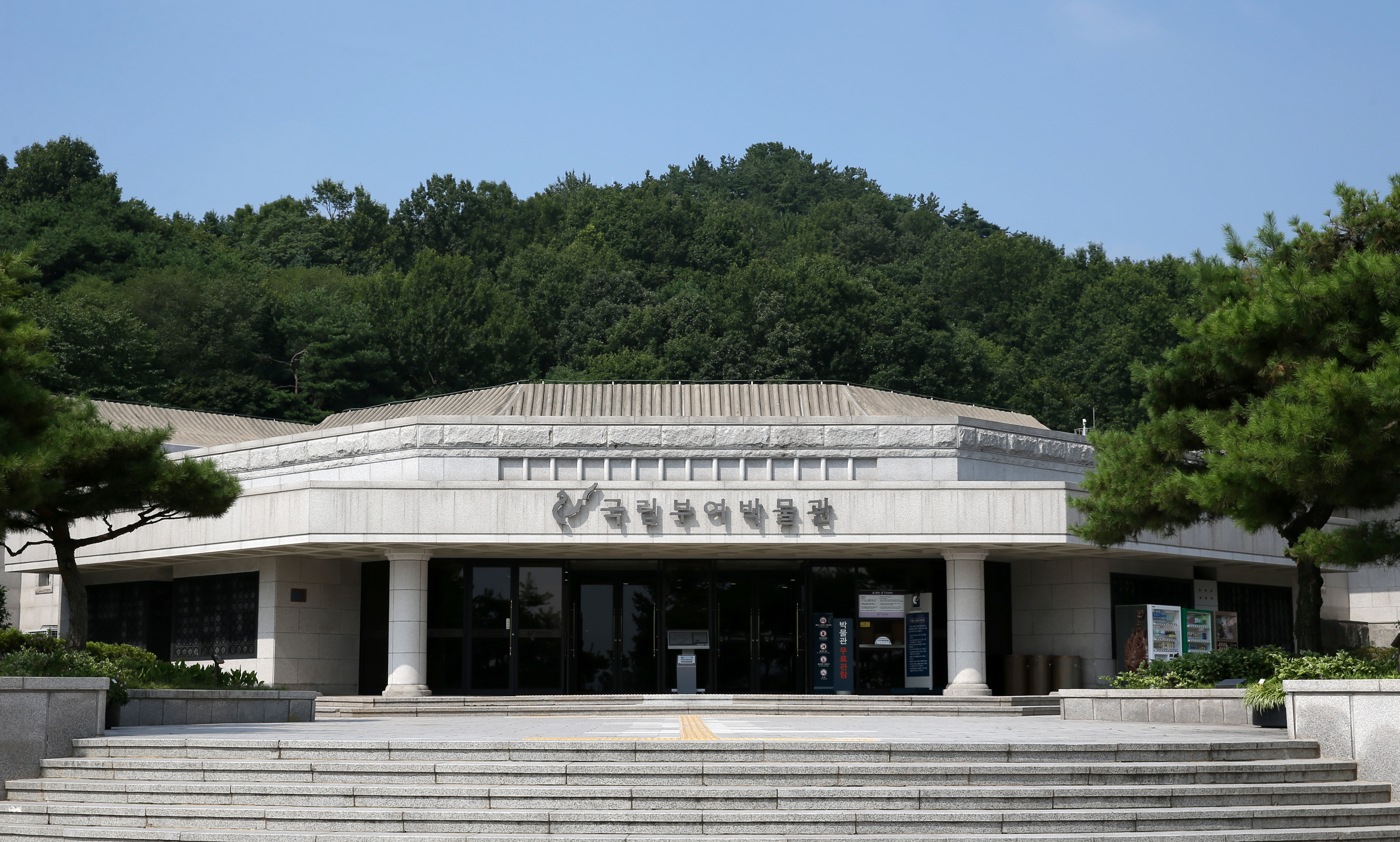
Buyeo National Museum

== Honors ==
- 1970 Civil Merit Medal, South Korea (국민포장 國民褒章)
- 1971 Pan Pacific Citation from the American Institute of Architects (AIA)
- 1979 Commendatore dell' Ordine della Stella della Solidariet' Italiana
- 1982 Honorary Fellow from the American Institute of Architects (AIA)
- 1984 Iron Tower, Order of Industrial Service Merit, South Korea (철탑산업훈장 鐵塔産業勳章)
- 1986 Silver Tower, Order of Industrial Service Merit, South Korea (은탑산업훈장 銀塔産業勳章)

== See also ==
- Architecture of South Korea
