= Cheongju National Museum =

National museum in South Korea

Coordinates: 36.6493°N 127.5122°E

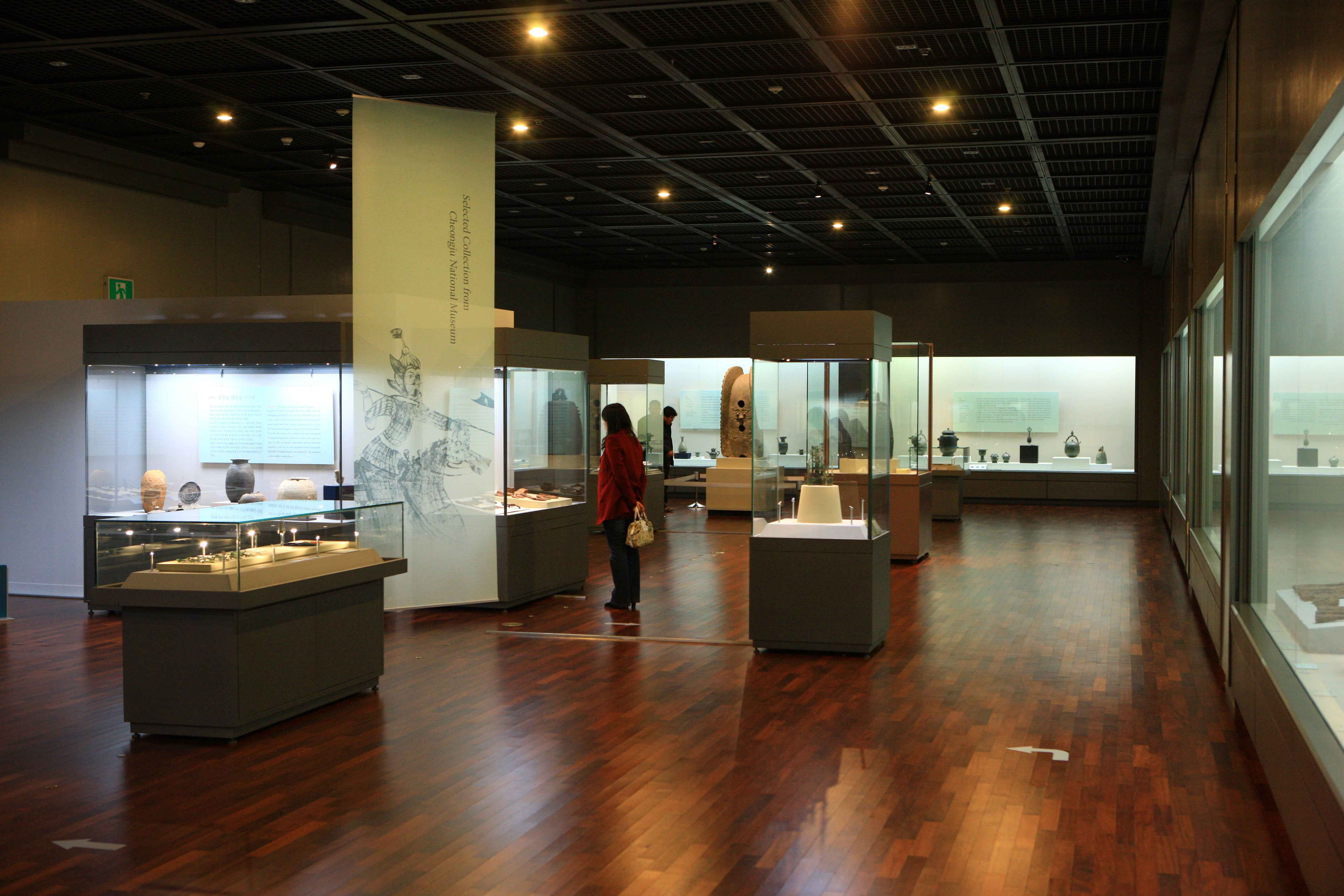

Korean name
- Hangul: 국립청주박물관
- Hanja: 國立淸州博物館
- RR: Gungnip Cheongju bangmulgwan
- MR: Kungnip Ch'ŏngju pangmulgwan

Cheongju National Museum (Korean: 국립청주박물관) is a national museum located in Sangdang-gu, Cheongju, Chungcheongbuk-do, South Korea. It opened on October 30, 1987. Kim Swoo Geun, Korea's most renowned architect designed the building.

== See also ==
- List of museums in South Korea
