= Architecture of South Korea =

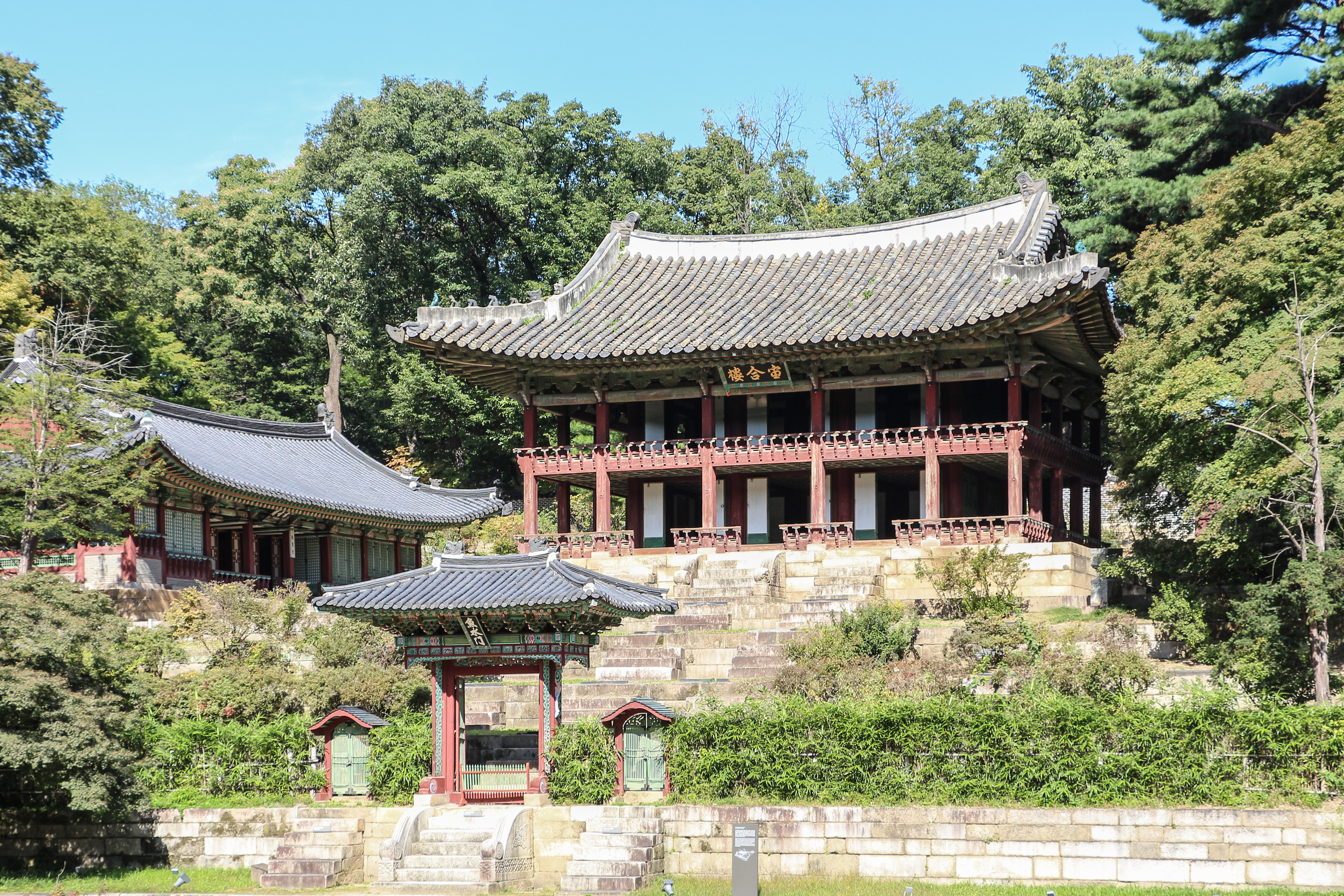
Changdeokgung.

South Korean architecture refers to any architecture in South Korea, which includes architecture from Neolithic–7th century (B.C.E.), three-kingdoms of Korea, Goryeo, Joseon, Japanese occupation, Korean War, and modern architecture.

== Historic architecture ==
Located in Seoul is the Gwangtonggwan, the oldest continuously-operating bank building in Korea. It was registered as one of city's protected monuments on March 5, 2001.

Joseon Architecture

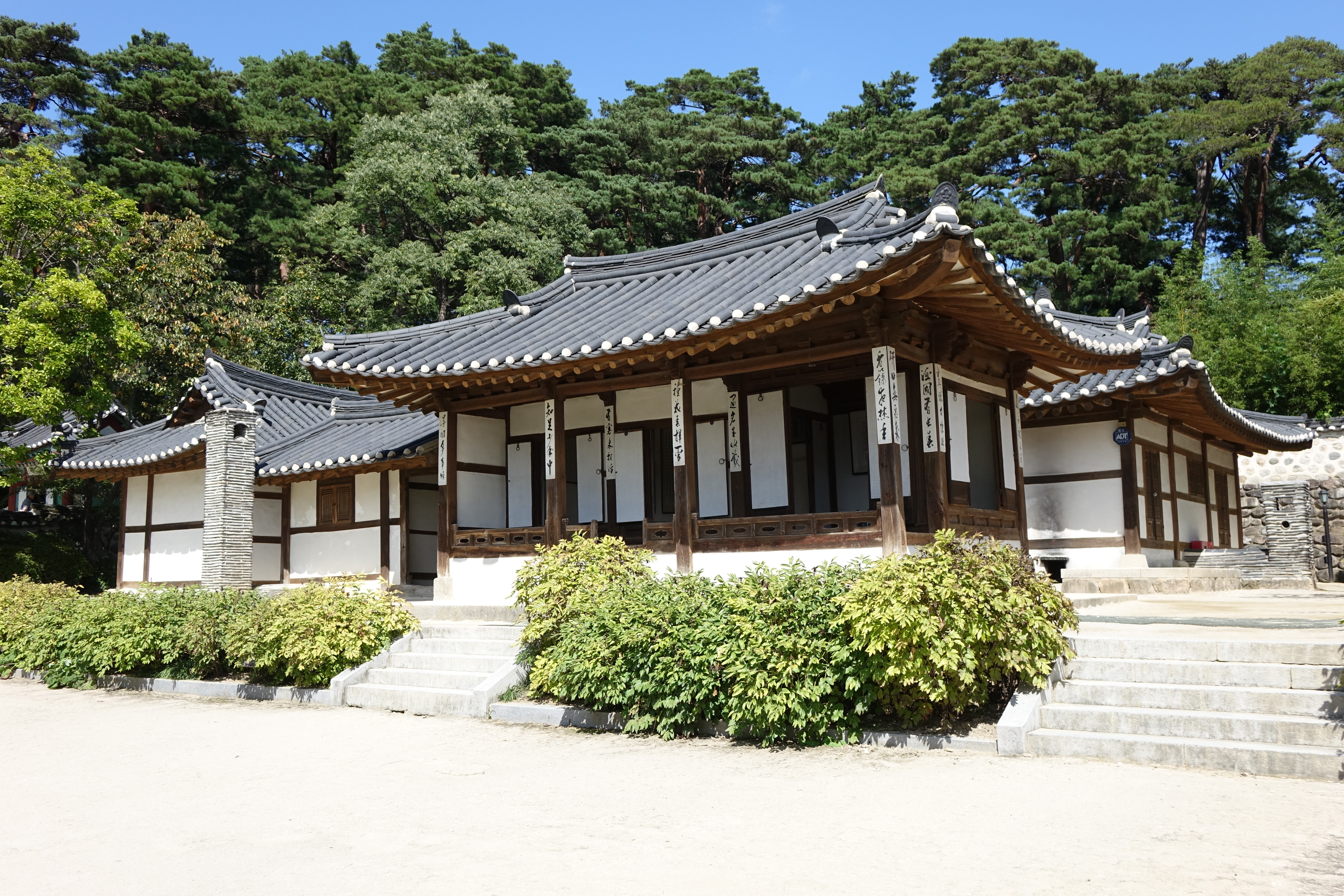
A typical yangban house in Gangneung

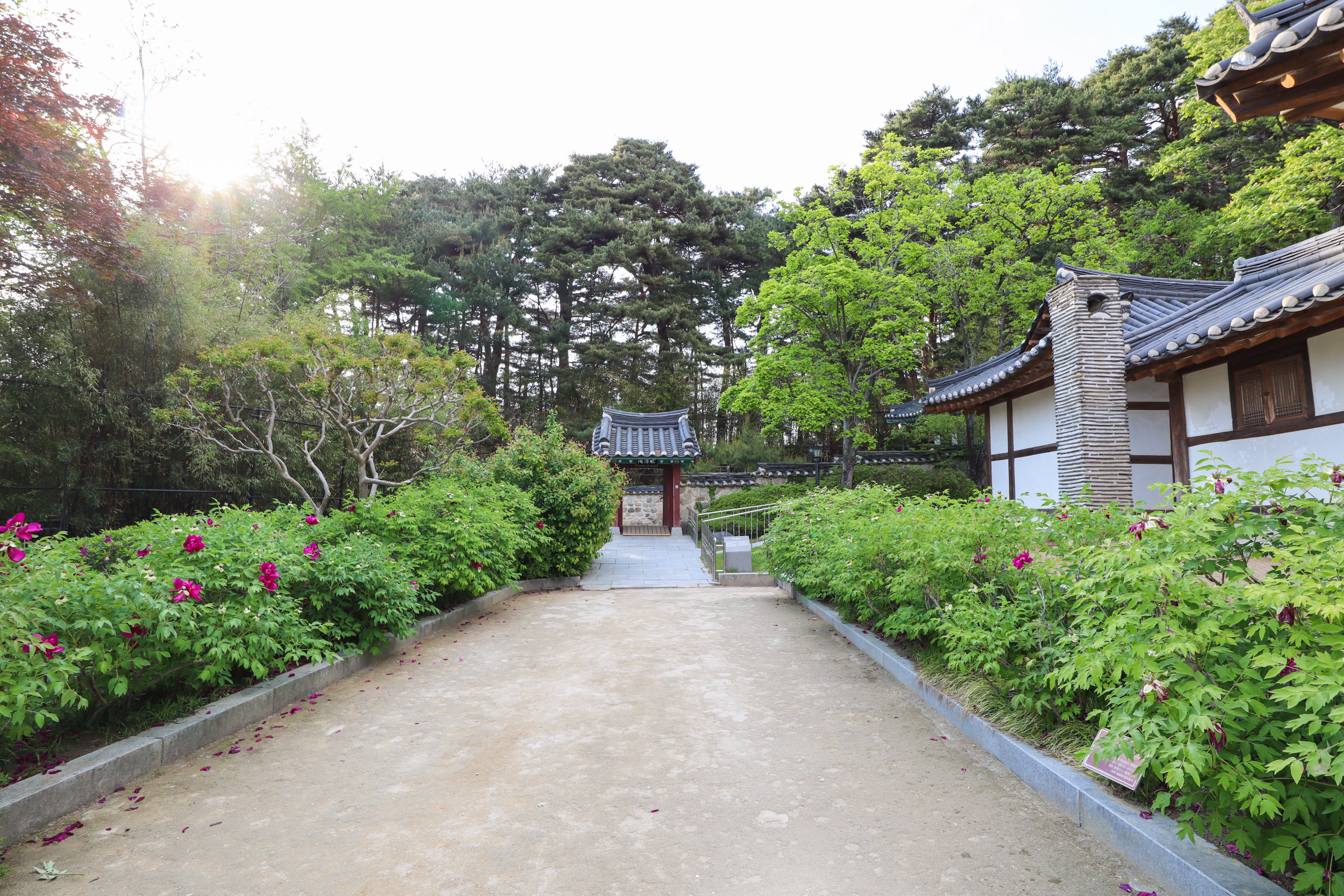
Trees and flowers were carefully arranged to make a nice view.

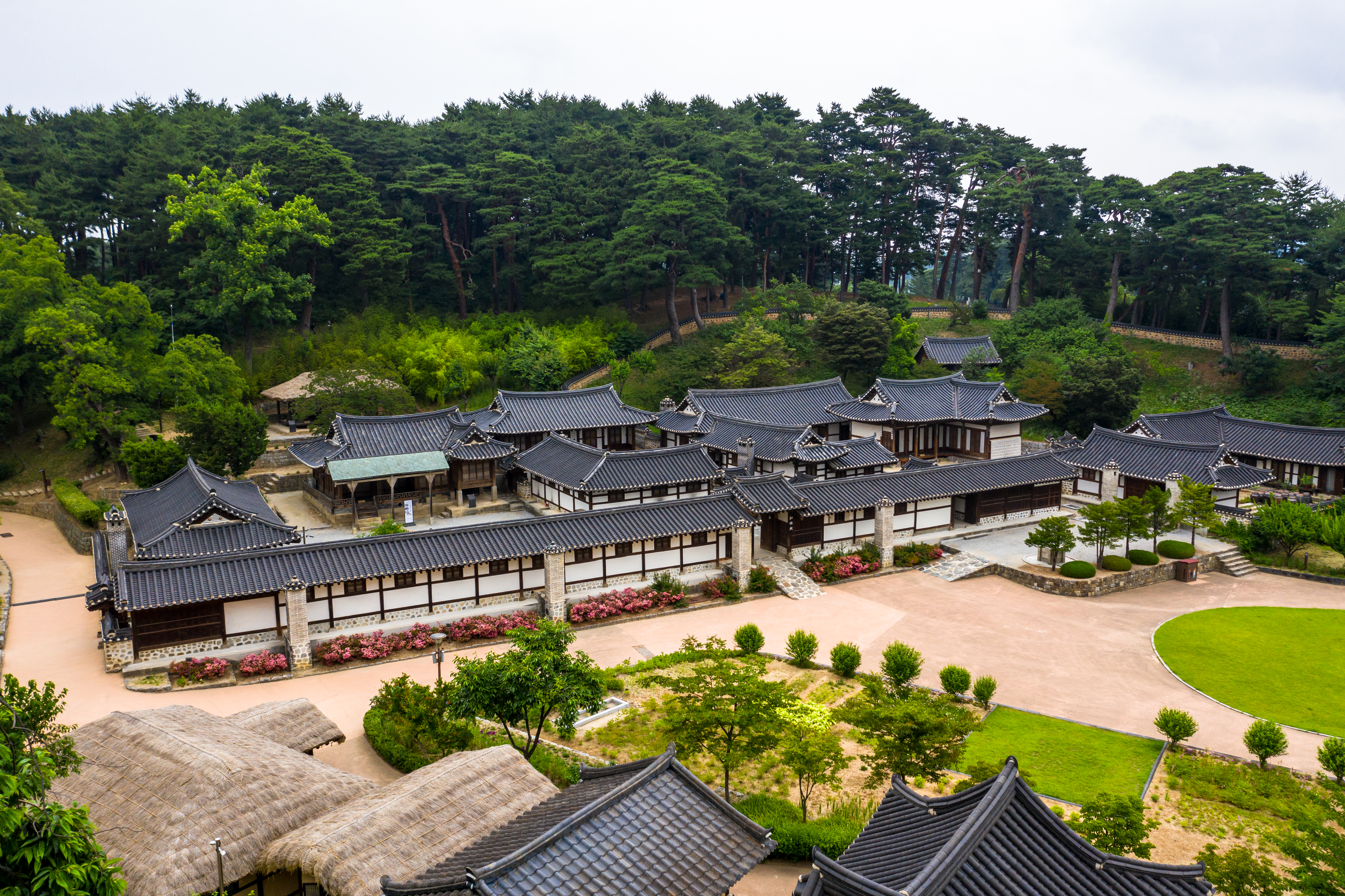
Seongyojang, a grandiose country house for a prominent yangban family in Gangneung

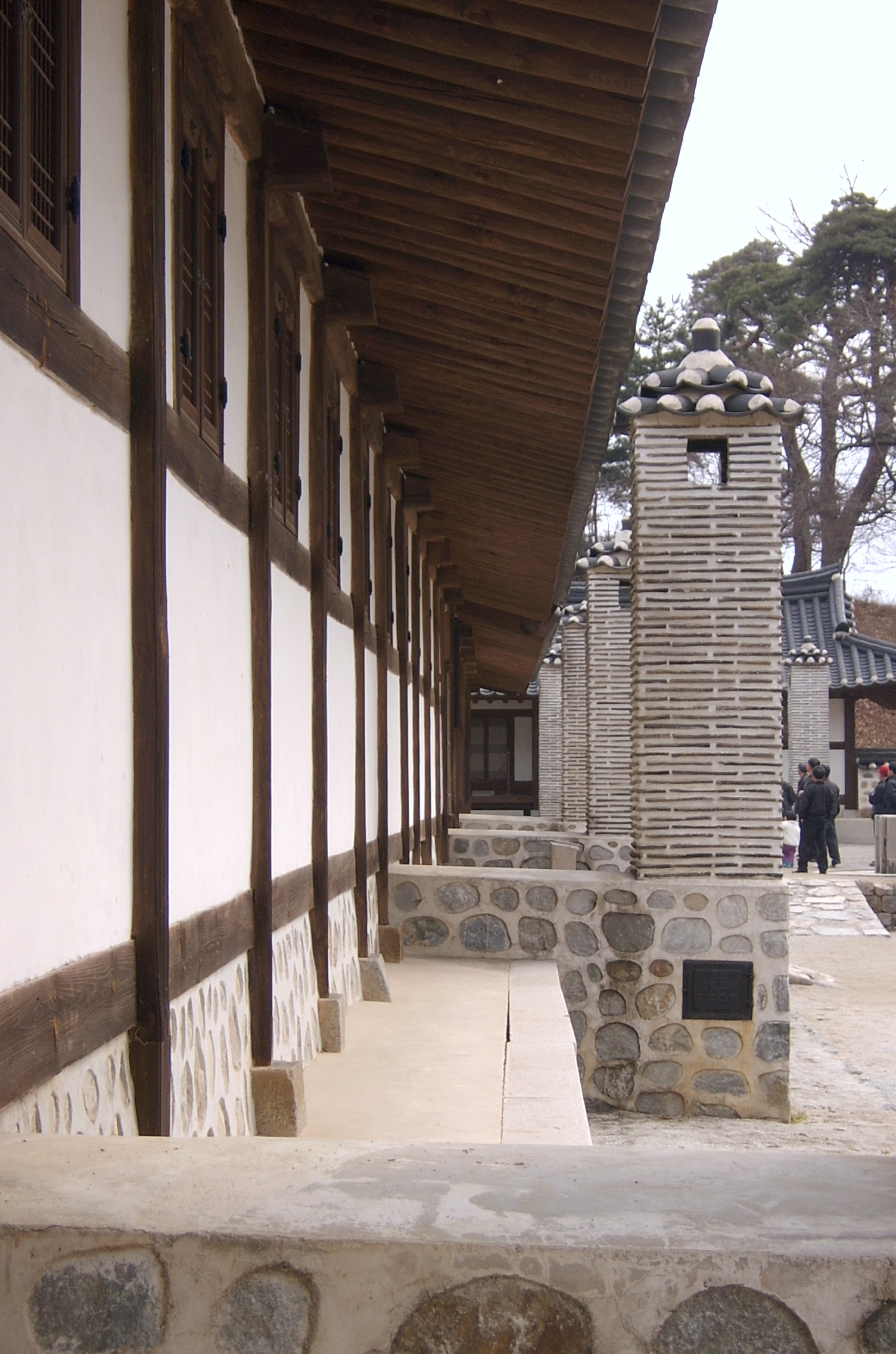
The presence of gulttuk or chimney is a unique characteristic of Korean architecture which is rarely found in its other Asian counterparts.

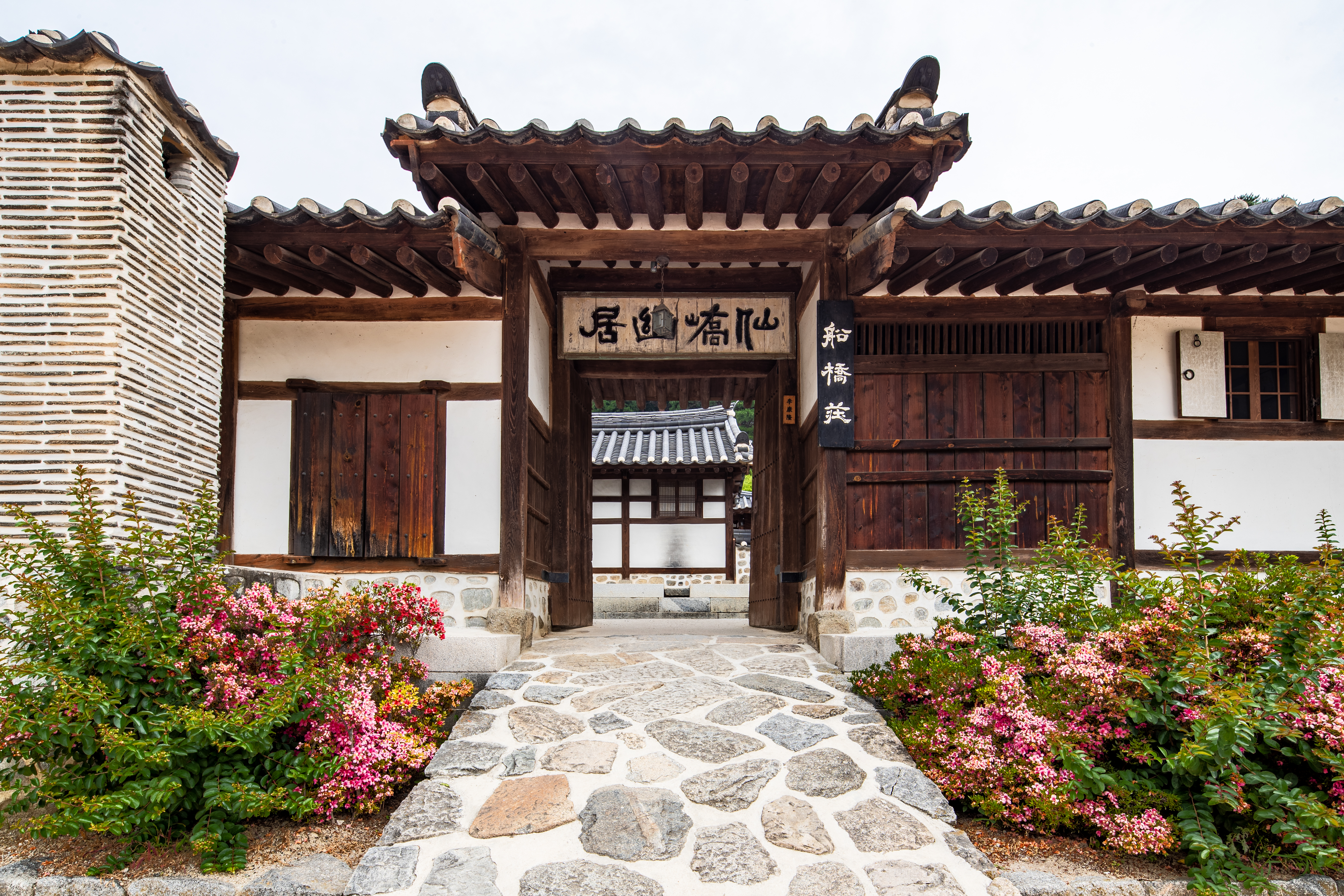
Entrance to house

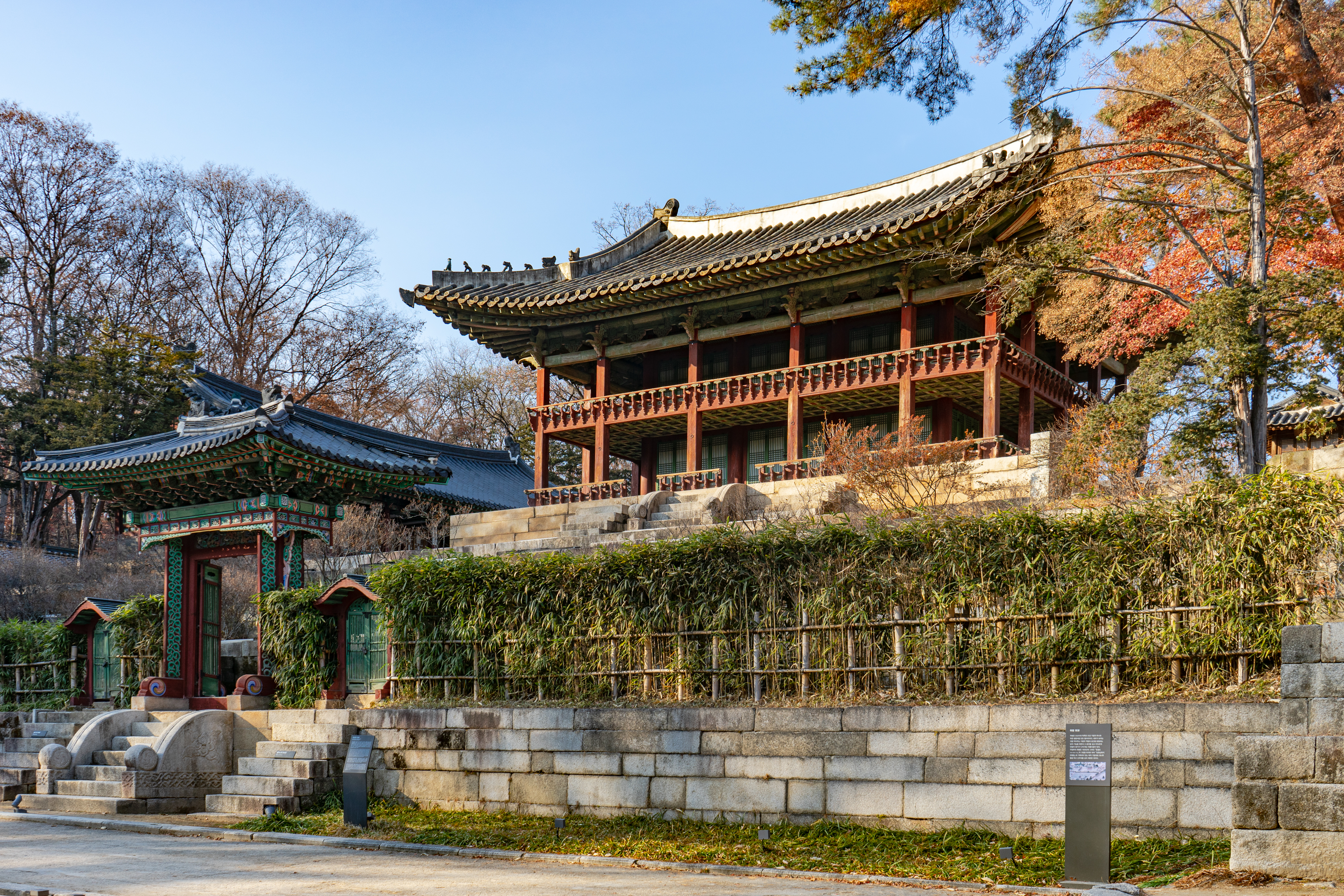
Changdeokgung or Changdeok Royal Palace

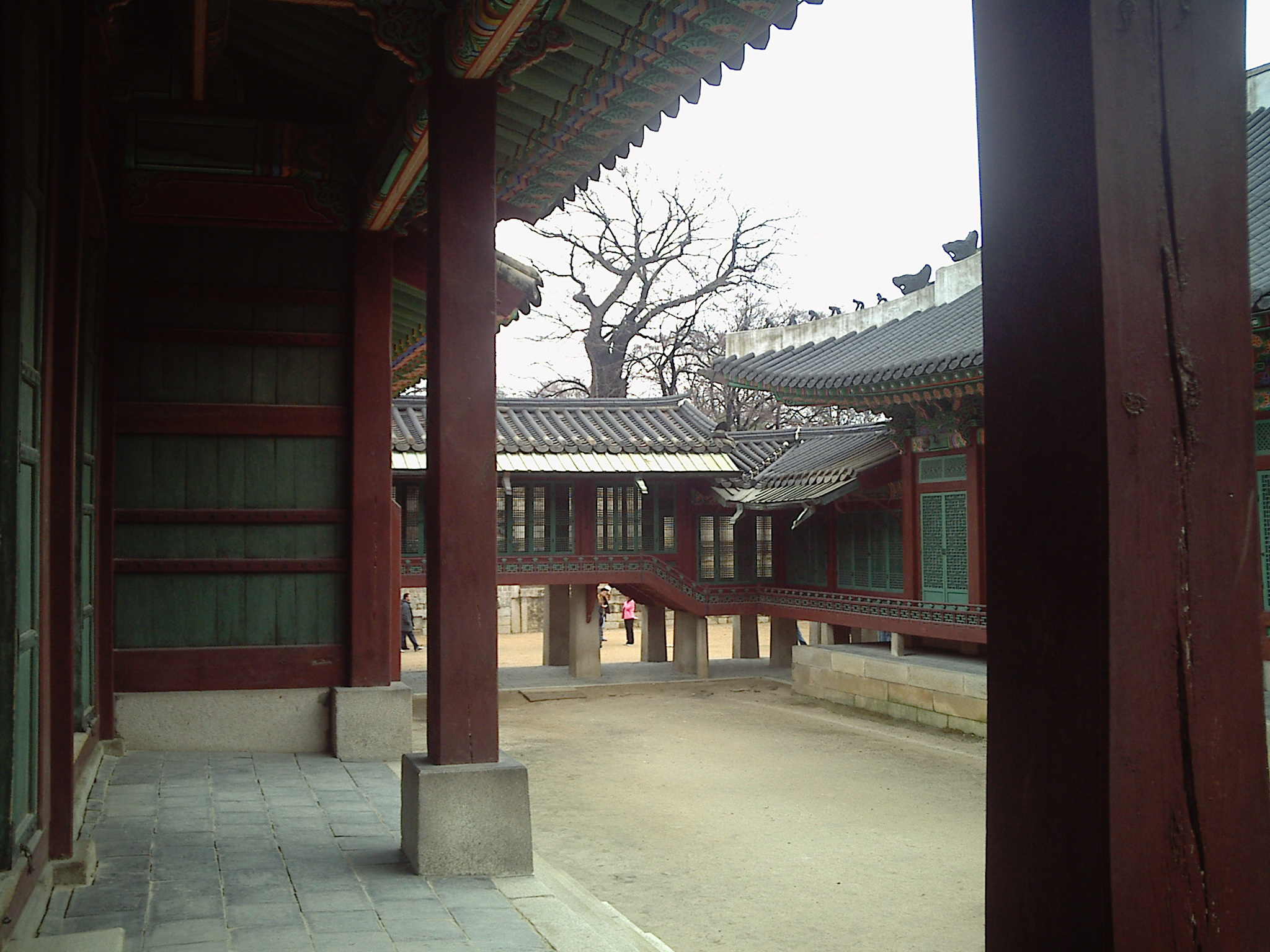
Another pavilion in Changdeok Royal Palace.

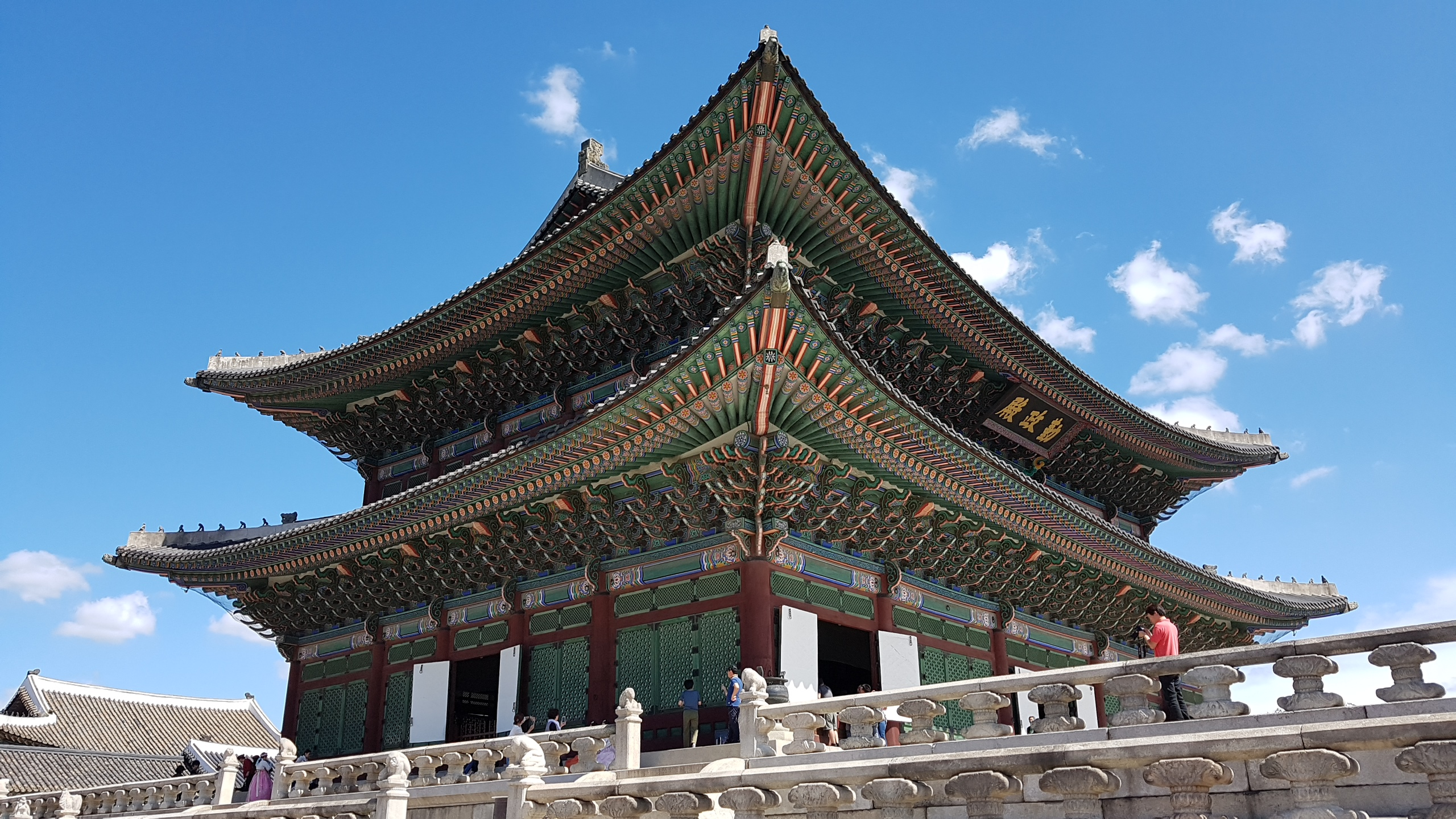
Gyeongbokgung or Gyeongbok Royal Palace

== Post-division architecture ==
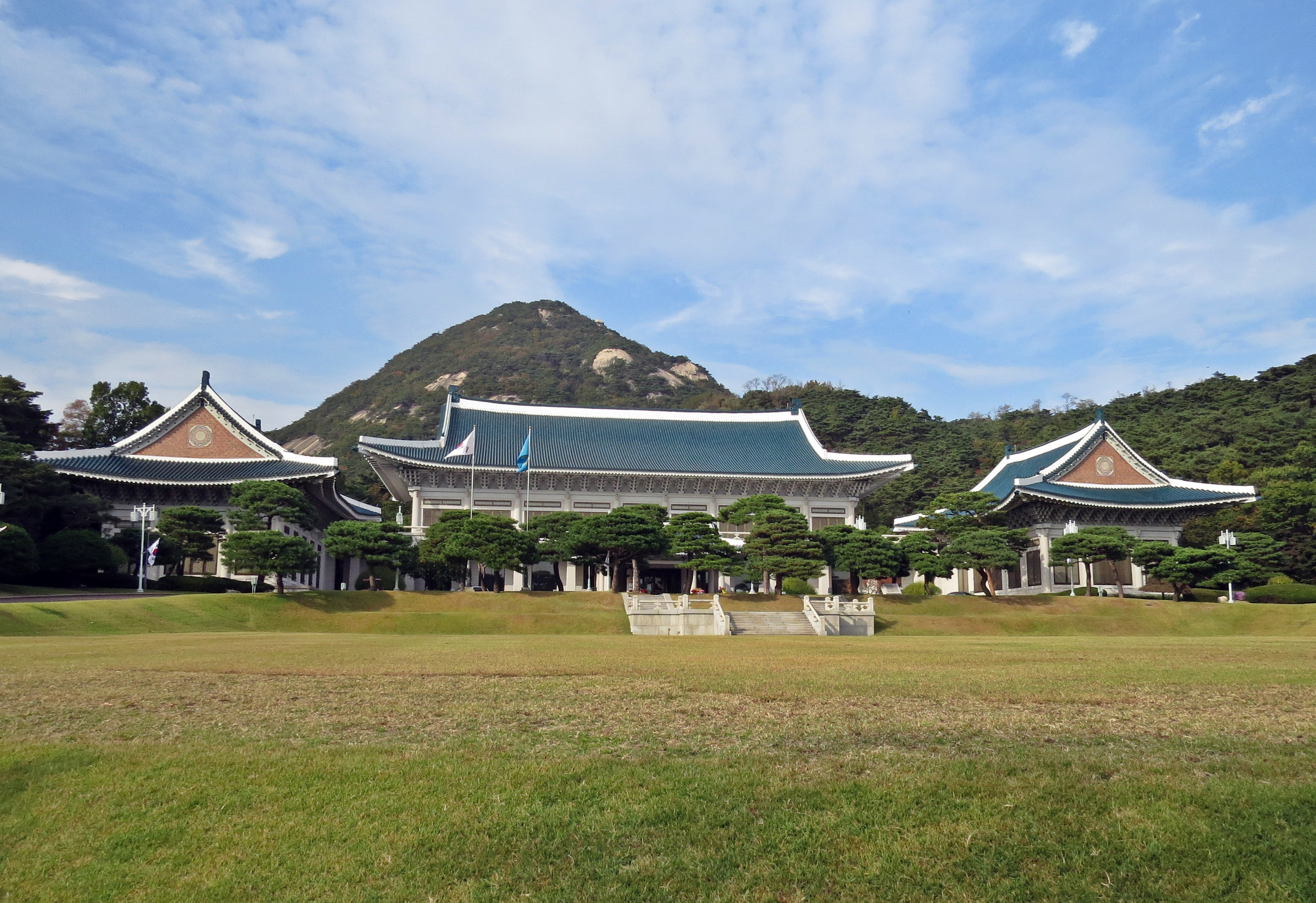
Blue House

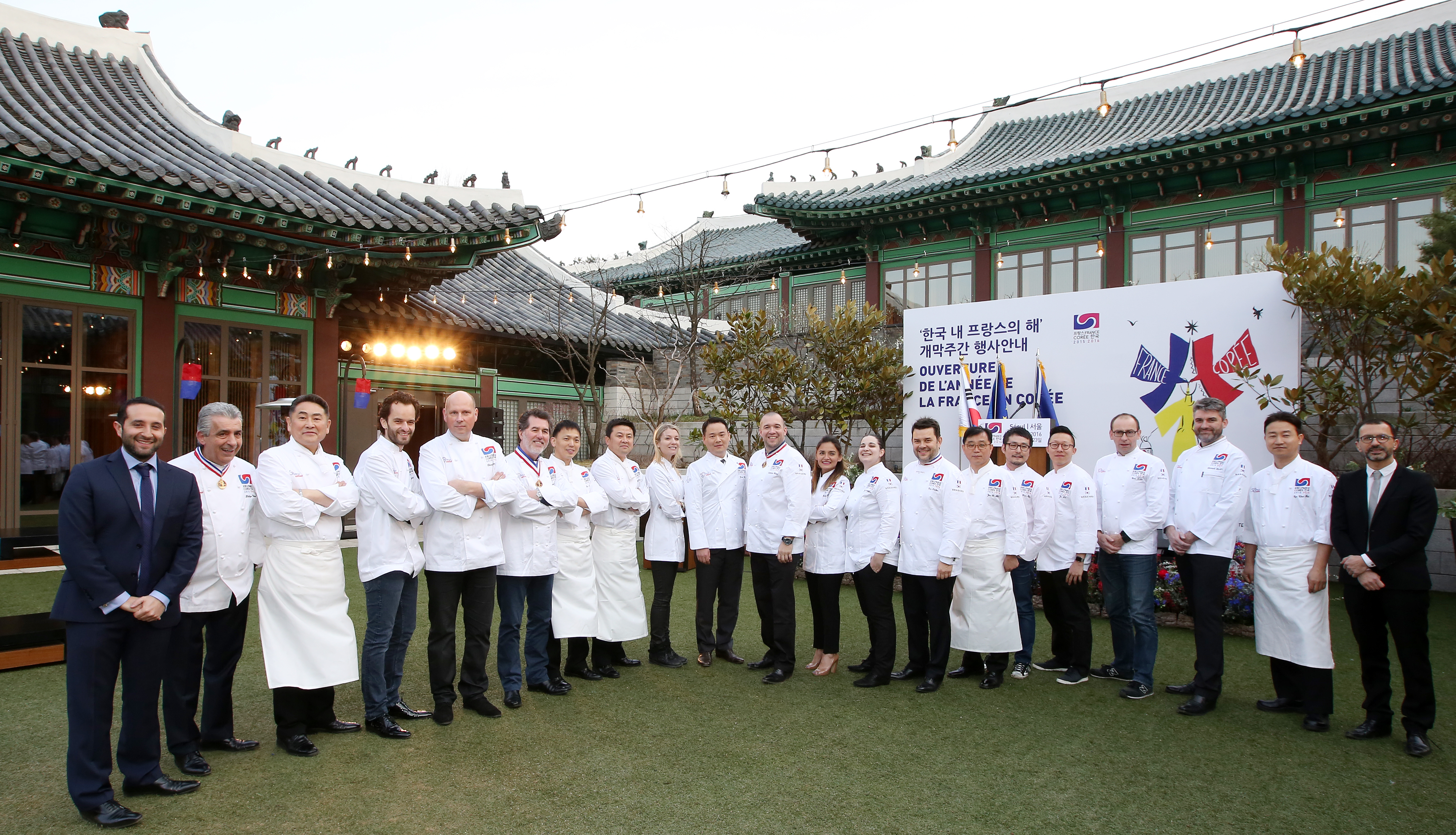
Yeong Bin Gwan of the Shilla Hotel

American models heavily influenced new Korean buildings of any importance, with domestic architecture both civil and rural keeping to traditional buildings, building techniques, and using local materials, and local vernacular styles. The pragmatic need to rebuild a country devastated by exploitative colonization, then a civil war, led to ad hoc buildings with no particular styles, extended repeatedly, and a factory system of simple cheap expendable buildings. As few Korean cities had a grid-system, and were often given limits by mountains, few if any urban landscapes had a sense of distinction; by the mid-1950s, rural areas were underfunded, urban areas overfilled, and urban sprawl began with little money to build distinctive important buildings.

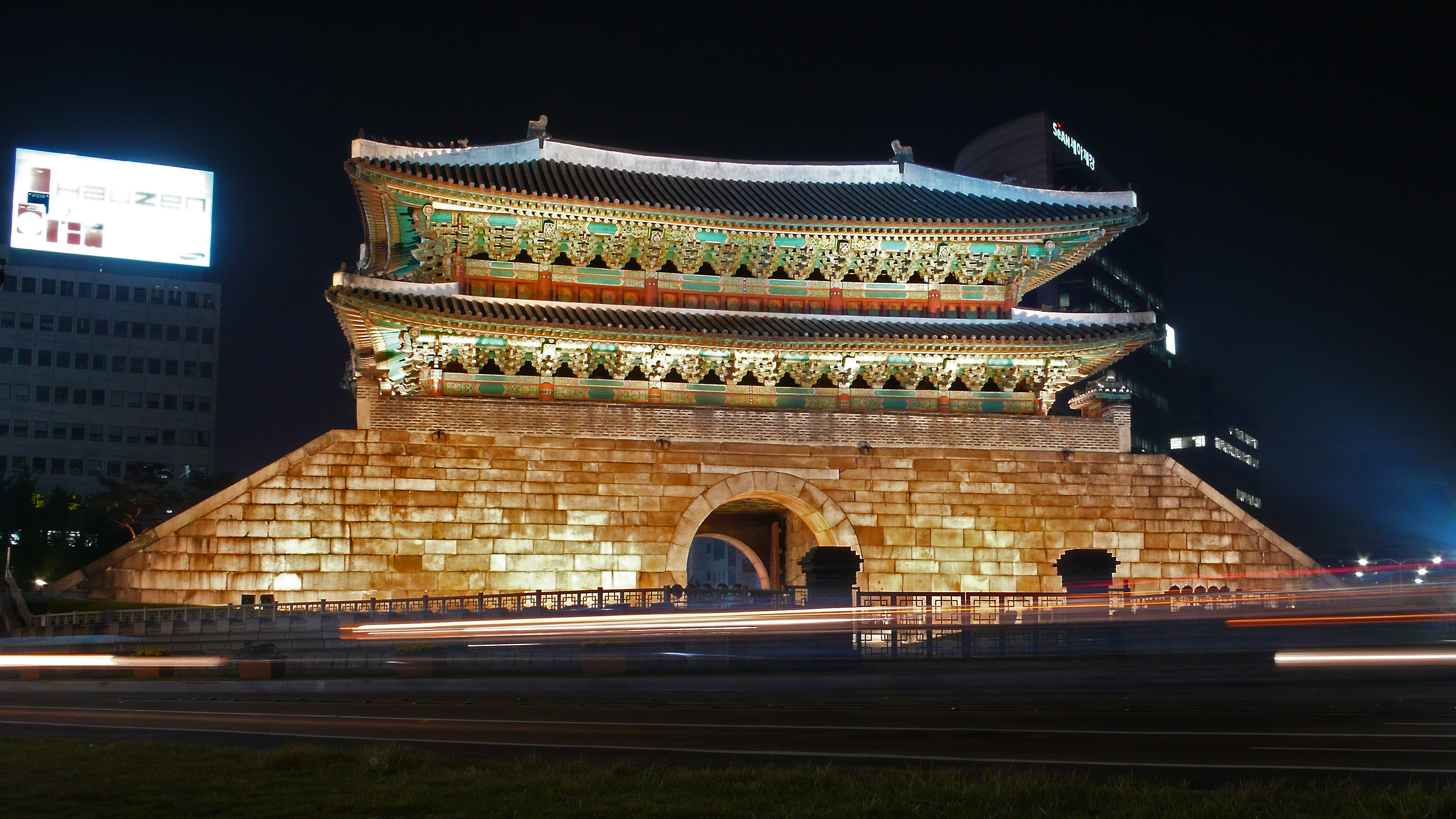
Namdaemun gate at night in Seoul

Buildings were built as quickly as money and demand would allow in a workman-like anonymous way, but without individual identities. Architects were almost to a man trained in the United States, and brought American design, perspective, and methods without much recourse to the local community look and feel. As the need for housing for workers increased, traditional hanok villages were razed, hundreds of simple cheap apartments were put up very fast, and bedroom communities on the periphery of the urban centres grew, built and financed as company housing. Little effort was made to have a sense of an architectural aesthetic.

This urgency for simple fast housing left most Korean downtowns faceless, consisting of rows and rows of bland concrete towers for work or living and local neighborhoods rebuilt with cheap materials. Little or no attempt was made for planning, if planning had been possible. In the countryside, traditional building continued.

Well into the 1980s, Korea had architecture, but its buildings had little aesthetic, a limited sense of design, and did not integrate into the neighbourhoods or culture. Awareness that functionality had reached its limits came quickly as Korea moved into the world through sports culture. Sports architecture transited to a Korean style.

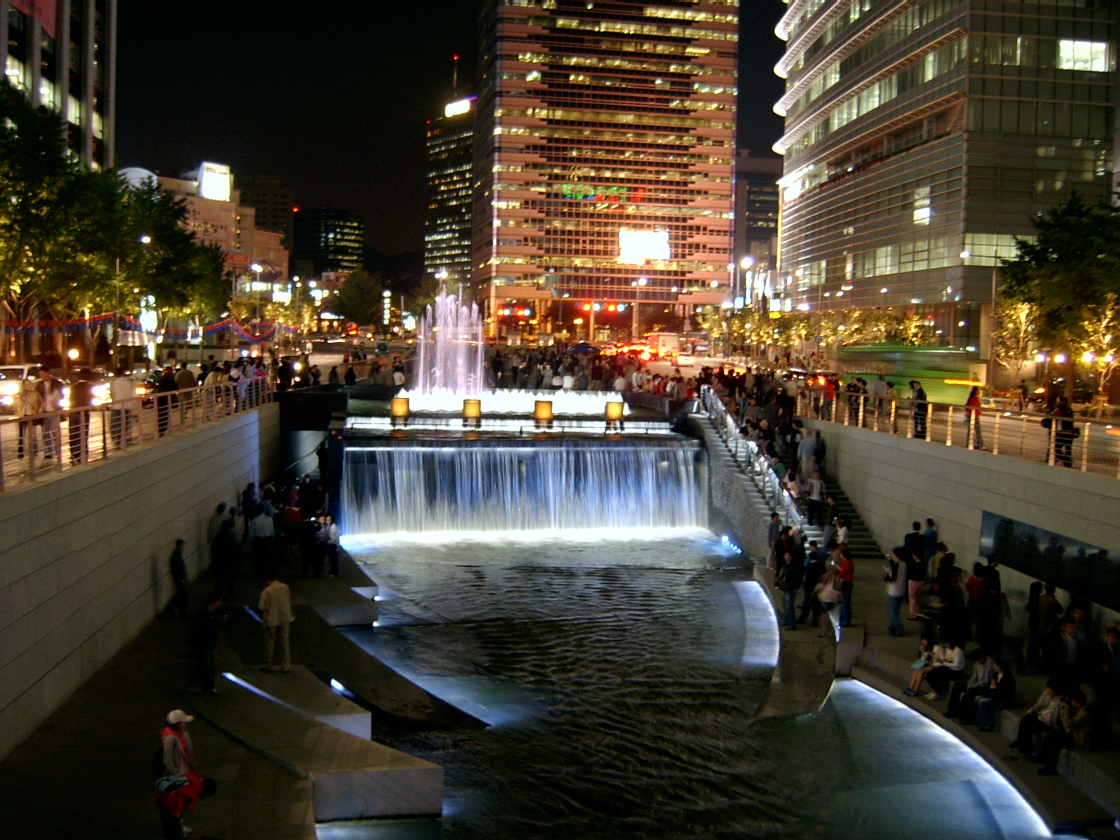
Cheonggyecheon stream at night in downtown Seoul

Seoul tower

== Sports architecture ==
South Korea won the 1986 Asian Games and the 1988 Olympic games, which spurred waves of new building activity. To market the country globally, international architects were encouraged to submit designs, introducing alternative concepts for modern architecture that began to put style and form ahead of spartan practicality. Historically, sports architecture has occupied the most money and the greatest expression of form identity within Korea. Hundreds of billions of won have been spent on defining Korea as a sports mecca with the architecture leading the way.

As in the North, most of the largest projects in the South were government sponsored works: but instead worked in confined, rather than open spaces, and worked with huge amounts of enclosed space, primarily in the state subsidized hugely expensive sports architecture. Korea since the 1980s had its most famous architectural works driven by sports: the Asian Games (1986), the Olympics (1988), and the 2002 World Cup stadia, as well as great support being given by the chaebols such as the Samsung Group which itself owned the sports teams for marketing purposes.

Important architects at this time and their works often led by the atelier-style architectural co-operative Space Group of Korea were:

- Park Kil-ryong
- Jungup Kim or Kim Chung-up - Trained in France and designed the Olympic Memorial Gate/World Peace Gate, 1988.
- Jongseong Kim - Weight Lifting Gymnasium, Olympic Park, 1986.
- Kim Su-keun who trained in Tokyo - Olympic Stadium. 1984. Total area is 133,649 m^{2}, 100,000 seats, 245×180 m diameter, 830 m perimeter.
- Gyusung Woo - Olympic Village, 1984.

It wasn't until the late 1980s and early 1990s that an entirely new generation of Korean architects had the freedom and the financing to build Korean architecture in a distinct Korean manner. This was a result of architects studying and training in Europe, Canada, and even in South America, and seeing the need for more of a sense of unique style, and more sophisticated materials.

There was a new determination that nationalistic architectural elements had to be revived and refined. Buildings had to mean something within their cultural context.

== Technology infrastructure ==
Naro Space Center is the country's spaceport. It is built on 4.95 million square meters of reclaimed land in Goheung County, South Jeolla. Scheduled to be completed by the end of 2007 or early 2008, the first launch from the spaceport was in August 2009.

== Future architecture ==
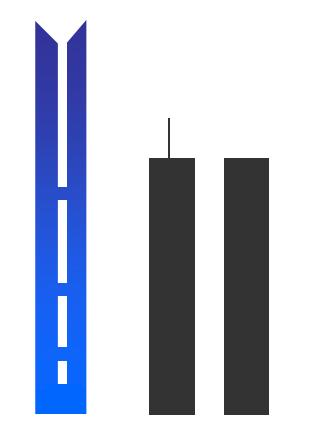
102 Incheon Tower compared to the World Trade Center's twin towers

A number of supertall structures are planned for South Korea:

- The 102 Incheon Tower is a twin tower skyscraper, the main feature of a 13,000 acres (5,300 ha) urban development referred as New Songdo City, located in Incheon. Construction on the $3 billion, 613 m (2,011 ft) project began in 2013. A financial recession caused it to be canceled in 2016.
- The Busan Lotte Town Tower is a planned 108-floor, 510.1 m (1,674 ft) skyscraper, part of an extensive riverfront development in Busan. It was planned to be completed in 2019, but construction was halted in 2013 due to funding issues.
