= 102 Incheon Tower =

151 Incheon Tower
- Proposed Rendition of the Incheon Tower
- Interactive map of the 151 Incheon Tower area

General information
- Status: Under construction
- Type: Mixed-use
- Location: Songdo International City, Incheon, South Korea
- Groundbreaking: June 20, 2008
- Construction started: 2025
- Completed: 2030
- Cost: 17 trillion won US$11 billion

Height
- Antenna spire: 487 m (1,598 ft)

Technical details
- Floor count: 102
- Floor area: 506,538 m^{2} (5,452,330 sq ft)

Design and construction
- Architect: John C. Portman Jr.
- Developer: Hyundai Engineering and Construction
- Engineer: Thornton Tomasetti

The 151 Incheon Tower was a supertall twin tower proposed for construction in Songdo International City, Incheon, South Korea. The design consisted of two 151 floor, 613 m (2,011 ft) supertall skyscrapers connected by three skybridges. The building would have become the tallest twin towers in the world, surpassing the Petronas Towers in Kuala Lumpur, Malaysia, and one of the tallest buildings in Asia. After the late-2000s recession, the tower was postponed with the possibility of a redesign at a lower height. The height of the tower was reduced from 613 metres to 487 metres while keeping the design the same.

The Skyscraper was designed to represent Songdo City. It would have included offices, residential space, and a hotel. It would have been a Korean landmark upon completion. The complex was due to be located at the US$35 billion New Songdo City, and would have covered over 6 km^{2} (2.3 sq mi) of land, about 32 km (20 mi) from the nation's capital, Seoul. Developer Portman Holdings, run by John Portman, signed an agreement with South Korean officials to build the tower. Construction started with groundbreaking on 20 June 2008. Construction halted in 2009. Construction resumed in 2013, but the project was cancelled in 2016.

== Floor plans ==
The following is a breakdown of floors of the original 151 story design:

Floors	Use	Area (square metres)
151	Observatory	11,042
149-151	Restaurant	13,194
115-148	Hotel	86,702
97-114	Boutique Hotel	169,951
55-96	Residences	71,124
7-54	Office	102,736
B1-6	Retail/Shopping Mall	506,538
