= Min Hyun-sik =

South Korean architect (born 1946)

Min Hyun-sik 민현식
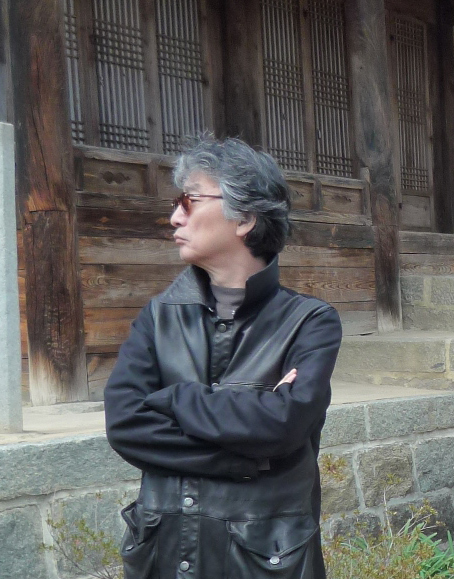
- Born: October 21, 1946 (age 80); South Gyeongsang, Korea
- Occupation: Architect
- Awards: Special Prize Aumdukmun, Honorable Mention for International Architecture Competition for the National Museum of Korea, etc.
- Practice: KIOHUN
- Buildings: Korean National University of Cultural Heritage, Qingdao Complex of Sindohrico Company, Daejeon University Comprehensive Campus Plan

Min Hyun-sik (born 21 October 1946) is a South Korean architect.

== Biography ==
Min was born in 1946, in Gyeongnam, Korea. After having worked and studied under architect Kim Swoo Geun of Space Group and architect Yoon Seung Joong of Wondoshi Architects Group (of which he had been a partner since 1980), he studied at the Architectural Association School of Architecture in London, UK, in 1989/1990. In 1992, he started his own practice H. Min Architect and Associates. In 1997, he was one of the core members to establish a school of visual arts at the Korea National University of Arts, at which he holds a professorship to this day.

His active communication with the public first became recognized with "Housing with Deep Space", exhibited in the 1992 show "Echoes of an Era". Since then he has continually presented new projects, each one of them containing creative issues, for example, "Phenomenological Aesthetics", "Madang; Specific indeterminate space", "Architectural Landscape", "Structuring Emptiness; ethics over aesthetics".

Extending his architectural interests into urbanism, he participated in several urban planning and design projects, for example, "Paju Landscape Script" for Paju Book City, and the schematic design of "Gwangju, the Capital City of Asian Culture". His works and ideas have always been the center of debate and controversy, and have marked important turning points in Korean architecture and urbanism.

Most of all, his works have centered on "Structuring Emptiness", which stems from Korean traditional architecture. Min's propositions in architecture are continually concerned with "Structuring Emptiness" which is a design of potentials: as infrastructures of daily lives deeply related to the properties and intimacies of the site it sit on. This idea aims to reach beyond the level of objectification in architecture. Abstracting the geological features of the site, he creates a specific architectural landscape. Alternative to symbolic architecture, this idea presents a way to search for different dimensions of architecture and reach beyond the level of objectification. His works are not only searching for the identity of Korean contemporary architecture but also developing and expanding those ideas to generate a theory of the future.

Presented by works, publications, articles, teaching, and international exhibitions, including Venice Biennale 1996/2000/2002, "Structuring Emptiness" invited by University of Pennsylvania in 2003, and "Paju Book City" at Aedes West in Berlin, 2005, his creative ideas shows us the possibility of acquiring universality in the realm of architecture.

== Profile ==
- 2006 Honorary Fellowship FAIA (Hon. FAIA) Fellow of the American Institute of Architects
- 2002 ~ 2004 Dean of Faculty of Visual Art in Korea National University of Arts,
- 1997 ~ Prof. Department of Architecture in Korea National University of Arts,
- 1997 ~ Adviser of KIOHUN
- 1996 ~ 1997 Chairman of KIOHUN
- 1992 ~ 1996 Chairman of Architectural Research(Former KIOHUN)
- 1980 ~ 1992 Urban and Architecture Office 'ONE'
- 1974 ~ 1975 Architectural Group ‘JANG’
- 1972 ~ 1974 SPACE Group

== Notable works ==
- Sindohrico Company
  - 2004 ~ 2005 Qingdao Complex
  - 1999 Asan Factory
  - 1999 Head Office and Seoul Factory
  - 1994 Administration Building
  - 1991 Hostel for Sindohrico Workers
- Educational Facilities
  - 2001 ~ 2009 Daejeon University Comprehensive Campus Plan, Munmugwan, Multi-Activity Center, etc.
  - 1999 Moontae High School
  - 1998 Korean National University of Cultural Heritage (homepage)
  - 1998 National Conservatory of Korea Traditional Music
- Office Building
  - 2005 Head Office & Exhibition Gallery of R-TOTO Company
  - 2004 Hayyim Building, an office complex for venture enterprises
  - 2000 Sanggye Branch Shop of Juno Hair
- Housing
  - 2008 WALDHAUS JISAN
  - 2000 Housing with Deep Space
  - 1999 Unit Plan and Design of Samsung Tower Palace
  - 1995 Bongchun residential district development Apartment
- Religious Building
  - 2005 Dongsoong Presbyterian Church
  - 1997 Sungyak Presbyterian Church
- Hospital
  - 2006 Gimcheon Silver Hospital
  - 1999 Pohang Christianity Hospital
- Paju Book City
  - 2005 Bupmoonsa Publication Company
  - 2004 KD Media Paju Book City
  - 2004 Language and Creation Publication Company
  - 2004 BOOKXEN, Publication Distribution Complex
  - 2004 Paju Landscape Script of Paju Book City
  - 2004 Info-Room of Paju Book City
- ETC
  - 2009 Korea Institute of Science and Technology (Jeonbuk Branch)
  - 2007 Haenam Hwawon resort
  - 2005 Pyung Hoa Nuri Pieace Park + Youth Training center
  - 2005 UNESCO World Heritage Jongmyo
  - 1995 National Museum of Korea Competition
