= Banpo (disambiguation) =

Banpo is an archaeological site in Xi'an, China.

Banpo may also refer to:

- Banpo-dong, a dong, neighbourhood of Seocho-gu in Seoul, South Korea
- Banpo Station, subway station in Jamwon-dong, Seoul, South Korea
- Banpo Bridge, a bridge over the Han River, South Korea
- Banpo symbols, found at Banpo archaeological site

== See also ==
- Bonpo, a member of the Bon religion
