= Zeniel =

Korean human resources company

Zeniel Co, Ltd.
- Company type: Public
- Founded: 1996
- Headquarters: Seocho-gu, Seoul, Korea
- Key people: Bak In Joo, Management & CEO
- Products: List of Incruit services and tools
- Number of employees: 5500 est. (2006)
- Website: http://www.zeniel.co.kr

Zeniel Co, Ltd. (Korean: 제니엘) was one of Korea's first outsourcing companies for corporate services. The company operates a human resources media portal for companies and for jobseekers.

Zeniel is headquartered in Seocho-dong Seocho-gu Seoul, Korea. It began in 1990 and was incorporated in 1996. The company's chairman is Bak In Joo (박인주).

== See also ==
- Contemporary culture of South Korea
