= Jamwon-dong =

Neighborhood in Seoul, South Korea

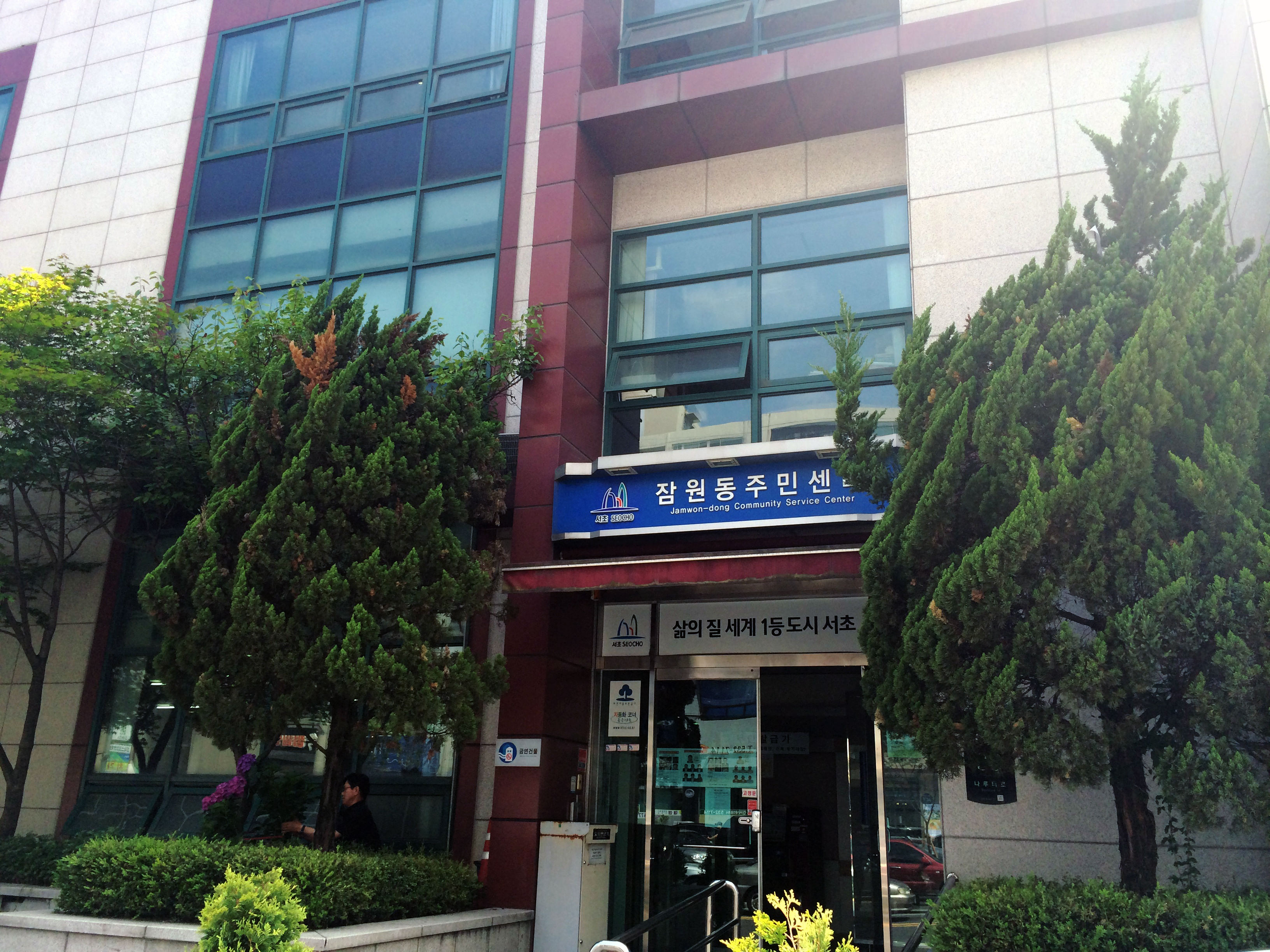
- Jamwon-dong Community Service Center

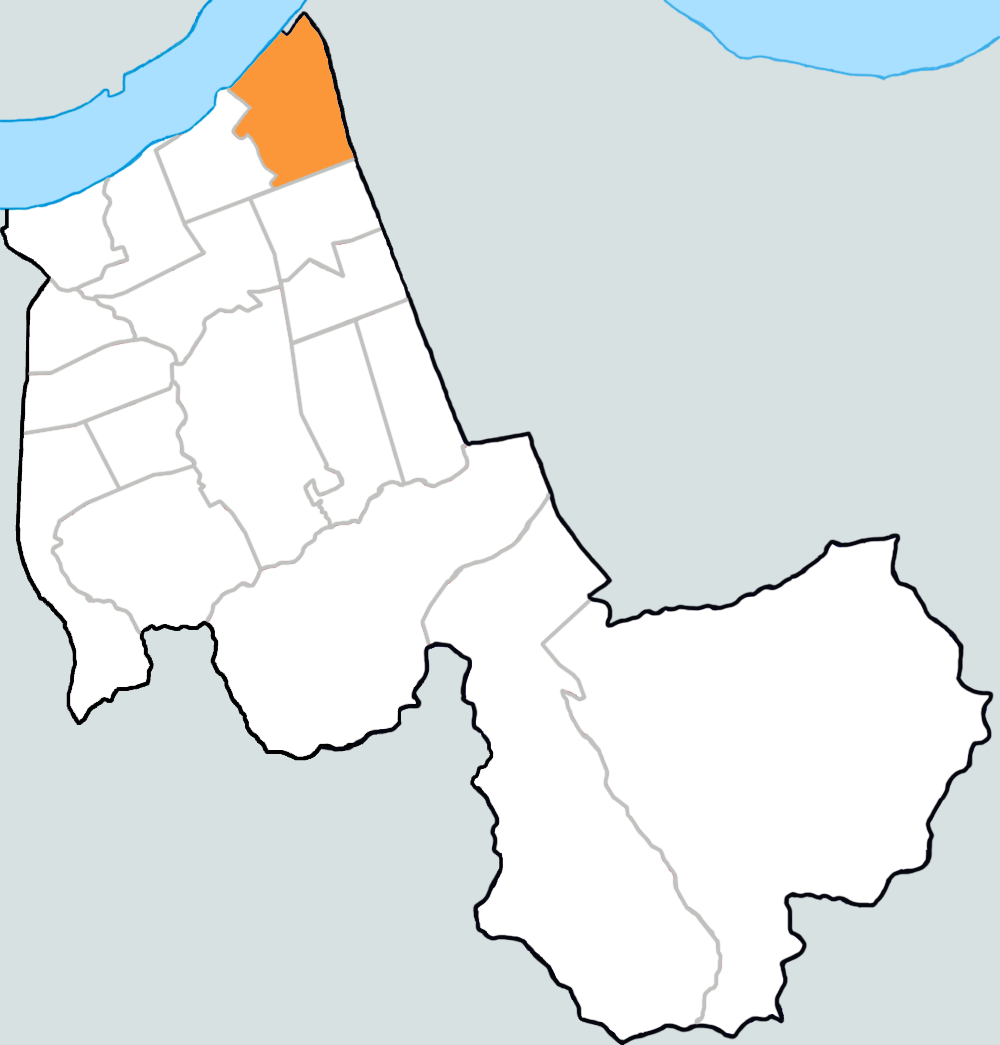
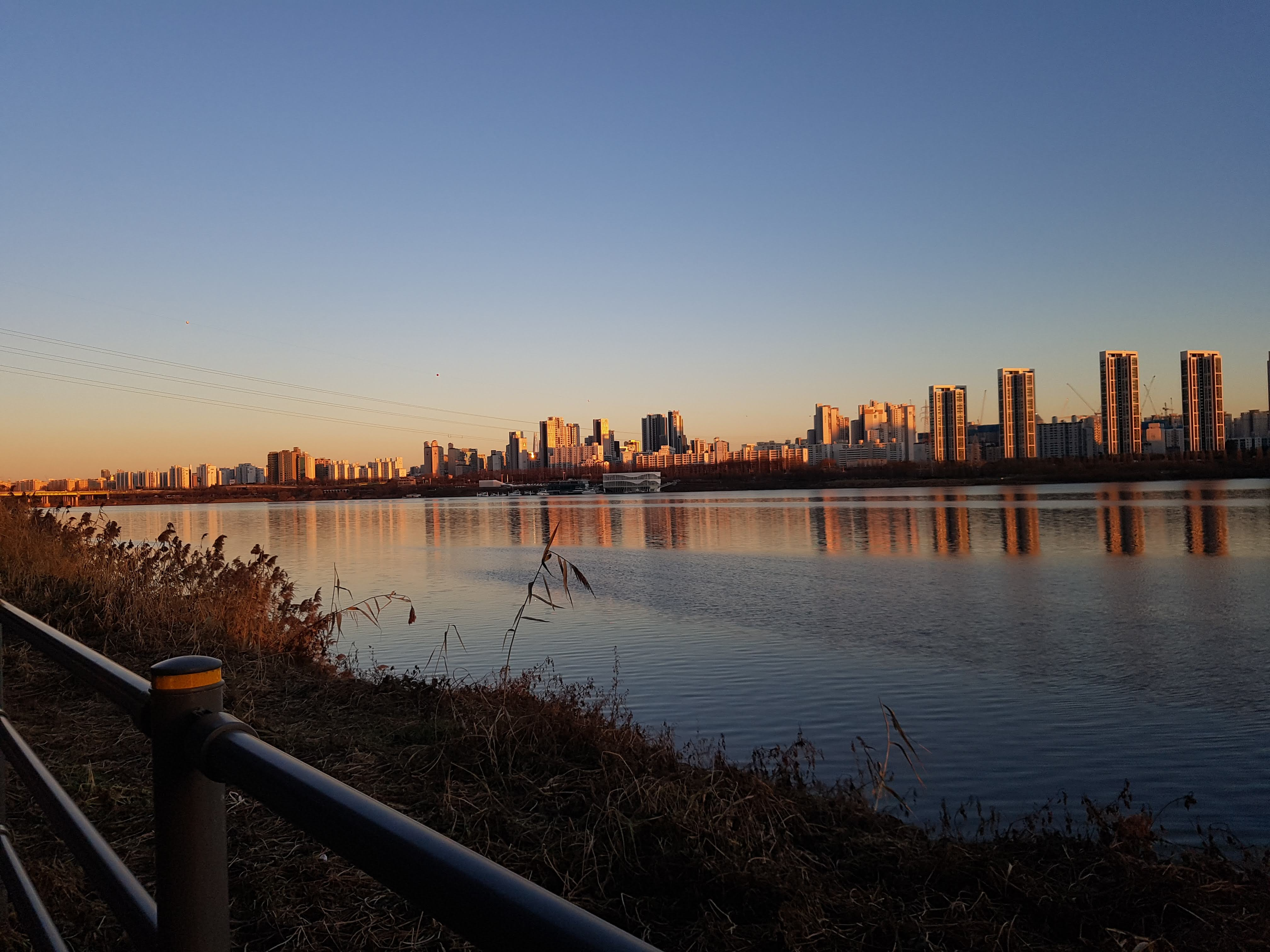
- Jamwon-dong within Seocho District A view of Jamwon-dong from the Han River
- Country: South Korea

Area
  - Total: 3.04 km^{2} (1.17 sq mi)

Population (2023)
  - Total: 49,996
  - Density: 16,400/km^{2} (42,600/sq mi)

Korean name
- Hangul: 잠원동
- Hanja: 蠶院洞
- RR: Jamwon-dong
- MR: Chamwŏn-dong

Jamwon-dong (Korean: 잠원동) is a dong (neighborhood) of Seocho District, Seoul, South Korea. Until 1988, Jamwon-dong was under the jurisdiction of Gangnam District. Jamwon-dong is popular for its mulberry trees and silkworms, whose cocoon is used to make fabric for clothing. As a legal-status neighborhood, Jamwon-dong includes Banpo 3-dong and Jamwon-dong (administrative neighborhood).

== Education ==
High School

- Chungdam High School

Middle Schools

- Gyeongwon Middle School
- Shindong Middle School

Elementary Schools

- Seoul Banwon Elementary School
- Seoul Sindong Elementary School

== Transportation ==
- Jamwon station of
- Sinsa station of
- Banpo station of
- Nonhyeon station of
- Express Bus Terminal station of

== See also ==
- Administrative divisions of South Korea
