= Banpo-dong =

Neighborhood in Seoul, South Korea

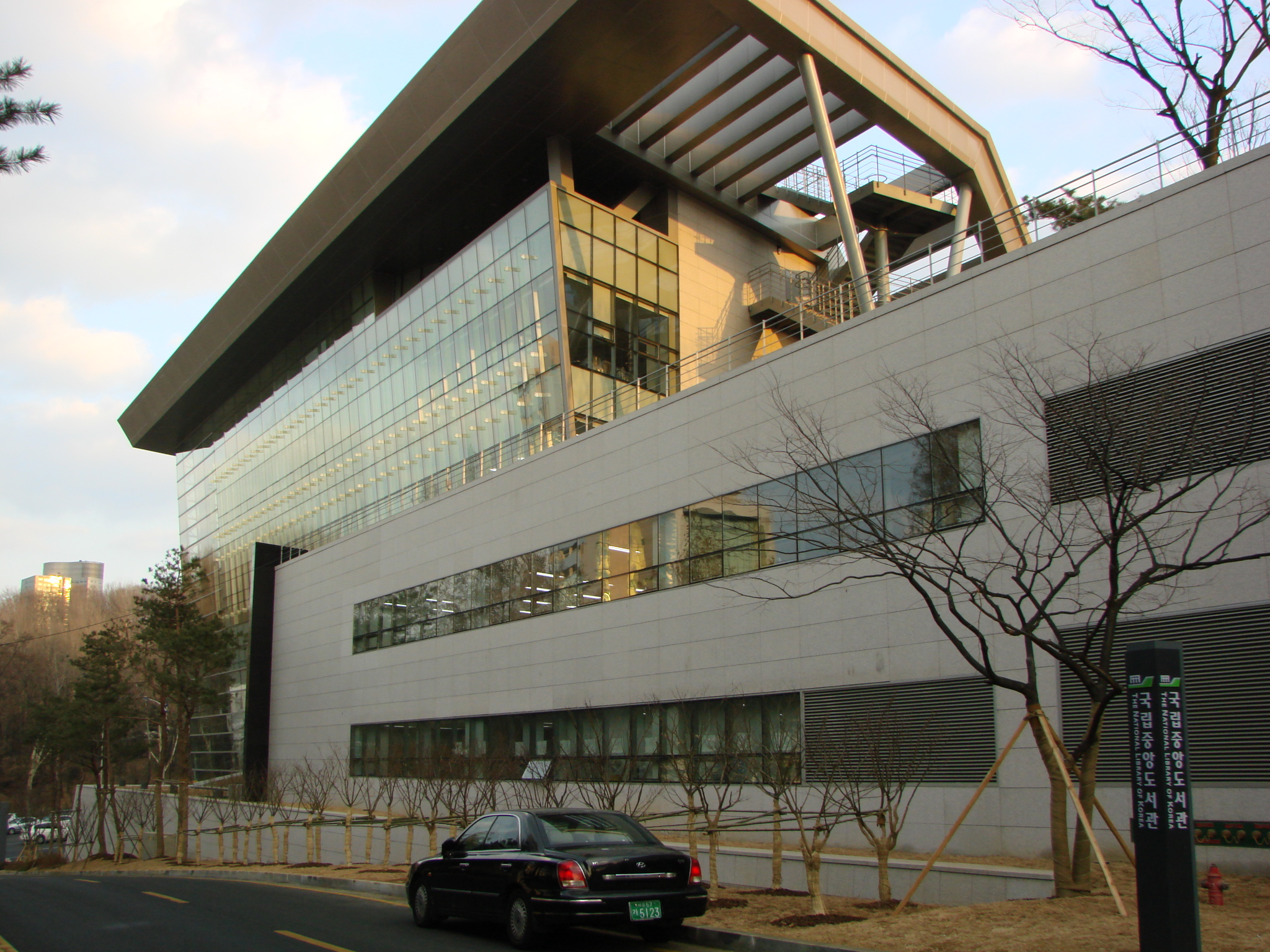
- Exterior of National Library of Korea located in the Banpo district

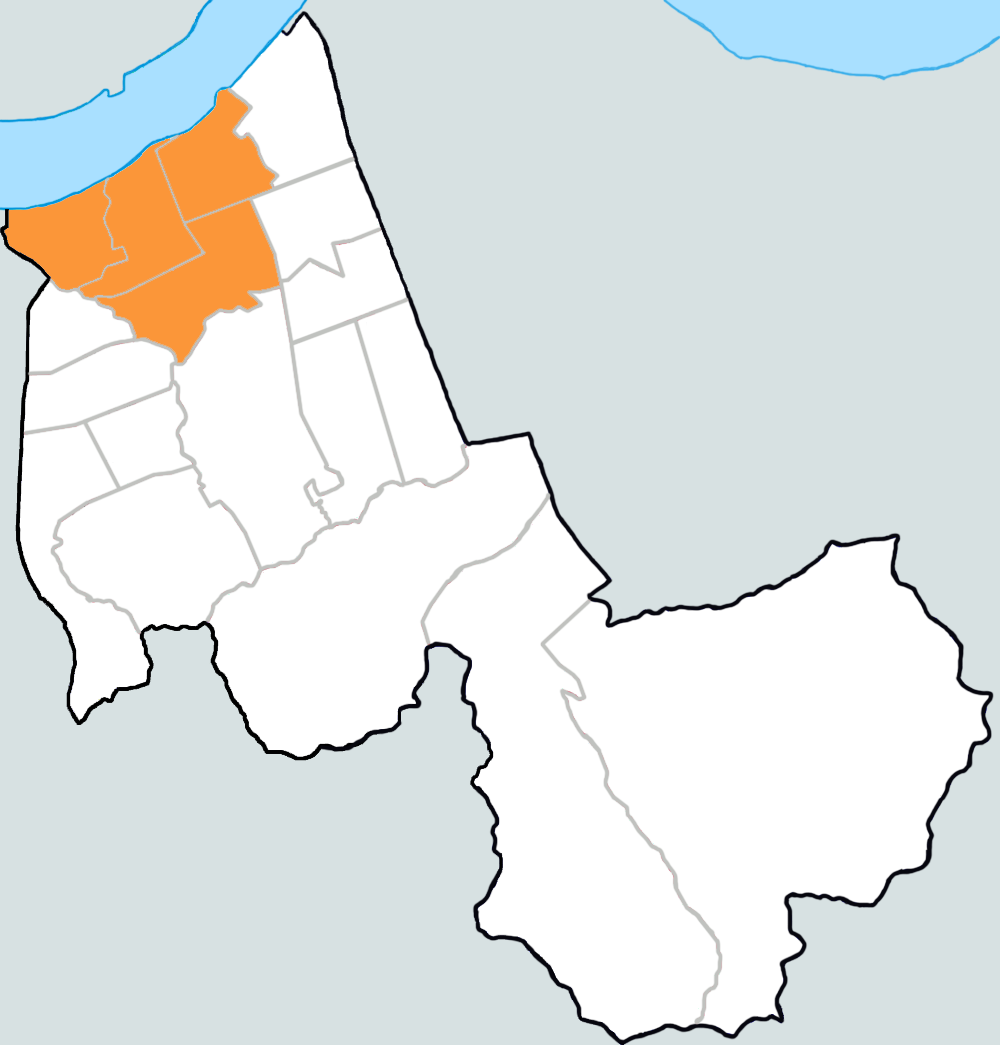
- Banpo-dong within Seocho District
- Country: South Korea

Area
  - Total: 5.9 km^{2} (2.3 sq mi)

Population (2012)
  - Total: 97,046
  - Density: 16,000/km^{2} (43,000/sq mi)

Korean name
- Hangul: 반포동
- Hanja: 盤浦洞
- RR: Banpo-dong
- MR: Panp'o-dong

Banpo-dong (Korean: 반포동) is a dong (neighborhood) of Seocho District, Seoul, South Korea. Banpo-dong is divided into five different dong which are Banpobon-dong, Banpo 1-dong, 2-dong, 3-dong and 4-dong.

The neighborhood is just north of Express Bus Terminal station and to the south of the Han River. Some of the apartment buildings were built in the late 1970s but the area is considered affluent due to its central location within Seoul, proximity to the Han River Park, shopping malls, and mass transit transportation options. This area is also specialized for education, since banpo-shopping-center contains numerous educational academies of the greater Gangnam area. Banpo is currently going on a constant re-modelling of the old apartments as well. Banpo is also famous for its French town which is called Seorae Village in the greater Gangnam area.

The area is home of Seorae Village, a small French enclave, with its large concentration of French residents and European-style restaurants, dessert cafés, as well as wineries and cafés stand along its main street.

The National Library of Korea is located in Banpo-dong. It was founded in 1945 in Sogong-dong, Jung-gu and was relocated to Banpo-dong in 1988.

Banpo Bridge is also located in the district.

== Education ==
- High Schools
  - Banpo High School
  - Sehwa High School
  - Sehwa Girls' High School
  - Sangmoon High School
  - Seoul High School
  - Yangjae High School
- Middle Schools
  - Bangbae Middle School
  - Banpo Middle School
  - Hangang Middle School
  - Sehwa Women's Middle School
  - Sinbanpo Middle School
  - Wonchon Middle School
- Elementary Schools
  - Banpo Elementary School
  - Banwon Elementary School
  - Gyeseong Elementary School
  - Jamwon Elementary School
  - Seowon Elementary School
  - Wonchon Elementary School
- International schools
  - French School of Seoul (Seorae Village)
  - Dulwich College Seoul

== Transportation ==
- Express Bus Terminal Station of, and
- Banpo Station of
- Nonhyeon Station of
- Sinbanpo Station of
- Gubanpo Station of
- Sapyeong Station of
- Sinnonhyeon Station of
- Seoul Express Bus Terminal

== Hospital ==
- Catholic university Seoul-Sungmo hospital
- Catholic university Seoul-Sungmo medication center
- Yonsei kids dentist office
- Hanul department of ophthalmology
- H plastic surgery center

== Police office ==
- Seoul Seocho police office
- Banpo public peace center

== Park ==
- Banpo Han river park
- Banpo Jangmi Park
- Shin Banpo Park
- Montmartre Park

== Apartment ==
- Banpo XI
- Banpo Raemian Firstige
- Banpo Riche
- Raemian One Bailey
- Acro River Park
- Raemian One Pentas

== Festival ==
- Banpo firework festival
- Banpo hanbul music festival
- Seoul Bamdokkaebi Night Market

== Library ==
- National library of Korea
- Seocho Gu Rip Banpo library

== Bridge ==
- Banpo bridge
- Banpo bridge rainbow fountain
- Nueu bride

== See also ==
- Administrative divisions of South Korea
