= Express Bus Terminal station =

Train station in South Korea

고속터미널; Express Bus Terminal
고속터미널; Express Bus Terminal
고속터미널; Express Bus Terminal
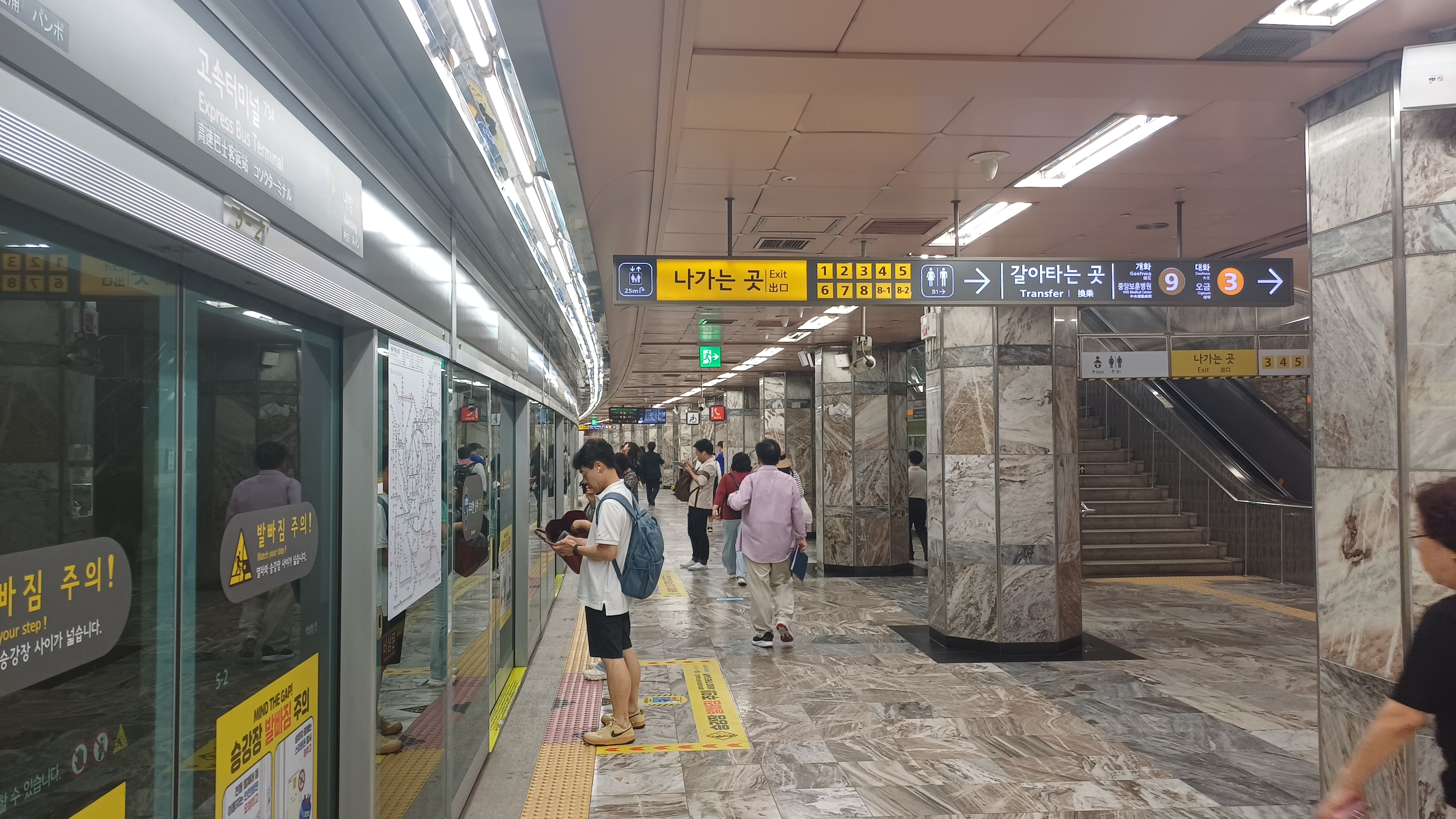
- Station Platform (Line 7)

Korean name
- Hangul: 고속터미널역
- Hanja: 高速터미널驛
- Revised Romanization: Gosokteomineollyeok
- McCune–Reischauer: Kosokt'ŏminŏllyŏk

General information
- Location: 188 Sinbanpo-ro, 19-11 Banpo-dong; Seocho-gu, Seoul
- Coordinates: 37°30′21″N 127°00′16″E
- Operator: Seoul Metro; Seoul Metro Line 9 Corporation
- Lines: Line 3 Line 7 Line 9
- Platforms: 6
- Tracks: 6
- Connections: Seoul Express Bus Terminal (Gyeongbu line); Central City Bus Terminal (Honam Line)

Construction
- Structure type: Underground

Key dates
- October 18, 1985: Line 3 opened
- August 1, 2000: Line 7 opened
- July 24, 2009: Line 9 opened

Passengers
- (Daily) Based on Jan-Dec of 2012. Line 3: 114,585; Line 7: 37,174; Line 9: 21,823
Services
Preceding station	Seoul Metropolitan Subway	Following station
Jamwon towards Daehwa	Line 3	Seoul National University of Education towards Ogeum
Banpo towards Jangam	Line 7	Naebang towards Seongnam
Sinbanpo towards Gaehwa	Line 9	Sapyeong towards VHS Medical Center
Dongjak towards Gimpo International Airport	Line 9 Express	Sinnonhyeon towards VHS Medical Center
Location

Express Bus Terminal Station is a station on Seoul Subway Line 3, Line 7, and Line 9. The stations are located in the Greater Gangnam Area, Banpo-dong, Seocho District, Seoul, Korea.

It is located underneath the Seoul Express Bus Terminal (a.k.a. Gangnam Bus Terminal). There are several stores, including clothing and book stores, located throughout the station. The station also offers free internet access. According to KT-published statistics in December 2010, the station was the network's most popular WiFi hotspot of all Seoul Metropolitan Subway stations, followed by Sadang Station, Dongdaemun Station, Jamsil Station and Jongno 3-ga Station. On November 19, 2010, the network's WiFi traffic at the station peaked at 23 gigabytes.

This station is one of the most crowded subway stations in the country, along with Gangnam station, Jamsil, Samseong, Sindorim, and Sillim Station.

The newly renovated Shinsegae department store is now connected from exit 8 into the famille street food section.

== Station layout ==
=== Line 3 ===
Seoul Nat'l Univ. of Education ↑
S/B | | N/B
↓ Jamwon

Northbound	← ● Line 3 toward Daehwa
Southbound	● Line 3 toward Ogeum →

=== Line 7 ===
Banpo ↑
S/B | | N/B
↓ Naebang

Southbound	← ● Line 7 toward Seongnam
Northbound	● Line 7 toward Jangam →

=== Line 9 ===
Dongjak (express) ↑
Sinbanpo (local) ↑
S/B | | N/B
↓ Sinnonhyeon (express)
↓ Sapyeong (local)

Northbound	← ● Line 9 local toward Gaehwa ← ● Line 9 express toward Gimpo Int'l Airport
Southbound	● Line 9 toward VHS Medical Center →

== History ==
- October 18, 1985: This station was opened on Line 3.
- August 1, 2000: The Line 7 was opened, making this station a transfer point.
- July 24, 2009: The Line 9 was opened, thus adding another station in this transfer point.

== Exits ==
- Exit 1 : Seoul Express Bus Terminal (Gyeongbu Line, Yeongdong Line)
- Exit 2 : Banpo Mido APT, Forwarding Agency
- Exit 3 : JW Marriott Hotel Seoul, Shinsegae Department Store Gangnam
- Exit 4 : Catholic University of Korea
- Exit 5 : National Library of Korea, Seoul Palace Hotel
- Exit 6 : Jamwon Elementary School
- Exit 7 : Central City (Honam Line)
- Exit 8 : New Banpo APT, Hanshin APT
- Exit 8-1: Hangang Park
- Exit 8-2 : Banwon Elementary School

== Vicinity ==
Central City is a national transportation hub, as it connects two major subway lines (No.3 and No.7) that provide access to the Seoul Metropolitan Area, to several bus routes that provide access to other cities throughout South Korea. There are over 60 local bus service routes, airport limousine buses to Incheon International Airport and express buses connecting to almost 60 cities around Korea. Also within Central City is Shinsegae Department store, Marriott Hotel and Central Park. There are various facilities such as ceremony halls, Millennium Hall for large-scale events and other convenient facilities such as banks, clinics, a stock exchange, a post office and a large-scale parking lot. Central City is known as a complex building, which improved the status of Korean architectural culture, according to its complex cultural facilities. Central City is a high-quality shopping mall with 'Marques Plaza', 'Youngpoong Bookstore', 'Central 6 Cinema' 'Theme Park'. Within the complex, the World Food Court offers food from around the globe in an upscale, department store environment. Within Shinsegae Department Store, there are foreign clothing outlets including Banana Republic and The Gap, among others. Some of these shops have clothing that is imported from abroad, thus having "western" sizes that are difficult to find in Korea. Directions : At Express Bus Terminal (Seoul Subway Line No.3) Exit No.2 → Walk towards Honamseon → Entrance of Central City → Young Plaza (B1 floor) Express Bus Terminal (Seoul Subway Line No.3) Exit No.2 → Walk towards Shinsegae Department Store, Honamseon → Central City (1st floor)

Gangnam Express Bus Station Clothing Market: is an underground market with over 1,000 stores. It was opened in 1982 and located in Banpo-dong. It sells low price items such as clothes, wedding items, souvenirs, seasonal items, flowers, and electronics. It runs along entire city blocks and offer refuge during cold winters and humid summer.

== Passengers ==
Station	Passengers						
Station	2000	2001	2002	2003	2004	2005	2006
Line 3	47176	58695	61369	61451	62298	62343	62075
Line 7	7951	9262	9787	10985	12211	13499	14143

== Gallery ==
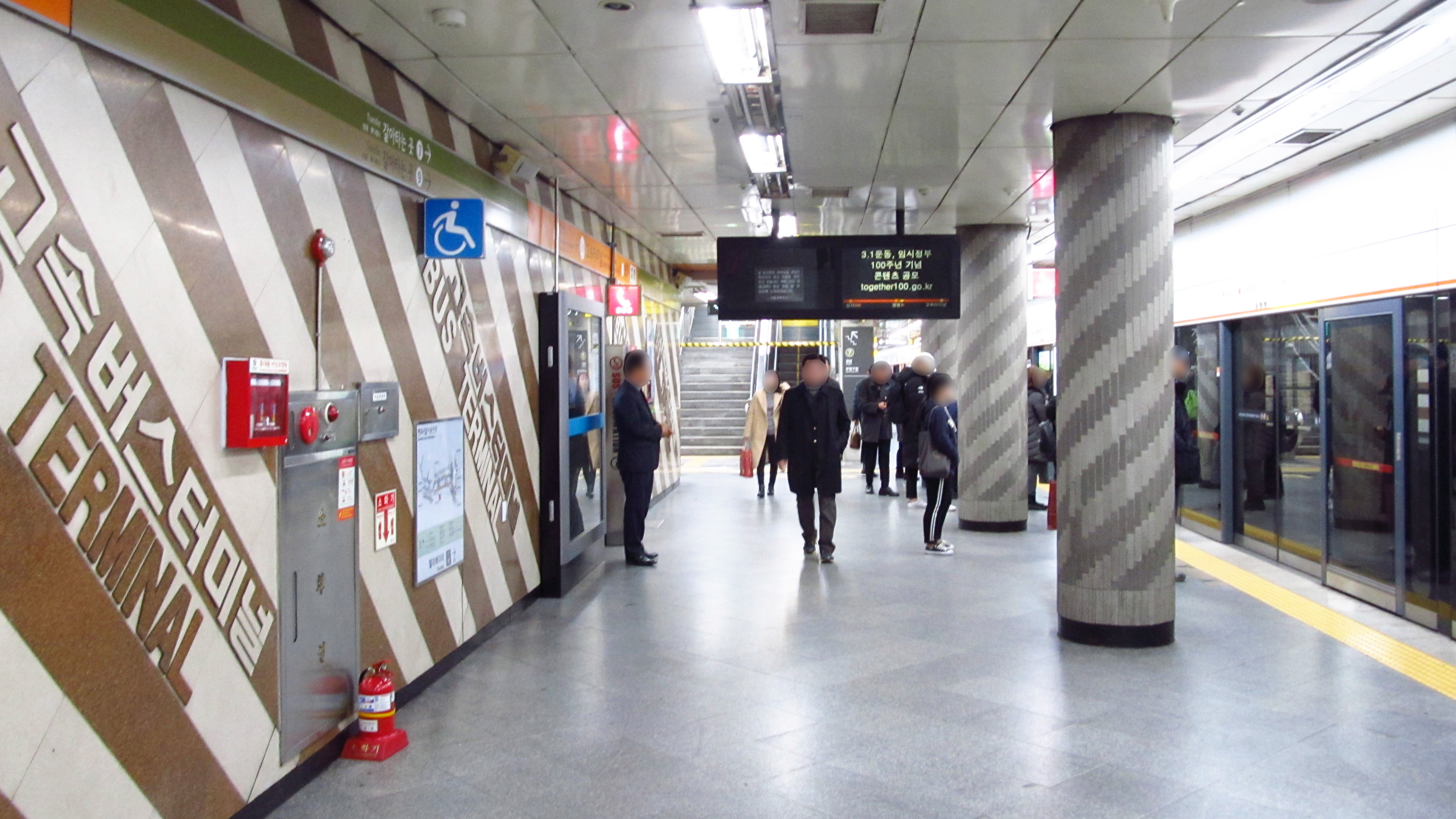
Platform at Line 3

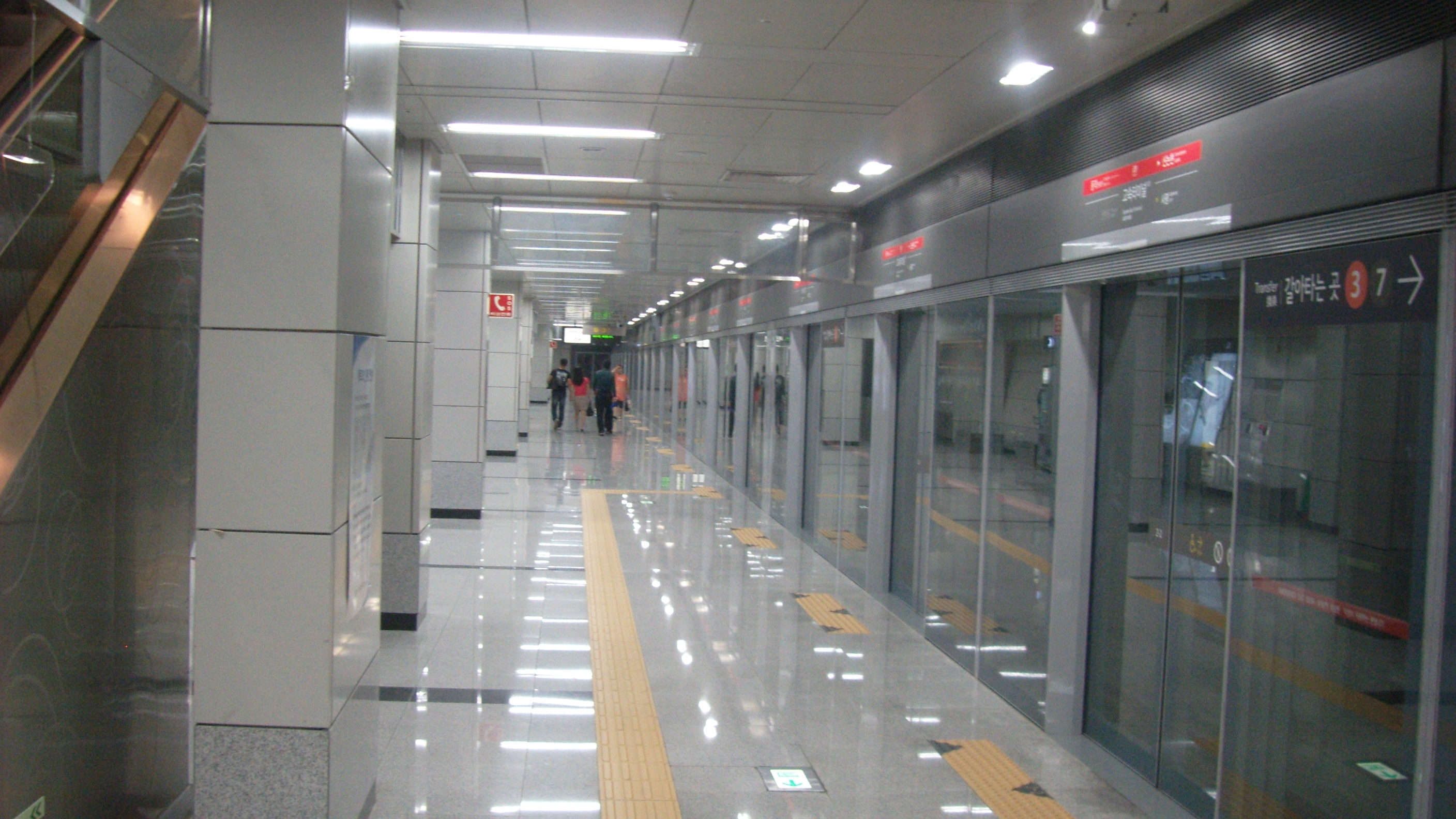
Platform at Line 9

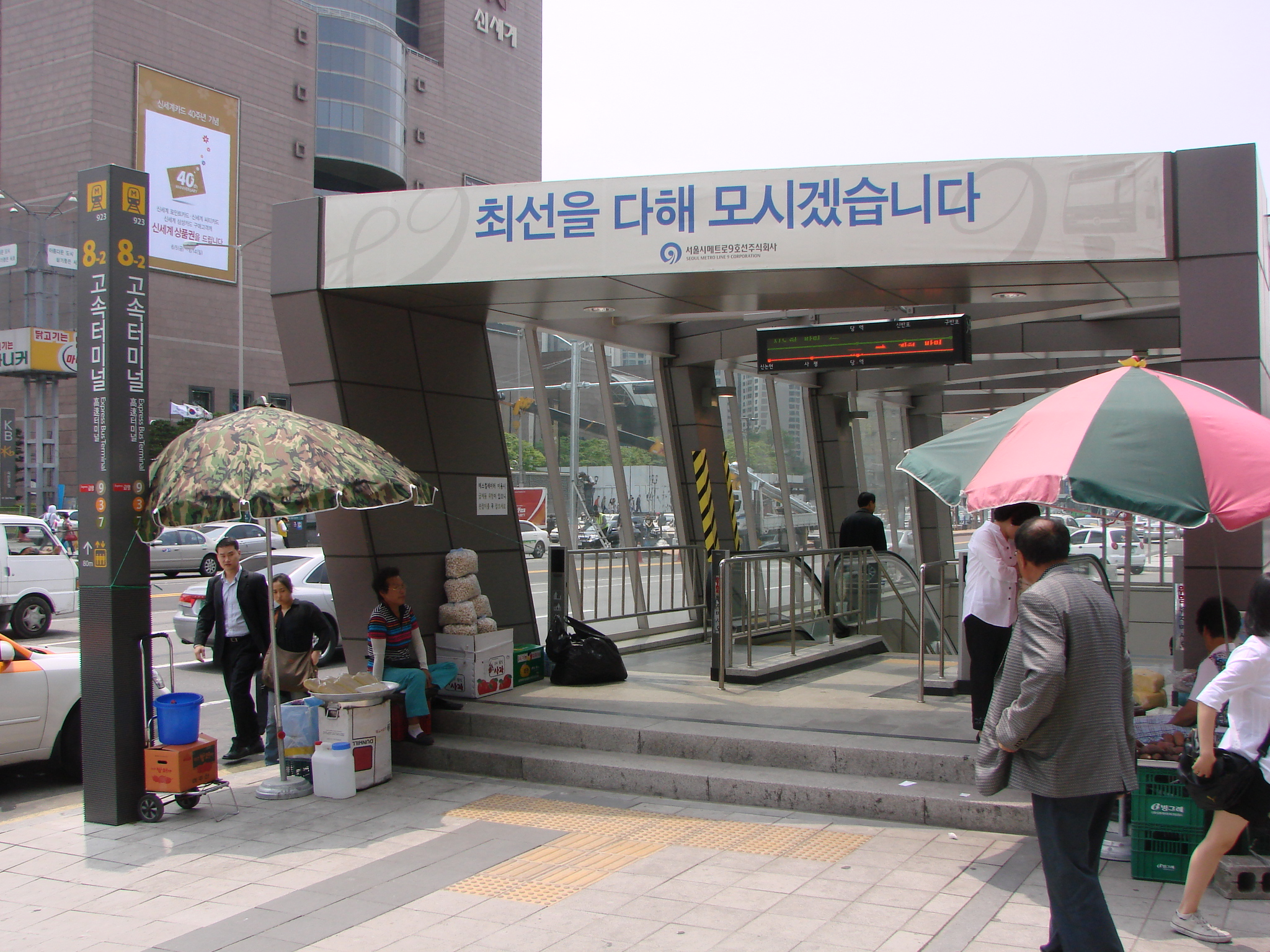
Exit 8-2

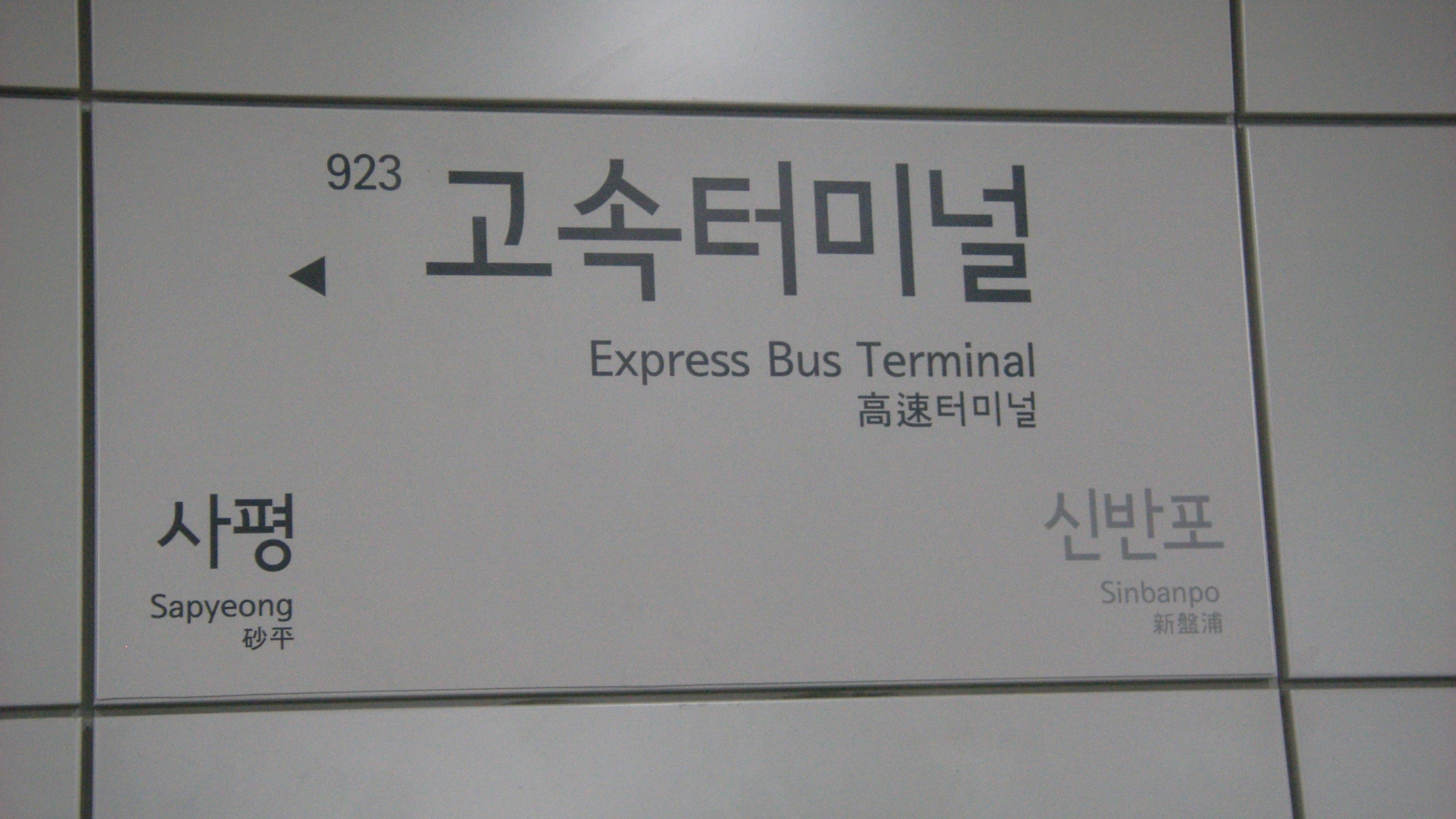
Line 9 station sign

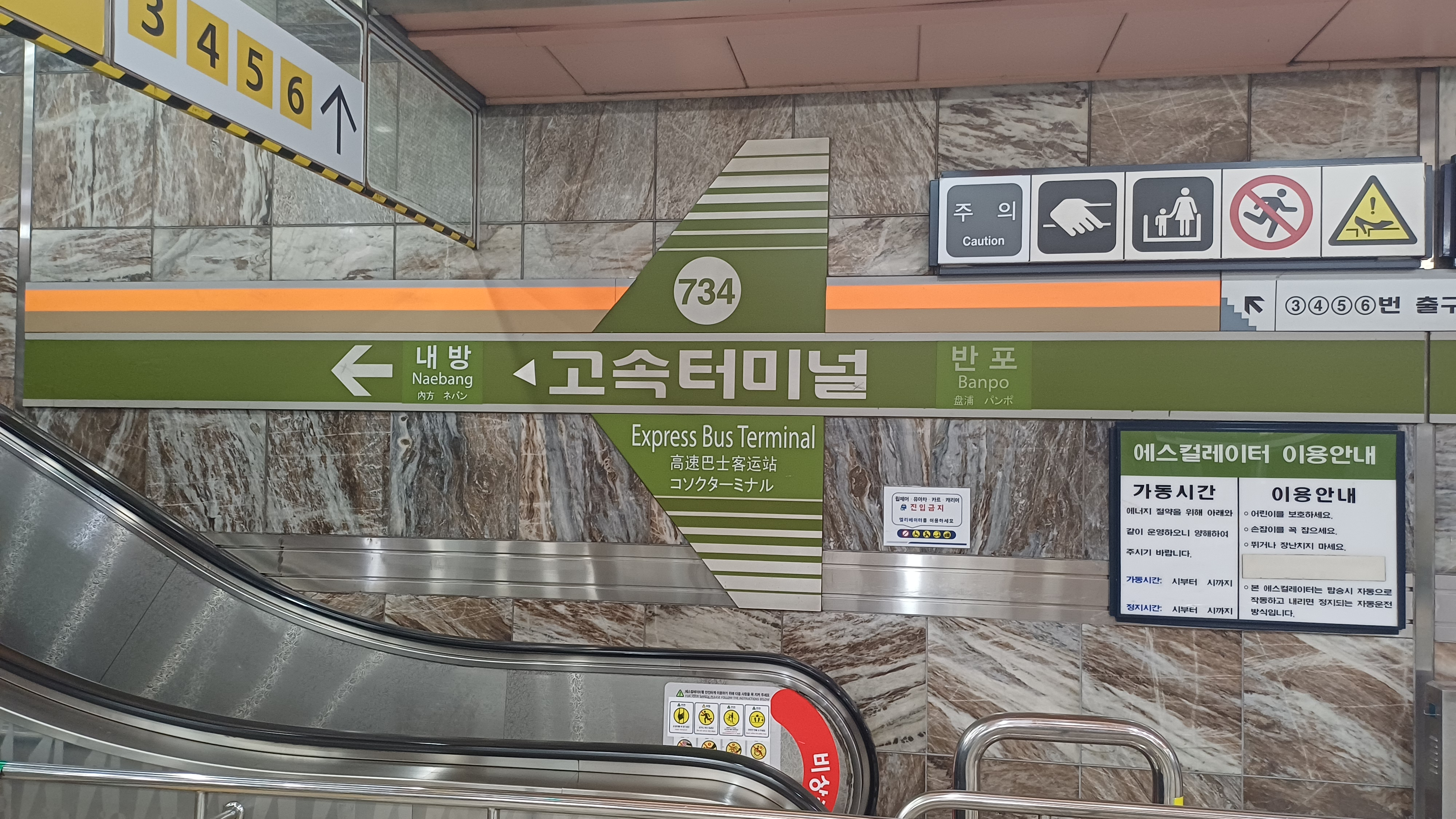
Line 7 station sign

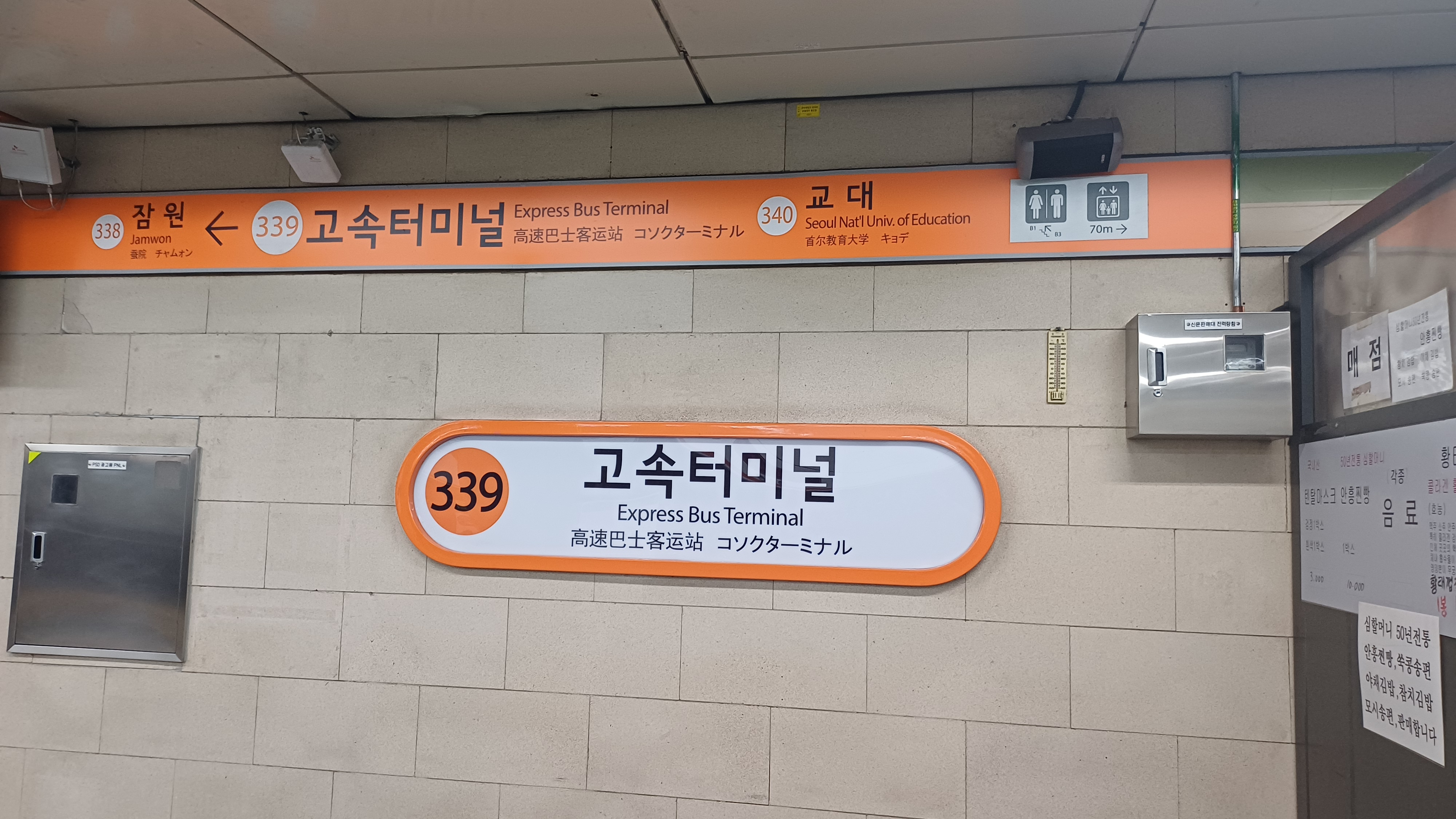
Line 3 station sign
