= Jamwon station =

Train station in Seoul, South Korea

잠원; Jamwon
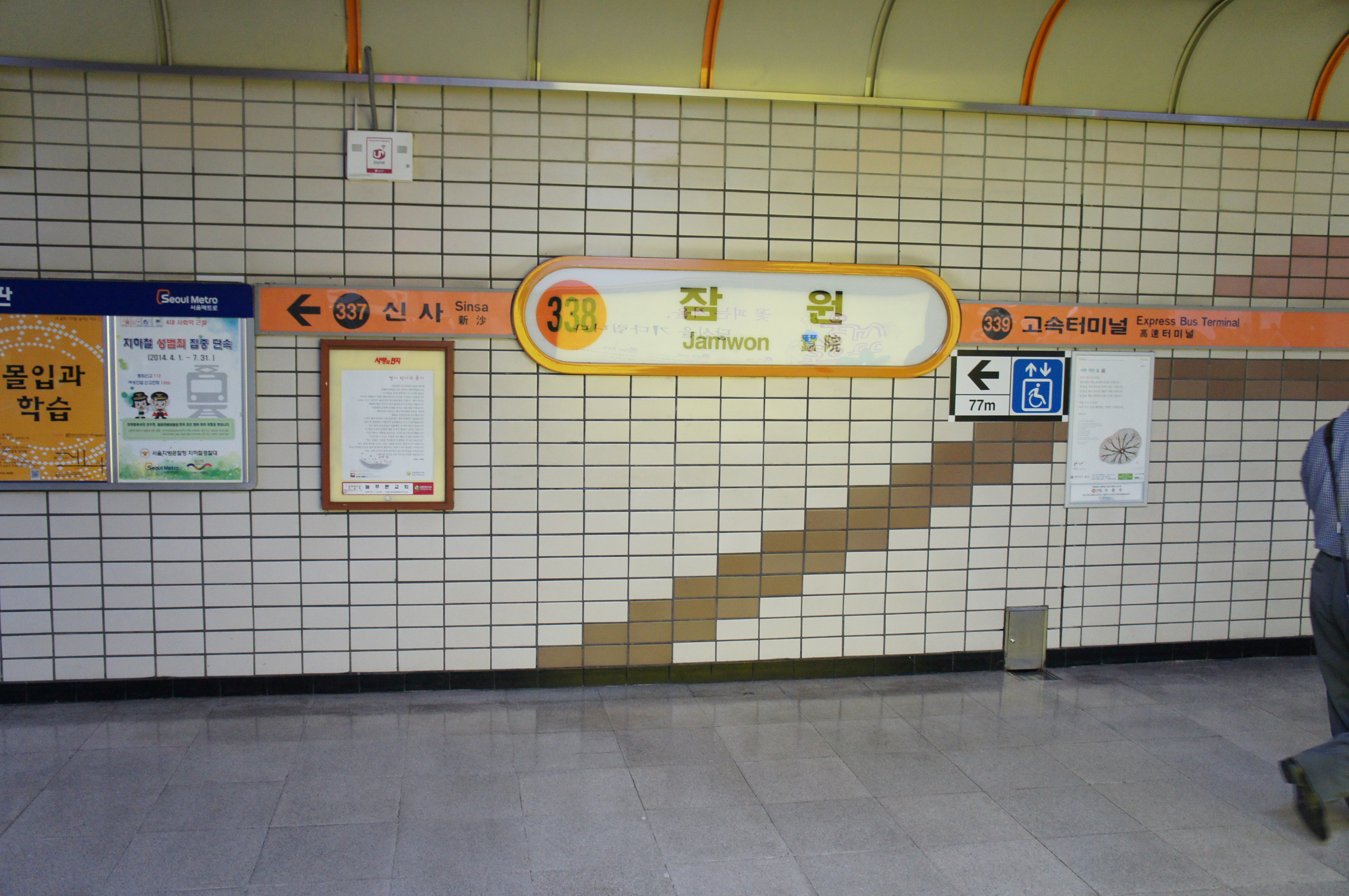

Korean name
- Hangul: 잠원역
- Hanja: 蠶院驛
- Revised Romanization: Jamwonnyeok
- McCune–Reischauer: Chamwŏnnyŏk

General information
- Location: 46 Jamwon-ro 4-gil Jiha, 100-1 Jamwon-dong, Seocho-gu, Seoul
- Coordinates: 37°30′46″N 127°00′40″E
- Operated by: Seoul Metro
- Line(s): Line 3
- Platforms: 2
- Tracks: 2

Construction
- Structure type: Underground

Key dates
- October 18, 1985: Line 3 opened

Passengers
- (Daily) Based on Jan-Dec of 2012. Line 3: 12,838

Jamwon Station (Korean: 잠원역) is a station on the Seoul Subway Line 3. It is located in Jamwon-dong, Seocho District, Seoul.

== Surrounding ==
There are Kyungwon Junior High School, Banpo General Social Welfare Center, Banpo 3 Resident Center, Hangang Citizen Park Jamwon District, Shindong Elementary School, Shindong Middle School, Jamwon Security Center and Jamwon-dong Residents Center.

== Station layout ==
G	Street level	Exit

L1; Concourse	Lobby	Customer Service, Shops, Vending machines, ATMs

L2; Platform	Side platform, doors will open on the right
L2; Platform	Northbound	← Line 3 toward Daehwa (Sinsa)
L2; Platform	Southbound	Line 3 toward Ogeum (Express Bus Terminal) →
L2; Platform	Side platform, doors will open on the right

== Entrance ==
- Exit 1 : Hanshin APT
- Exit 2 : Gyeongwon Middle School
- Exit 3 : Hangang Citizens's Park of Jamwon
- Exit 4 : Sindong Elementary & Middle Schools

== Passengers ==
Station	Number of passengers						
Station	2000년	2001년	2002년	2003년	2004년	2005년	2006년
Line 3	7081	6687	6737	6728	6850	6700	6553

Preceding station	Seoul Metropolitan Subway	Following station
Sinsa towards Daehwa	Line 3	Express Bus Terminal towards Ogeum
