= Central City (Seoul) =

Complex of buildings in Seoul, South Korea

Central City Inc.
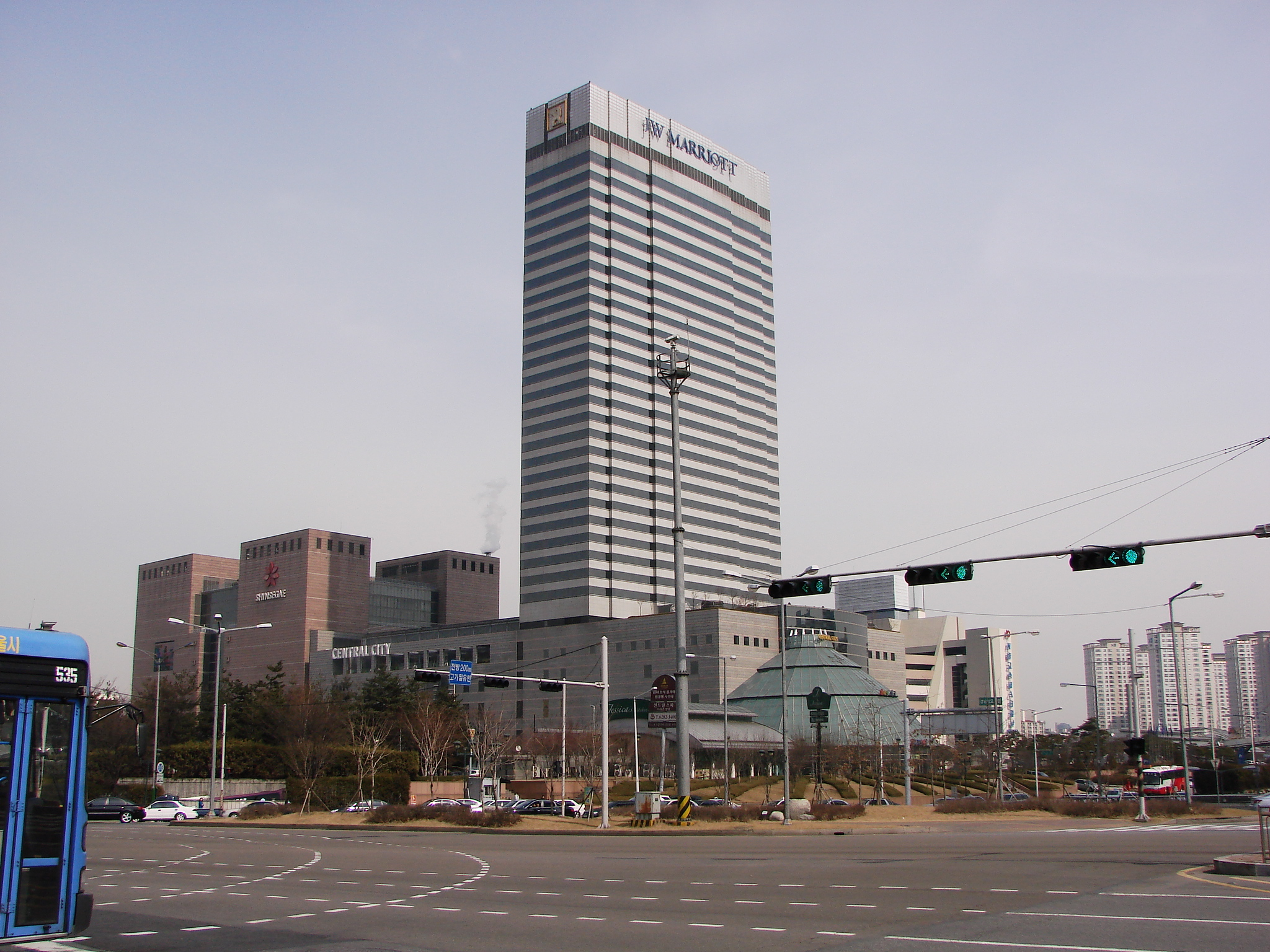
- Central City
- Formerly: Seoul General Terminal (1968–1998)
- Type: Joint-stock company
- Founded: 13 January 1969; 57 years ago
- Founder: Shin Seon Ho
- Headquarters: Seocho, Seoul, South Korea
- Revenue: ▲ ₩138.49 billion (2016)
- Operating income: ▲ ₩70.26 billion (2016)
- Net income: ▲ ₩50.52 billion (2016)
- Total assets: ▲ ₩2.62 trillion (2016)
- Total equity: ▲ ₩1.03 trillion (2016)
- Parent: Shinsegae Group
- Subsidiaries: Seoul Express Bus Terminal
- Website: www.centralcityseoul.co.kr

Central City (Korean: 센트럴시티) is a complex of buildings in Seoul, South Korea.

Central City, originally called Seoul General Terminal (서울종합터미날), was planned as a new intercity bus terminal in mid-1970s. The original plan was changed to accommodate Honam and Yeongdong line express bus lines due to the neighbouring Seoul Express Bus Terminal being overcrowded. Yulsan Group bought the terminal site from Seoul City government in 1977. Actual construction started in December 1994. Central City opened on 1 September 1999. In 2012, Shinsegae Group bought a 60.02% share of Central City.

Central City consists of three commercial areas: bus terminal, department store, and shopping mall. Among these buildings are the JW Marriott Hotel Seoul, Central City Terminal, Megabox movie theater, Shinsegae and Bandinlunis bookstore.

== Central City Terminal ==
The main feature of this complex is bus terminal. Central City terminal, shown as 서울호남 (Seoul-Honam) or 센트럴 (Central) on tickets, is a main gateway for express bus routes from Jeolla and part of Chungcheong region. Central City is served by the following express and intercity bus lines:

Destination	via	Frequency
Gwangju	Jeongan SA	5-30 min.
Jeonju	Jeongan SA, Honamjeilmun (gate)	5-20 min.
Iksan	Jeongan SA, Palbong-dong, Iksan Ind. Zone	30 min.
Gunsan	Jeongan SA, Daeya	15-30 min.
Jeongeup	Jeongan SA, Taein	40-50 min.
Namwon	Jeongan SA	40-80 min.
Gimje	Jeongan SA, Jeonbuk Inno. City, Aetong-ri	4 /day
Jinan	Ancheon	2 /day
Sunchang	Gangjin (Jeollabuk-do)	5 /day
Gochang	Heungdeok	45-60 min.
Buan		45-60 min.
Mokpo	Jeongan SA	30-40 min.
Damyang	Jeongan SA	4 /day
Yeosu	Jeongan SA, Yeocheon	40-60 min.
Suncheon	Jeongan SA, Suncheon Univ.	30-40 min.
Gangjin, Jeollanam-do	Jeongan SA	6 /day
Jido	Muan, Haeje	2 /day
Yuseong, Daejeon		15 min.
Yeonmudae	Jeongan SA, Nonsan	40-45 min.
