= Sinbanpo station =

Station of the Seoul Subway

Coordinates: 37°30′12″N 126°59′45″E

| 신반포; Sinbanpo |
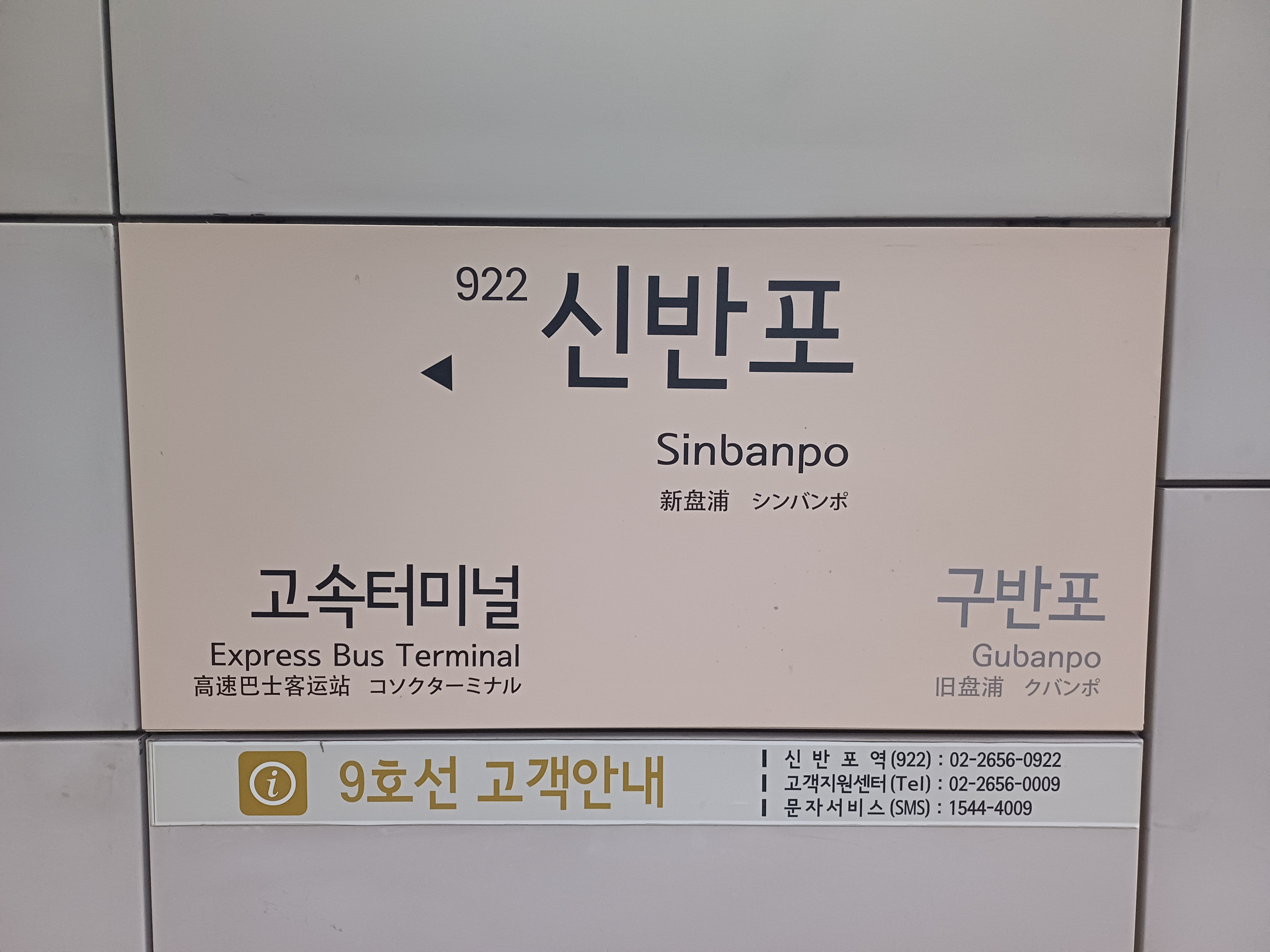

Korean name
- Hangul: 신반포역
- Hanja: 新盤浦驛
- Revised Romanization: Sinbanpo-yeok
- McCune–Reischauer: Sinbanp'o-yŏk

General information
- Location: 14-1 Banpo-dong; Seocho-gu, Seoul
- Operator: Seoul Metro Line 9 Corporation
- Line: Line 9
- Platforms: 2 (2 side platforms)
- Tracks: 2
- Bus routes: 148 360 361 362 406 462 540 640 642 643; 4212 4318 4425 6411; 9408; 9500 9501; Seocho 10 14; 6000

Construction
- Structure type: Underground

History
- Opened: July 24, 2009
Location

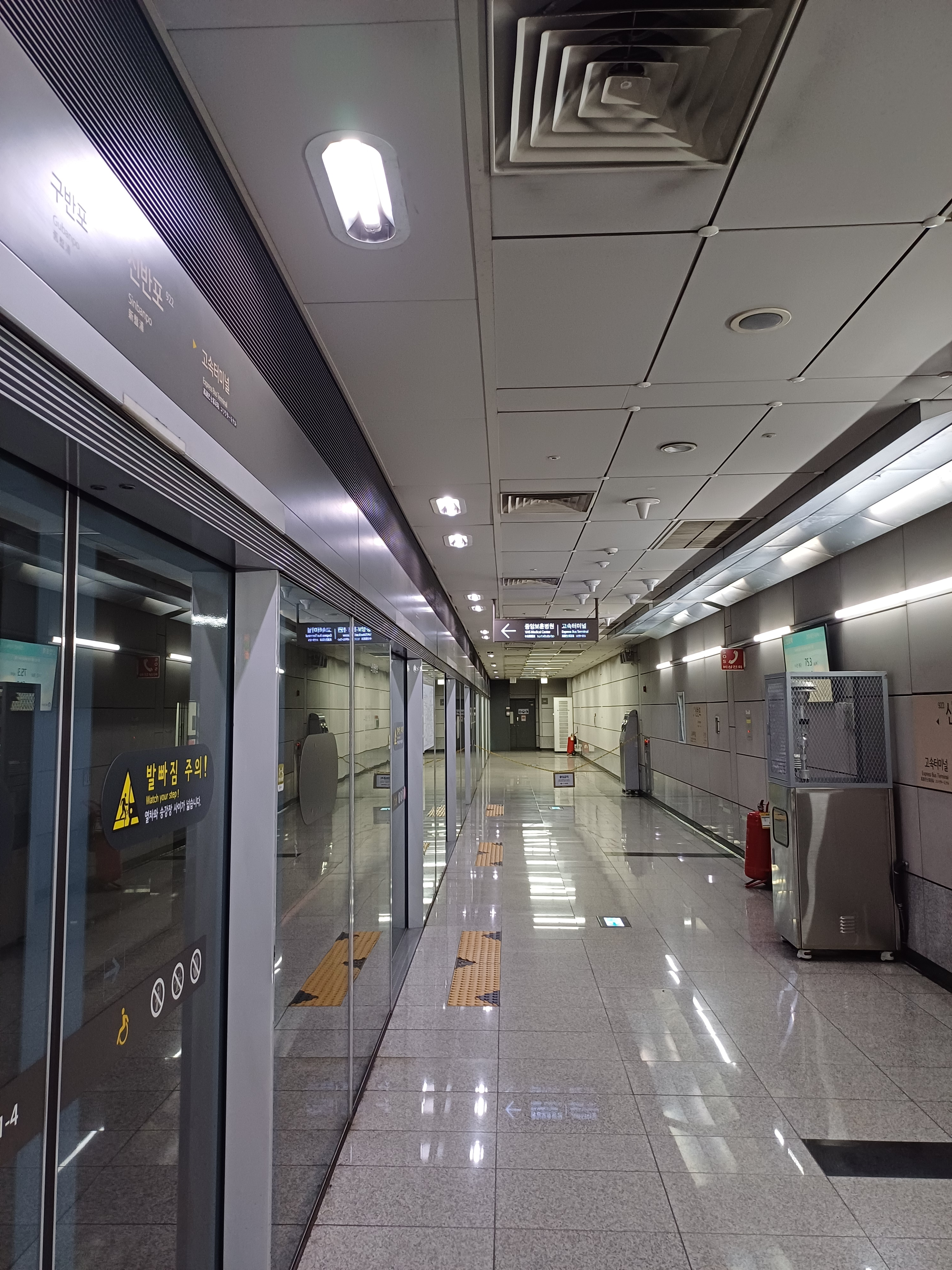
Station platform

Sinbanpo Station is a railway station on Line 9 of the Seoul Subway.

== Station layout ==
| G | Street level | Exit |

| L1; Concourse | Lobby | (as of October 15, 2020) a GS25, station office, a discount clothing store, photo booth, bathrooms, and 3 benches. |

| L2; Platform level | Side platform, doors will open on the right |
| L2; Platform level | Westbound | ← Line 9 Local toward Gaehwa (Gubanpo) ← Line 9 Express does not stop here |
| L2; Platform level | Eastbound | Line 9 Local toward VHS Medical Center (Express Bus Terminal) → Line 9 Express does not stop here → |
| L2; Platform level | Side platform, doors will open on the right |

| Preceding station | Seoul Metropolitan Subway | Following station |
|---|---|---|
| Gubanpo towards Gaehwa | Line 9 | Express Bus Terminal towards VHS Medical Center |
