= Wonji-dong =

Neighborhood in Seoul, South Korea

Coordinates: 35°18′N 127°58′E

- Interactive map of Wonji-dong
- Country: South Korea

Korean name
- Hangul: 원지동
- Hanja: 院趾洞
- RR: Wonji-dong
- MR: Wŏnji-dong

Wonji-dong (Korean: 원지동) is a dong (neighbourhood) of Seocho District, Seoul, South Korea. It is a legal dong (법정동 法定洞) administered under its administrative dong (행정동 行政洞), Yangjae 2-dong.

== See also ==
- Yeomgokcheon (염곡천 廉谷川)
- Administrative divisions of South Korea
