= Sapyeong station =

Train station in South Korea

Coordinates: 37.50416°N 127.01522°E

사평; Sapyeong
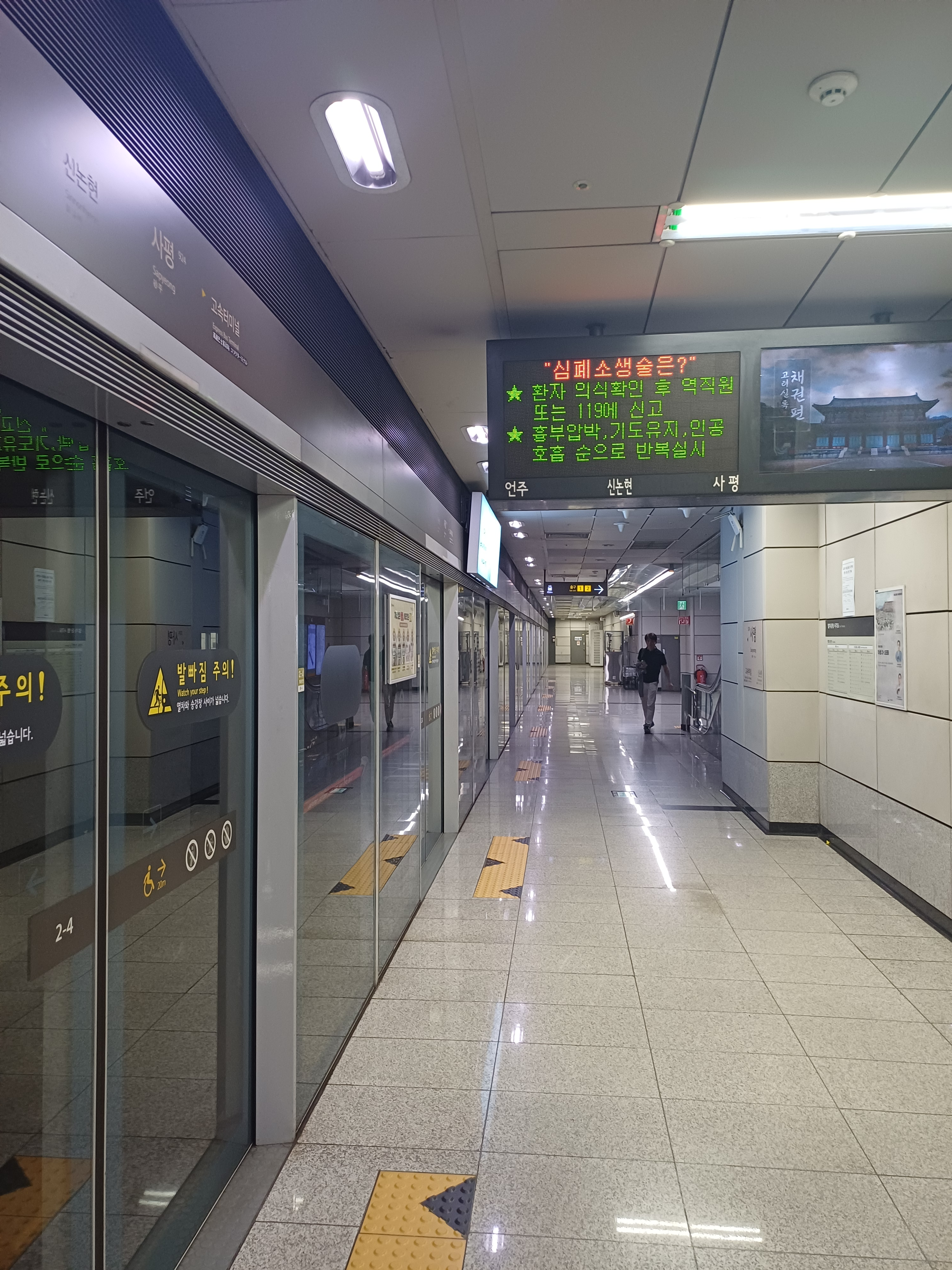
- Station Platform

Korean name
- Hangul: 사평역
- Hanja: 砂平驛
- Revised Romanization: Sapyeong-yeok
- McCune–Reischauer: Sap'yŏng-yŏk

General information
- Location: 30 Banpo-dong; Seocho-gu, Seoul
- Operator: Seoul Metro Line 9 Corporation
- Line: Line 9
- Platforms: 2 side platforms
- Tracks: 4 (2 bypass tracks)
- Bus routes: 643 8541; 3420; 1500-3

Construction
- Structure type: Underground

History
- Opened: July 24, 2009
Location

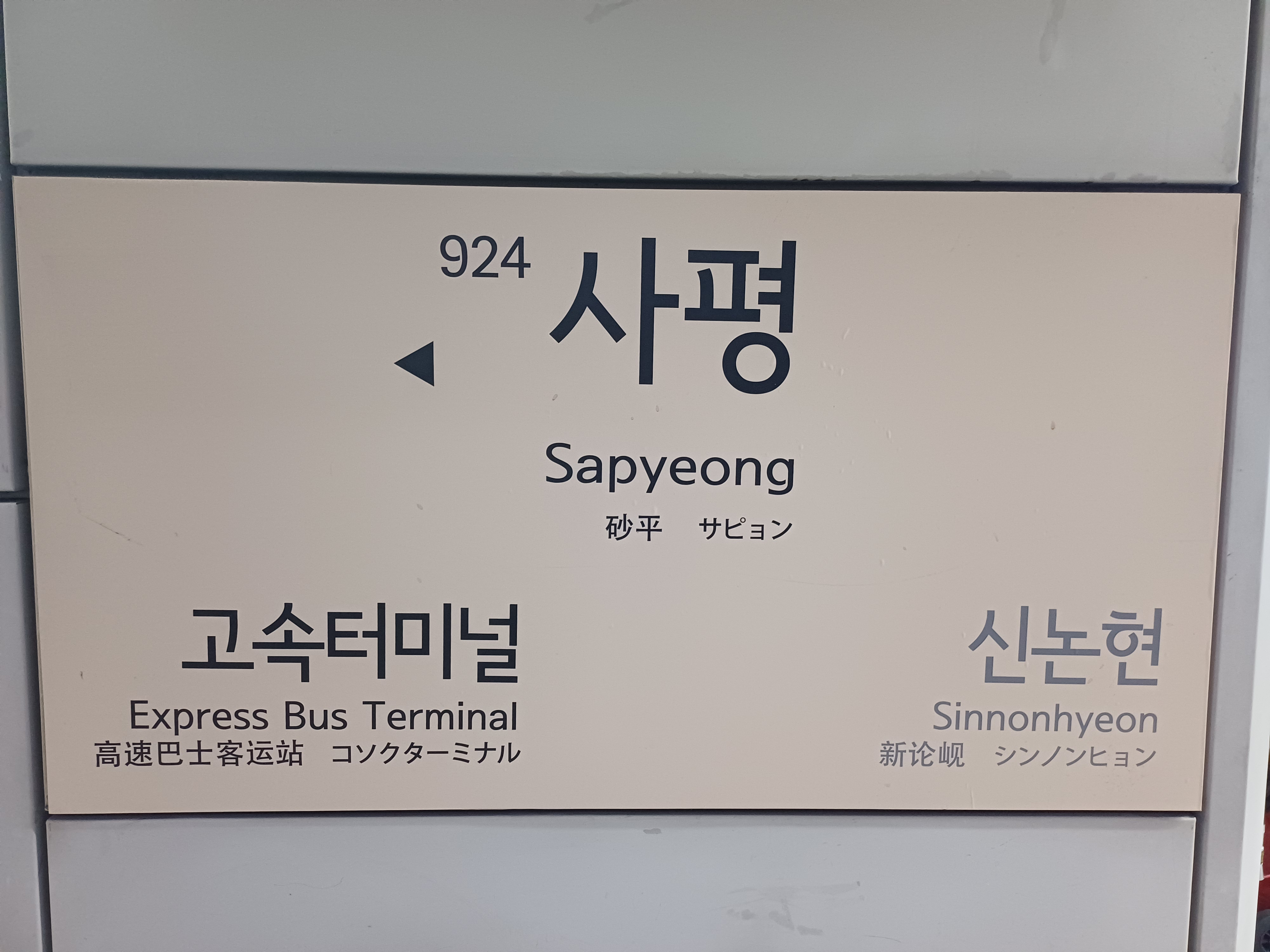
Station nameplate

Sapyeong Station is a railway station on Line 9 of the Seoul Subway.

== Station layout ==
G	Street level	Exit

L1; Concourse	Lobby	Customer Service, Shops, Vending machines, ATMs

L2; Platform level	Side platform, doors will open on the right
L2; Platform level	Westbound local	← Line 9 Local toward Gaehwa (Express Bus Terminal)
L2; Platform level	Westbound express	← Line 9 Express does not stop here
L2; Platform level	Eastbound express	Line 9 Express does not stop here →
L2; Platform level	Eastbound local	Line 9 Local toward VHS Medical Center (Sinnonhyeon)→
L2; Platform level	Side platform, doors will open on the right

Preceding station	Seoul Metropolitan Subway	Following station
Express Bus Terminal towards Gaehwa	Line 9	Sinnonhyeon towards VHS Medical Center
