= Banpo station =

Station of the Seoul Metropolitan Subway

Coordinates: 37°30′29″N 127°00′42″E

반포; Banpo
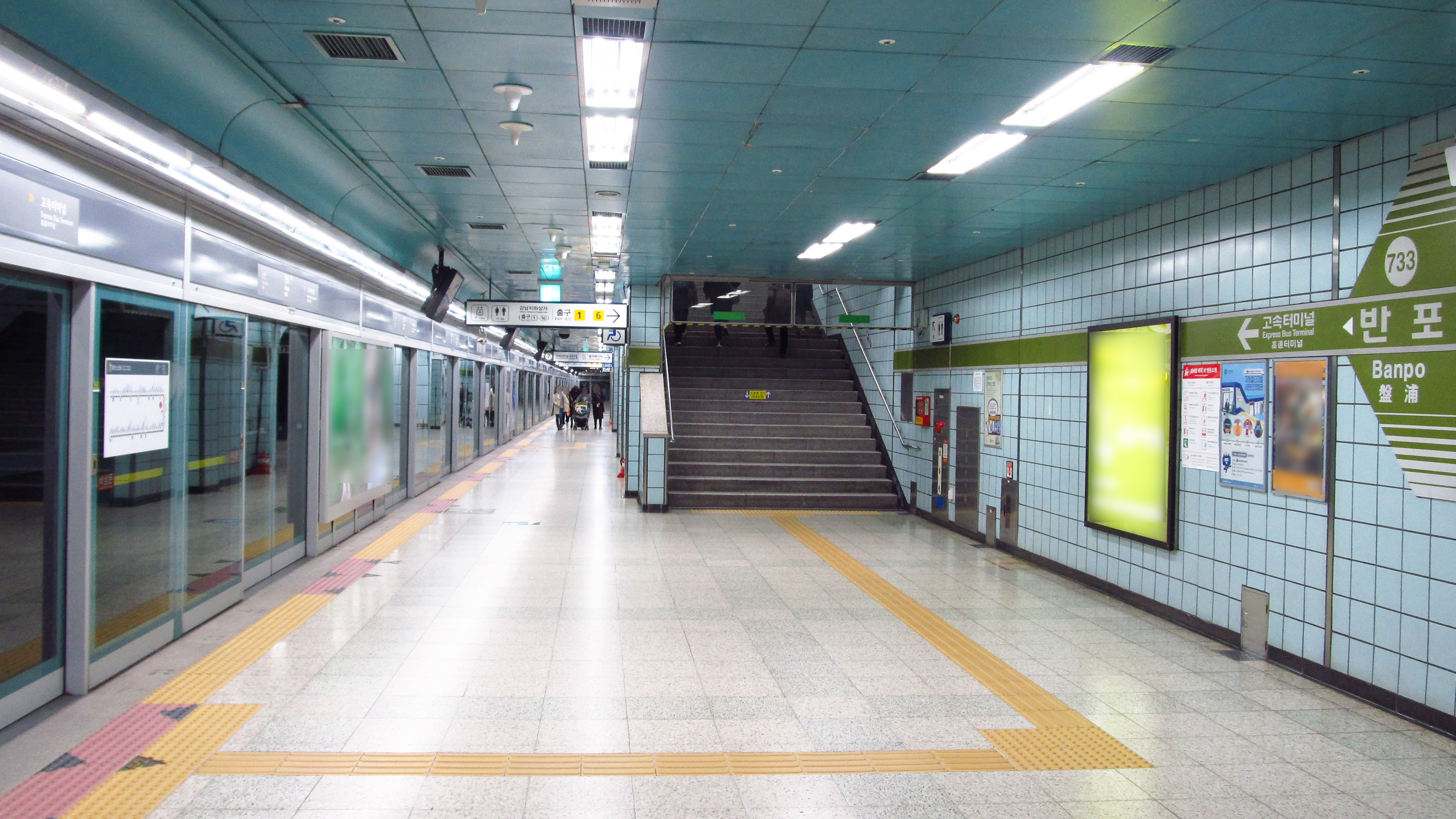
- Station Platform

Korean name
- Hangul: 반포역
- Hanja: 盤浦驛
- Revised Romanization: Banpo-yeok
- McCune–Reischauer: Panp'o-yŏk

General information
- Location: 103 Jamwon-dong, Seocho-gu, Seoul
- Operated by: Seoul Metro
- Line(s): Line 7
- Platforms: 2
- Tracks: 2

Construction
- Structure type: Underground

Key dates
- August 1, 2000: Line 7 opened

Banpo Station is a metro station on Seoul Subway Line 7 located in Jamwon-dong, Seocho District, Seoul. Despite its name, the station is not located in Banpo-dong, but instead in Jamwon. It has 6 entrances that they are all right side entrance and they have screen doors right before entering the train. It takes 4~8 minutes between 2 trains and next stations are Nonhyeon and Seoul Express Bus Terminal. It is only 500m long between Banpo station and two other Stations next to it. The station number is 733.

== Station layout ==
Nonhyeon ↑
| N/B
↓ Express Bus Terminal

Southbound	← ● Line 7 toward Seongnam
Northbound	● Line 7 toward Jangam →

== Vicinity ==
- Exit 1 : Wonchon Elementary & Middle Schools
- Exit 2 : Way to Banpo 1 dong
- Exit 3 : Junction of Express Bus Terminal, townoffice of Banpo 1 dong
- Exit 4 : Junction of Express Bus Terminal, townoffice of Banpo 1 dong (opposite side from Exit 4)
- Exit 5 : Kyongwon Middle School
- Exit 6 : Jamwon-dong, Banpo Social Welfare Center

== Passengers ==
Station	Passenger						
Station	2000	2001	2002	2003	2004	2005	2006
Line 7	3842	4731	5367	5592	5662	5637	5157

== Places around station ==
- New Town
- Banpo Xi Apartment
- Donga Apartment
- Kyongwon Middle School
- Seoul Express Bus Terminal
- Banpo Bus Station

== History ==
SMRT built Banpo Station and they started to run Banpo Station on August 1, 2000. Banpo Station started to run when line number 7 started.

Preceding station	Seoul Metropolitan Subway	Following station
Nonhyeon towards Jangam	Line 7	Express Bus Terminal towards Seongnam
