= Seoul Express Bus Terminal =

Bus station in Seoul, South Korea

Coordinates: 37°30′22″N 127°00′25″E

The Seoul Express Bus Terminal (a.k.a. Gangnam Bus Terminal) is the key bus terminal located in Seocho-gu, Seoul.

Seoul Express Bus Terminal (2013)

It is connected underground to both the Gangnam branch of the Shinsaegae department store and the banpo underground market, as well as containing its own share of stores.

== Routes ==
=== Express Bus ===
To	Destination
Gyeonggi-do	Icheon, Yeoju, Yongin (via Yubang-dong), Pyeongtaek (via Pyeongtaek University), Anseong (via Gongdo, Jungang University, Hankyong University)
Gangwon-do	Wonju (via Munmak), Gangneung, Yangyang, Sokcho, Samcheok (via Donghae)
Chungcheong-do	Daejeon, Daejeon Government Complex, Gongju, Cheonan, Onyang (Asan), Geumsan (via Majeon), Jochiwon (via Korea University, Hongik University), Sejong (via Korea University, Hongik University, Jochiwon), Cheongju, Jecheon (via Haso-dong)
Gyeongsang-do	Andong, Dongdaegu (via Seodaegu), Gimcheon, Gumi (via Hwanggan), Jeomchon (Mungyeong), Sangju, Yecheon, Yeongcheon (via Gyeongbuk Provincial Office New Town), Yeongju (via Danyang) Gyeongju, Pohang, Jinju, Tongyeong, Gimhae (via Jangyu-dong), Masan (via Naeseo), Changwon (via Changwon Station), Uljin (via Gwangbi, Samgeun, Baekam Hot Spring) Ulsan, Busan, Seobusan

== Transportation ==
=== Subway ===
- Express Bus Terminal Station ( and)

=== City Bus ===
- Local Bus: Seocho 01, Seocho 10, Seocho 13, Seocho 14, Seocho 21
- Branch Bus: 3012, 3414, 4212, 4318, 5413, 6411, 8541
- Trunk Bus: 142, 143, 148, 351, 360, 362, 401, 406, 462, 540, 640, 642, 643, 740
- Rapid Bus: 9408
- Airport Bus: 6000, 6020
- Incheon Rapid Bus: 9500, 9501, 9502, 9510, 9800, 9802

== See also ==
- Central City
