= Sinnonhyeon station =

Station of the Seoul Metropolitan Subway

Coordinates: 37°30′16″N 127°01′28″E

신논현 (토스); Sinnonhyeon (Toss)
D06
신논현
Sinnonhyeon
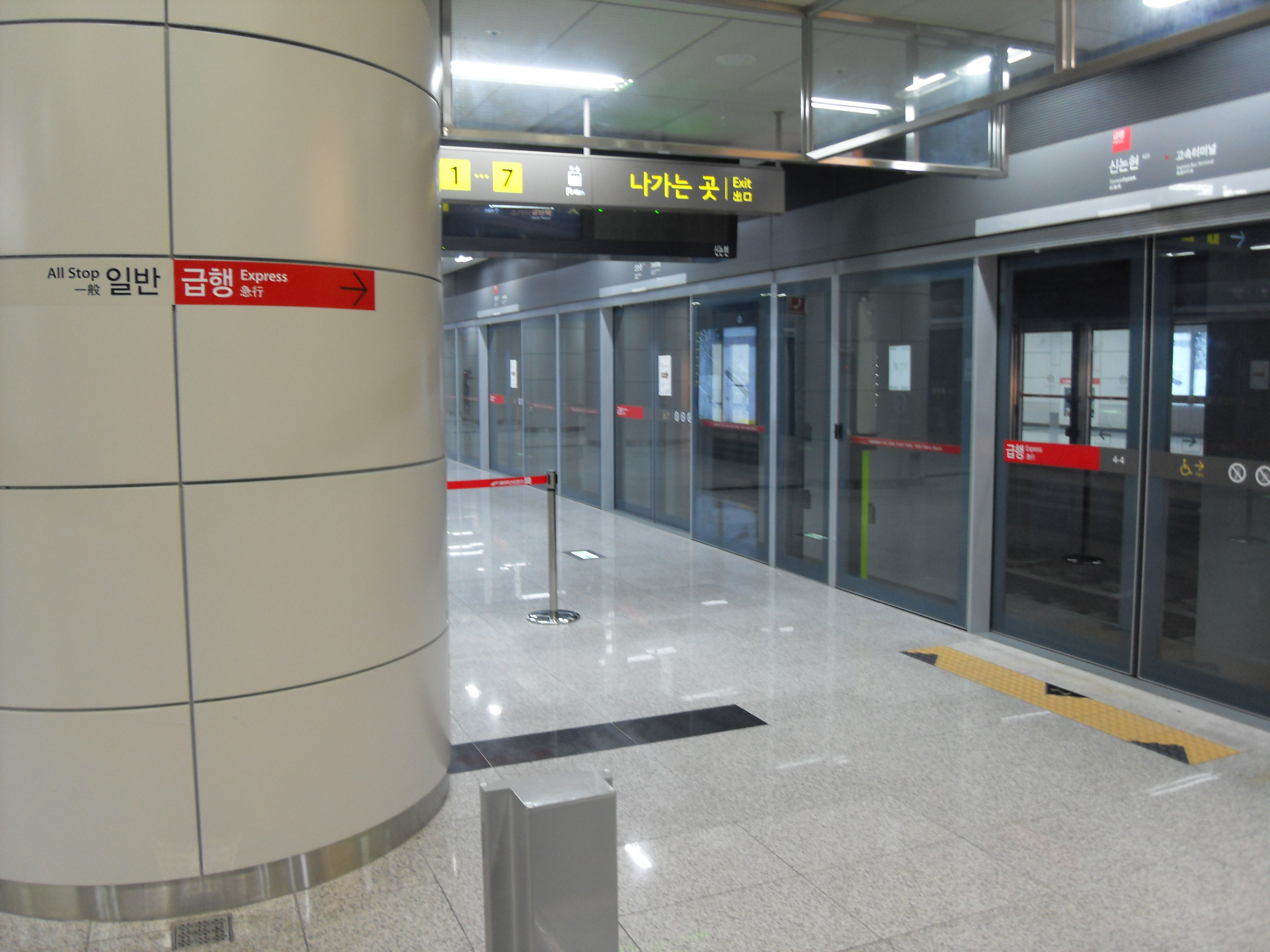
- Line 9 platform

Korean name
- Hangul: 신논현역
- Hanja: 新論峴驛
- Revised Romanization: Sinnonhyeon-yeok
- McCune–Reischauer: Sinnonhyŏn-yŏk

General information
- Location: 800 Nonhyeon-dong; Gangnam-gu, Seoul
- Operator: Seoul Metro Line 9 Corporation; New Seoul Railroad Co., Ltd.
- Lines: Line 9 Shinbundang Line
- Platforms: 4
- Tracks: 6

Construction
- Structure type: Underground

History
- Opened: July 24, 2009

Key dates
- May 28, 2022: Shinbundang Line opened

Services
Preceding station	Seoul Metropolitan Subway	Following station
Sapyeong towards Gaehwa	Line 9	Eonju towards VHS Medical Center
Express Bus Terminal towards Gimpo International Airport	Line 9 Express	Seonjeongneung towards VHS Medical Center
Nonhyeon towards Sinsa	Shinbundang Line	Gangnam towards Gwanggyo
Location

Sinnonhyeon Station is a railway station on Line 9 and the Shinbundang Line of the Seoul Metropolitan Subway, located by the Kyobo Tower sageori in Seocho District and Nonhyeon-dong, Gangnam District, Seoul. It was the southern terminus of Line 9 from 2009 to March 2015, when the line was extended to Sports Complex station. Gangnam Station and Nonhyeon Station are near here. It became a transfer station to the Shinbundang Line on May 28, 2022.

The section of Gangnam Boulevard from exit No.5 of this station to exit No.2 of Gangnam Station of Line 2 is designated as a smoke-free zone by the Gangnam District office.

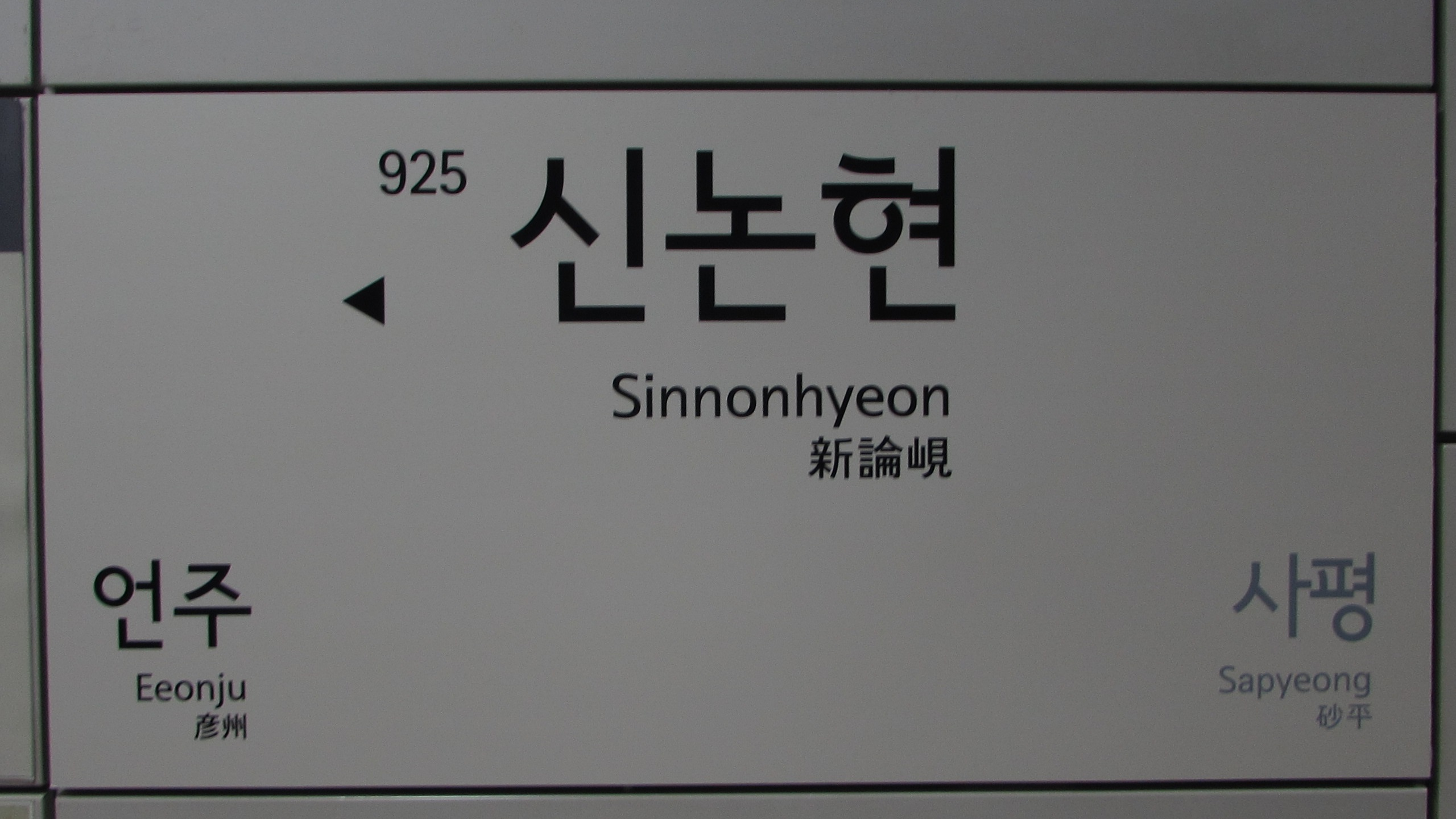
Line 9 station sign

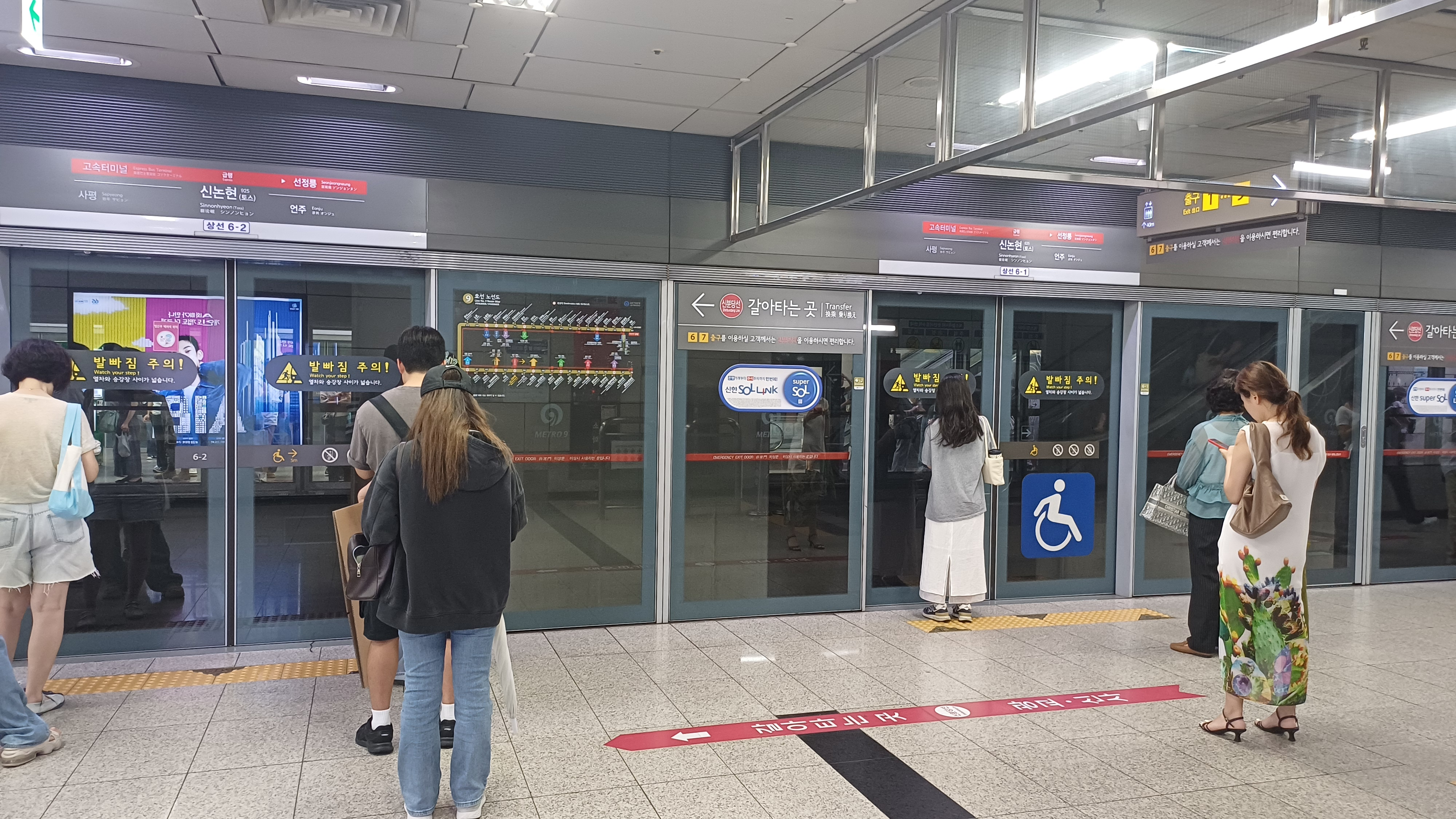
Line 9 platform

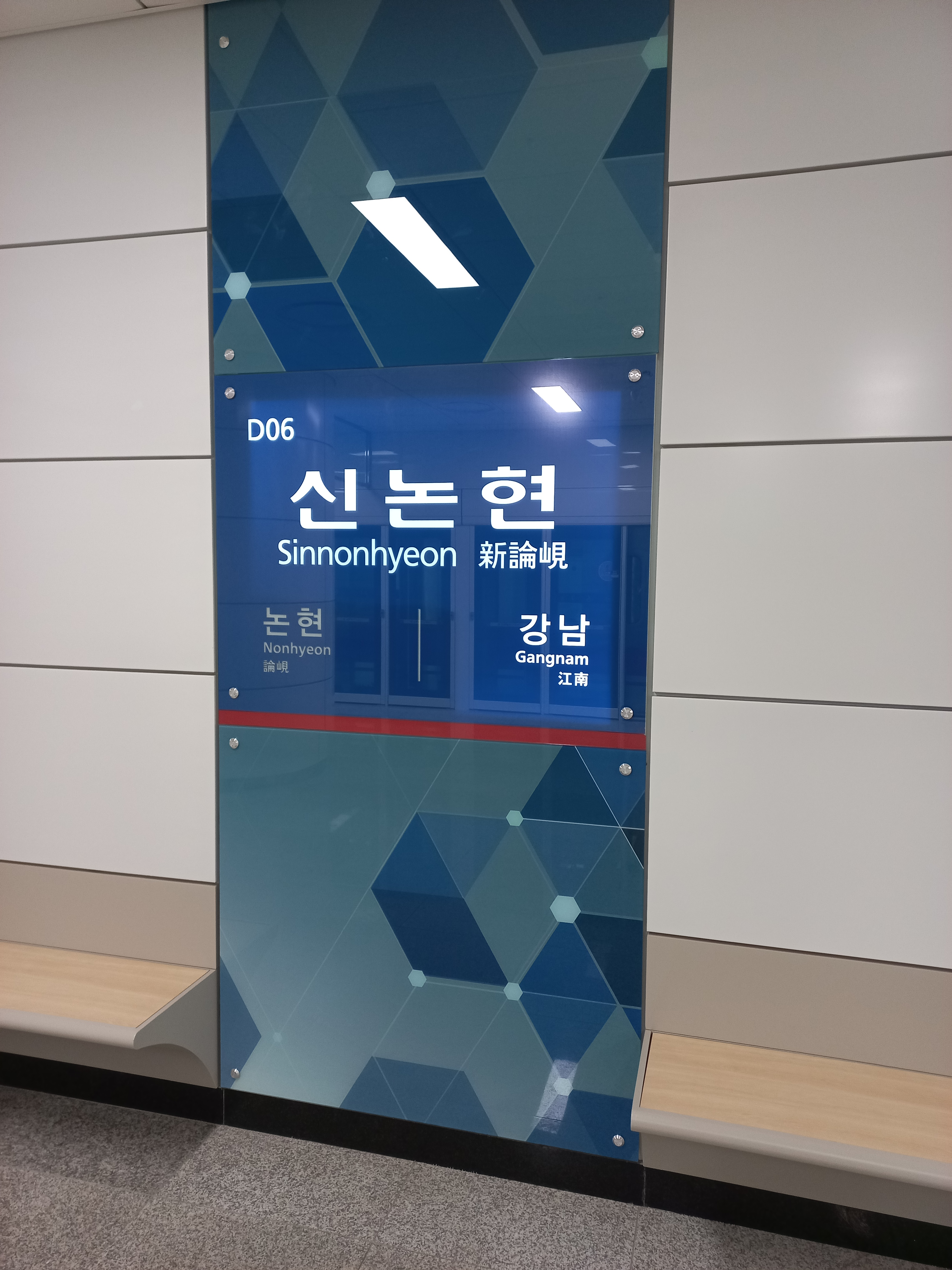
Shinbundang Line station sign

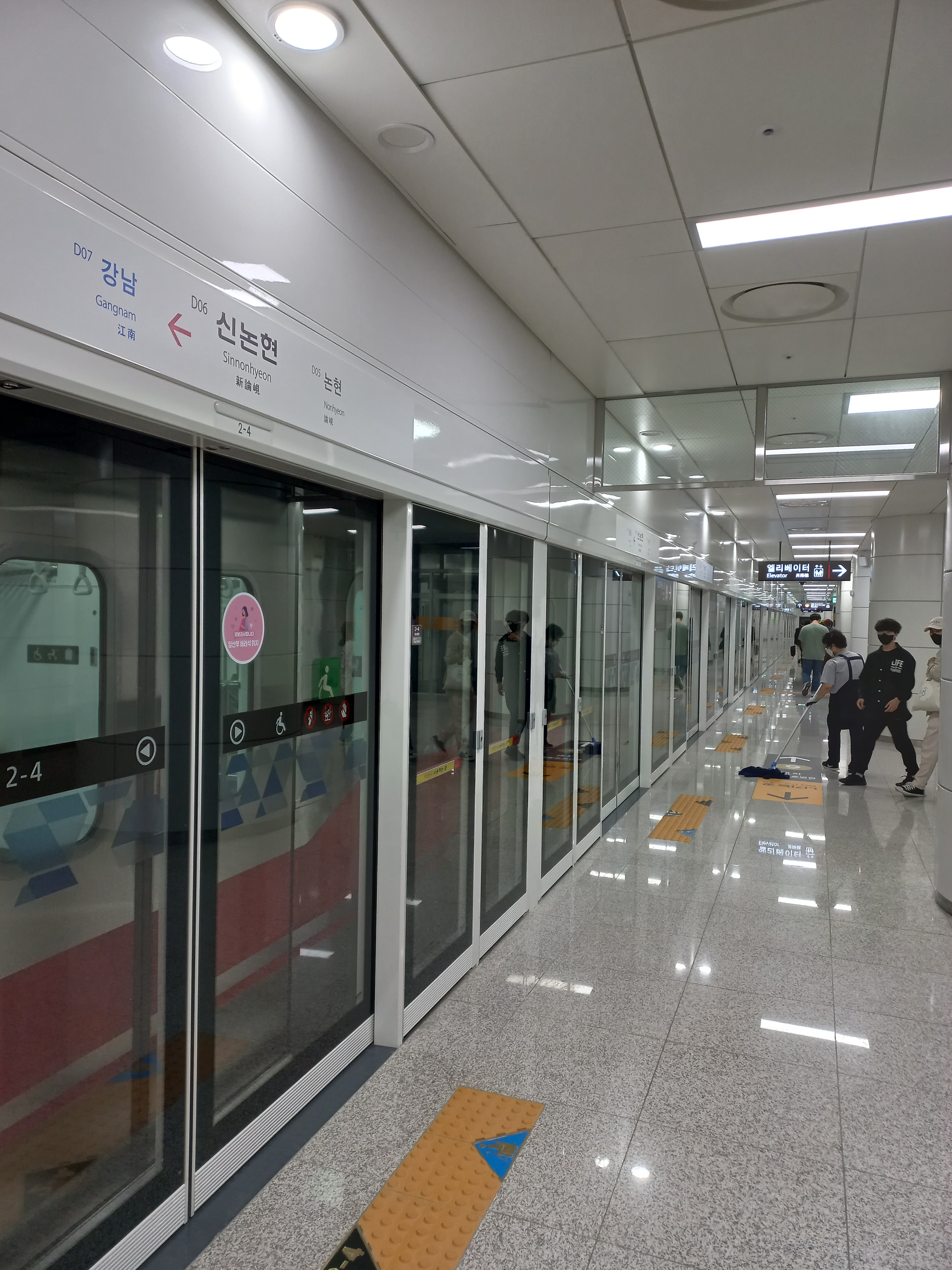
Shinbundang Line platform

== Station layout ==
Express Bus Terminal (express) ↑
Sapyeong (local) ↑
S/B | | N/B |
↓ Seonjeongneung (express)
↓ Eonju (local)

Northbound Local	← ● Line 9 toward Gaehwa
Northbound Express	← ● Line 9 toward Gimpo Int'l Airport
Southbound Local	● Line 9 toward VHS Medical Center →
Southbound Express	● Line 9 toward VHS Medical Center →
