= Seocho District =

District of Seoul, South Korea

Seocho
- Autonomous District
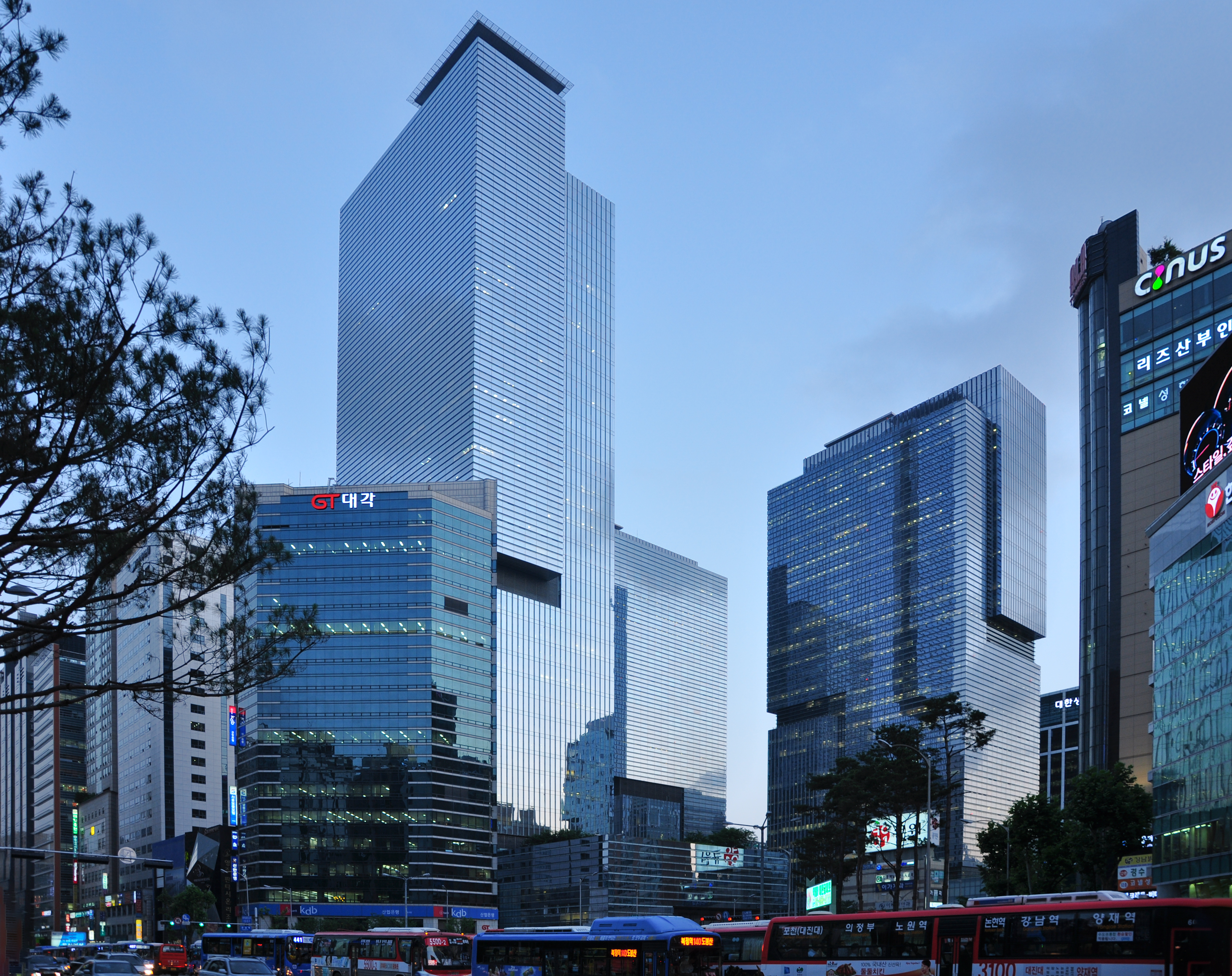
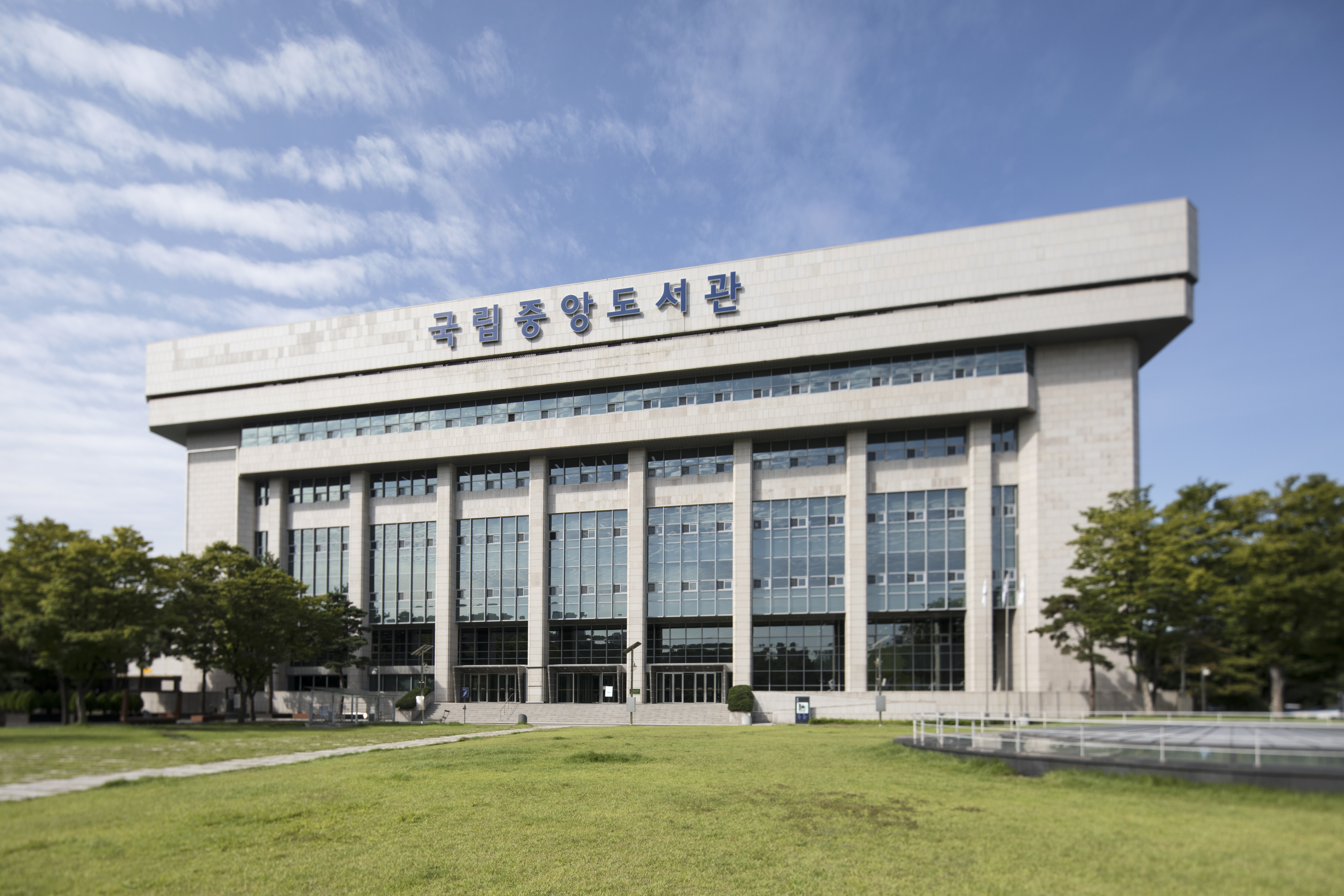
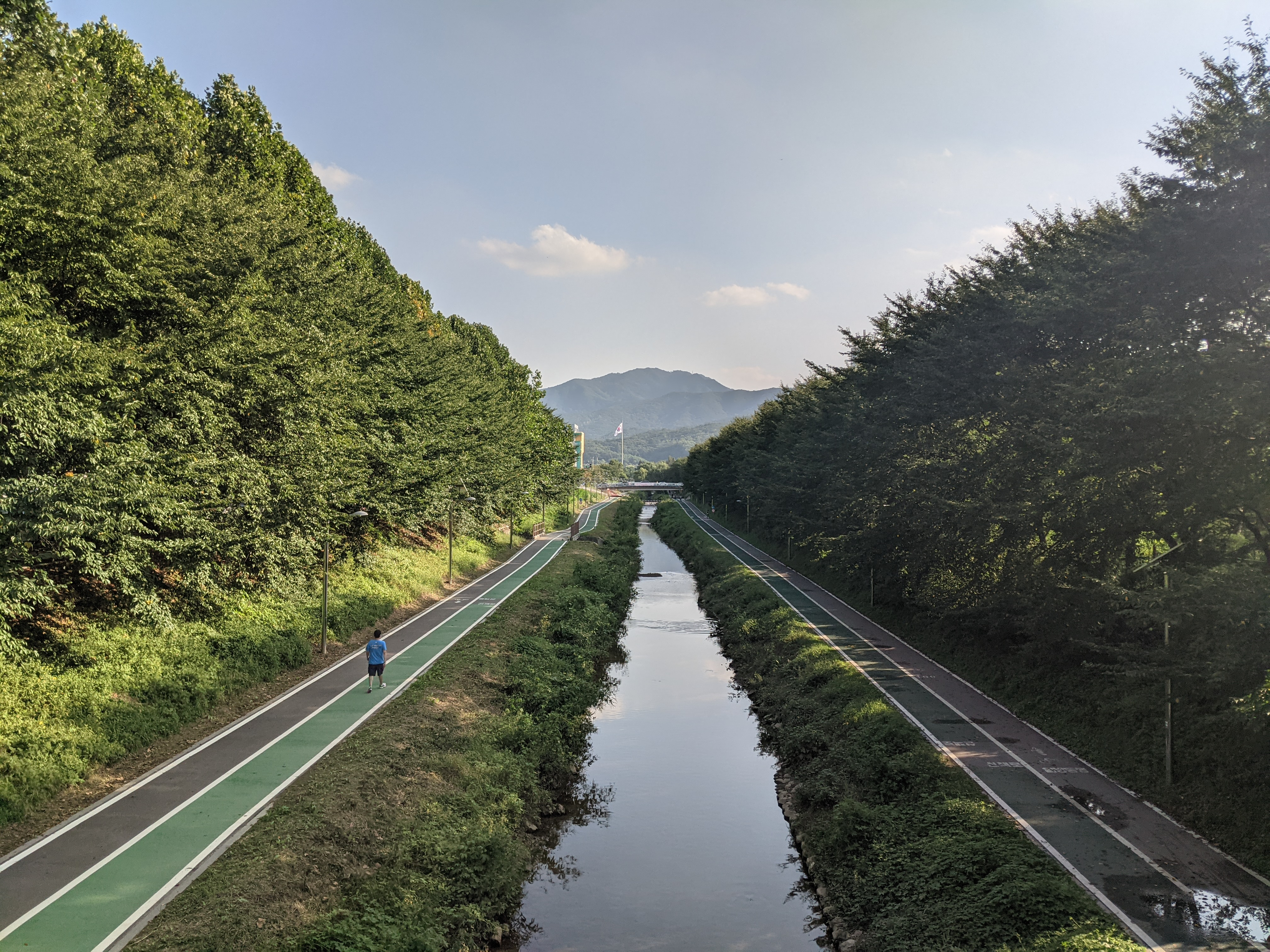
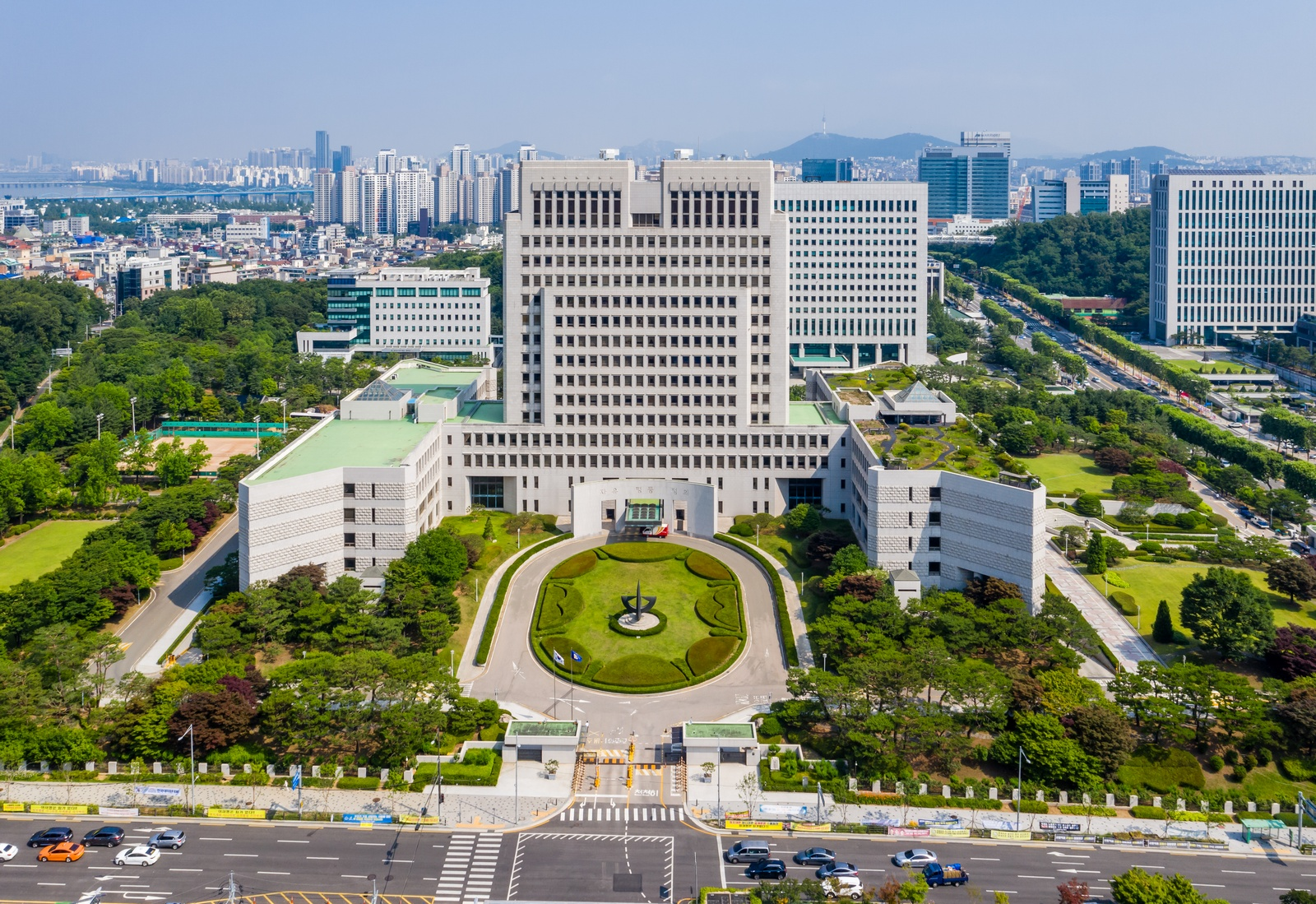
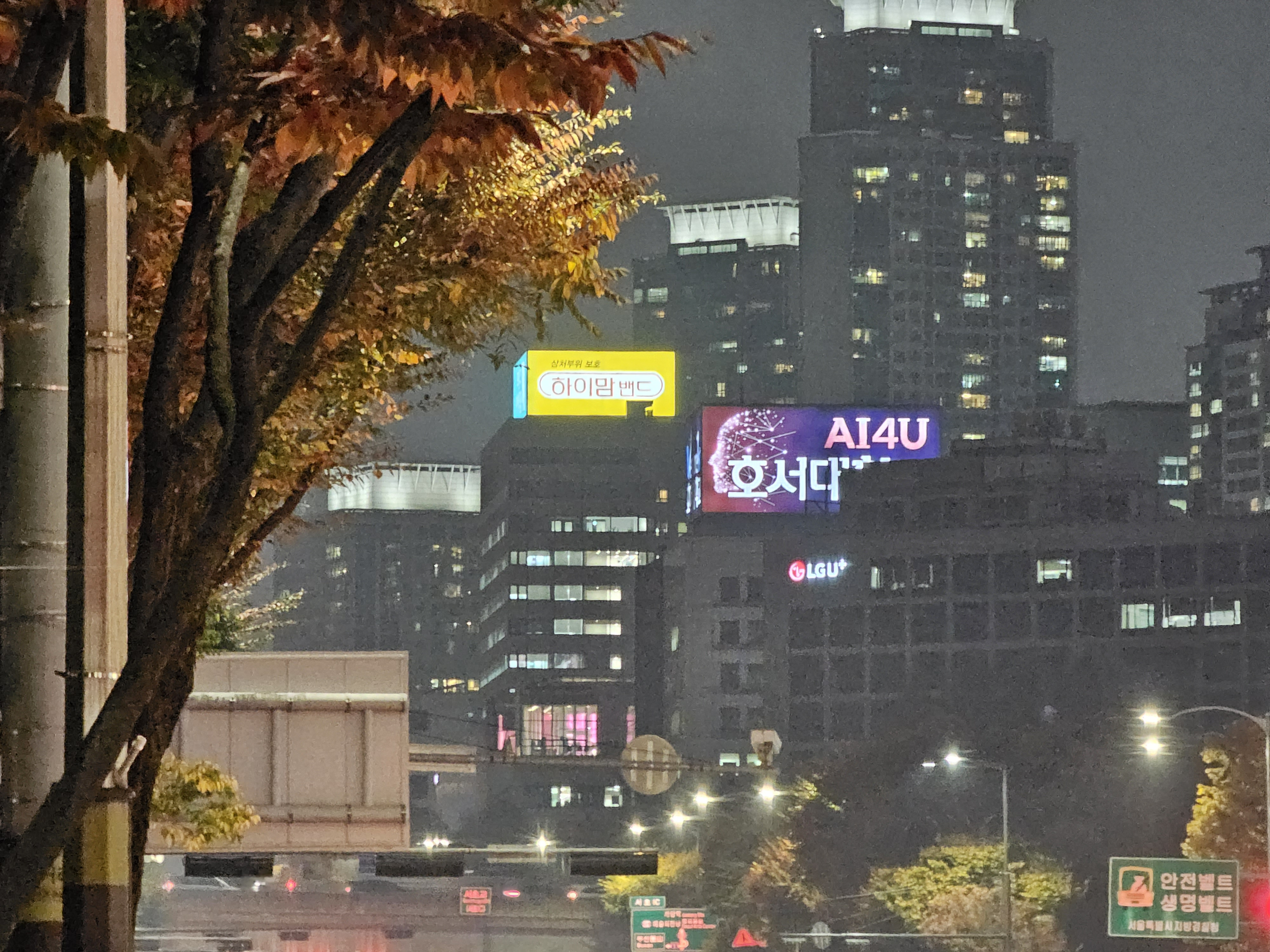
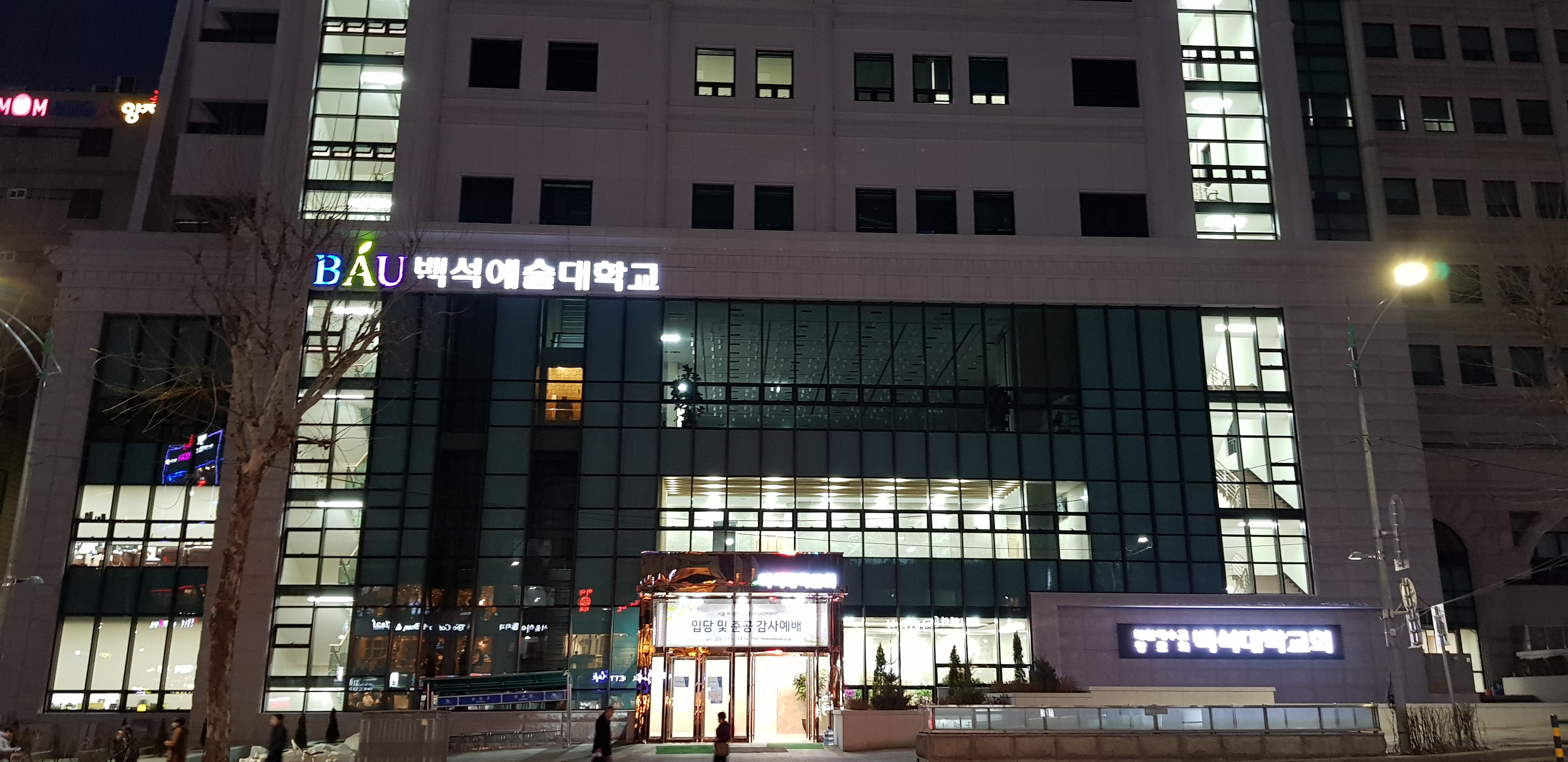
- Samsung Town, also known as the Main headquarters for Samsung Group. National Library of Korea Yangjae Citizen's Forest Supreme Court of Korea Nambu Beltway near Yangjae Station Baekseok Arts University

- Flag

- Location of Seocho District in Seoul
- Coordinates: 37°29′01″N 127°01′57″E
- Country: South Korea
- Region: Sudogwon
- Special City: Seoul
- Administrative dong: 18

Government
  - Body: Seochu-gu Council
  - Mayor: Jeon Seong-soo (People Power)
  - MNAs: List of MNAs: Cho Eun-hee (People Power); Park Sung-joong (People Power)

Area
  - Total: 46.92 km^{2} (18.12 sq mi)

Population (2025)
  - Total: 409,387
  - Density: 8,725/km^{2} (22,600/sq mi)
- Time zone: UTC+9 (Korea Standard Time)
- Postal code: 06500 – 06899
- Area code(s): +82-2-500(02 inside Korea)
- Website: Seocho District official website

Korean name
- Hangul: 서초구
- Hanja: 瑞草區
- RR: Seocho-gu
- MR: Sŏch'o-gu

Seocho District (Korean: 서초구) is one of the 25 districts which make up the city of Seoul, South Korea. Seocho is a part of the Gangnam region, along with the Gangnam and Songpa districts. (Note: Koo, Hagen (15 July 2022). Privilege and Anxiety: The Korean Middle Class in the Global Era. Ithaca, New York: Cornell University Press. doi:10.7591/cornell/9781501764912.001.0001. ISBN 978-1-5017-6492-9. OCLC 1295620078.: "Although not every area of Gangnam is affluent, its three core districts (Gangnamgu, Seochogu, and Songpagu) are definitely middle or upper middle class in terms of the residents’ economic status."; Jin, Min-ji (11 February 2023). "How did Gangnam become the Seoul epicenter it is today?". Korea JoongAng Daily. 중앙일보. Archived from the original on 26 February 2023.: "The term Gangnam technically means south of the river, and refers to three districts in Seoul below the Han River: Gangnam, Seocho and Songpa."; Yang, Myungji (7 February 2018). "The rise of 'Gangnam style': Manufacturing the urban middle class in Seoul, 1976–1996". Urban Studies. 55 (15). SAGE Publishing: 3404–3420. doi:10.1177/0042098017748092. ISSN 0042-0980. JSTOR 26533030. S2CID 158677717.: "While Gangnam can be defined in different ways – from the narrowest, limited to just the administrative district of Gangnam-gu itself, to the broadest, which would encompass the whole area south of the Han River– I follow the conventional and common definition of Gangnam as an area composed of the three administrative units of Gangnam-gu, Seocho-gu, and Songpa-gu.") Seocho District ranks as one of the richest neighborhoods in South Korea and among the most expensive areas in Seoul with an average sales price of 47.75 million South Korean won per 3.3 square meters. Many of the wealthiest residents are concentrated in the two Gangnam districts including Seocho, known as Gangnam School District Eight (강남 8학군).

Seocho District was established by Gangnam District in 1988, yet remains significantly connected to Gangnam and it is itself in terms of administration, geography, society, and economics. The name 'Seocho District' itself is derived from Seocho-dong, where Gangnam station is located, which was originally under Gangnam District's jurisdiction. Consequently, the term 'Gangnam' is essentially shared between Gangnam District and Seocho District. Key commercial areas of the Gangnam downtown district, particularly around major subway stations such as Sinsa Station, Nonhyeon Station, and Sinnonhyeon Station, are physically indistinct from Gangnam District and are entirely managed by Seocho District. Seocho District is served by the Seoul Subway Line 2, Line 3, Line 4, Line 7, Line 9, and Shinbundang Line. South Korea's longest highway, Gyeongbu Expressway, also ends in Seocho. The most crowded area in Korea, Gangnam-daero Gangnam station, is located in this district.

== History ==
Seocho District was once the capital of the Baekje Kingdom which existed between 18 BC and 660 AD. At the time, the area was named Wiryesong (Fortress Castle) and was located in the western area of present-day Seocho-gu. Located next to the Han River, the area which present Seocho-gu currently occupies is sometimes considered the cradle of Korean civilization, having been inhabited since prehistoric times.

Development of the area first began in 1965 with plans to turn the land into a secondary hub of the metropolis. Over the course of 20 years, the area was transformed from its rural beginnings into an urban center with a population of around 400,000. Seocho District was officially established in January 1988, separating from the Gangnam District jurisdiction.

== Geography ==
- Umyeonsan (mountain)
- Guryongsan (mountain)
- Cheonggyesan (mountain)
- Yangjaecheon (stream)

== Economy ==
=== Legal district ===
According to the Korean Bar Association, more than one third of the practicing attorneys in Seoul work out of Seocho-dong, a southern neighborhood in Seocho District. Sometimes referred to as "Seocho Judicial Town," the area is also home to many of the country's most important legal institutions, including the Supreme Court, the Supreme Public Prosecutors' Office, the Seoul Central District Court, and the Seoul Metropolitan Police Agency. The area also includes the headquarters of some of the world's largest companies which compose the clientele for many attorneys.

=== Notable firms ===
Several of the world's largest companies have their headquarters located in this district. Samsung, the country's largest conglomerate, has many of its important buildings in the area in an office park called Samsung Town. Hyundai Motor Group, which as of 2022 is the 11th largest automobile manufacturer in the world, is also headquartered in the district.

=== Income ===
Due to the high concentration of residents with specialty occupations in Seocho District, the area is known to be one of the wealthiest neighborhoods in Seoul. In 2021, the average monthly income for residents in Seocho District was 3,770,000 KRW; this figure is only second to Gangnam District–at the district level–and is higher than the city of Seoul's average monthly income of 2,980,000 KRW.

== Administration ==
Administrative divisions

In South Korea, there are two types of dong or neighborhoods, one of which is called Beopjeong-dong (법정동 法定洞) denoting "dong designated by law." The other is called Haengjeong-dong (행정동 行政洞) referring to "dong assigned for administrative purpose." As the population of residents in a beopjeong-dong increases or decreases, the administration in charge divides the dong into several haengjeong-dong, or integrates several beopjeong-dong into one haengjeong-dong.

Neighborhood

- Seocho-dong (Seocho 1~4 dong)(서초동 瑞草洞)
- Jamwon-dong (잠원동 蠶院洞)
- Banpo-dong (Banpo Bon (Basically 0)~4 dong)(반포동 盤浦洞)
- Bangbae-dong (Bangbae Bon (Basically 0)~4 dong) (방배동 方背洞)
- Yangjae-dong (Yangjae 1~2 dong (양재동 良才洞)
  - Umyeon-dong (우면동 牛眠洞)
  - Wonji-dong (원지동 院趾洞)
- Naegok-dong (내곡동 內谷洞)
  - Yeomgok-dong (염곡동 廉谷洞)
  - Sinwon-dong (신원동 新院洞)

== Transportation ==
=== Railroad ===
- Seoul Metro

- Seoul Subway Line 2 Circle Line

(Gangnam-gu) ← Seoul National Univ. of Education – Seocho – Bangbae → (Dongjak-gu)

- Seoul Subway Line 3

(Gangnam-gu) ← Jamwon – Express Bus Terminal – Seoul National Univ. of Education – Nambu Bus Terminal – Yangjae (Seocho-gu Office) → (Gangnam-gu)

- Seoul Metropolitan Rapid Transit Corporation

- Seoul Subway Line 7

(Gangnam-gu) ← Banpo – Express Bus Terminal – Naebang → (Dongjak-gu)

- Seoul Metro Line 9 Corporation

- Seoul Subway Line 9

(Dongjak-gu) ← Gubanpo – Sinbanpo – Express Bus Terminal – Sapyeong → (Gangnam-gu)

- Shinbundang Railroad Company

- Shinbundang Line

Gangnam – Yangjae – Yangjae Citizen's Forest (Maeheon) – Cheonggyesan → (Bundang-gu)

== Education ==
=== Gangnam 8 District ===
Gangnam School District 8 is a school district (administered by the Seoul Metropolitan Office of Education) that encompasses the Seocho and Gangnam districts of Seoul. The district is known for its high-quality education and features some of Korea's most elite and competitive high schools such as Whimoon and Kyunggi high school. Graduating classes from high schools in Gangnam School District 8 boast high admission rates to Korea's top universities. Seoul National University's freshman class in 2022 had 10% of its students come from schools in Gangnam School District 8.

Torch Trinity Graduate University is located in Yangjae-dong, Seocho District.

International schools in the district:

- French School of Seoul
- Dulwich College Seoul

=== Libraries ===
The district has a large public library system with 21 public libraries. In addition to libraries, Seocho District is home to 24 elementary schools, 15 middle schools, 11 high schools, 1 school for the disabled, and 2 universities.

== Tourism ==
The district is referred to as the "City of Corporation and IT" and is home to many restaurants, hotels, and cafes.

=== Seoul Arts Center ===
The Seoul Arts Center is located in Seocho District, Seoul. The arts center includes five main buildings: the Opera House, the Music Hall, the Hangaram Art Museum, the Hangaram Design Museum, and the Seoul Calligraphy Art Museum.

The Music Hall and Seoul Calligraphy Museum were built in 1988. The Hangaram Art Museum and Art Archives were completed in 1990, and the Opera House was built and opened to the public in 1993. The arts center attracts nearly 3 million annual visitors.

=== National Library of Korea ===
The National Library of Korea was established in 1945 and is located in Seoul. The library contains over 10 million volumes and numerous foreign books.

=== National Gugak Center ===
The National Gugak Center, located in Bangbae 3-dong of Seocho District, was founded in 1951 with the purpose of preserving Korean court and folk music. The institute aims to promote traditional Korean music by hosting and engaging in workshops, research, and live performances.

=== Other attractions ===
- Sebitseom
- Banpo Bridge
- Supreme Court of Korea
- Citizen Park
- Heonilleung (Royal Tombs of the Joseon Dynasty)

== Notable events ==
=== Collapse of Sampoong Department Store ===
Sampoong Department Store, constructed in the Seocho-dong area of the district, collapsed on June 29, 1995, due to structural failures and regulatory negligence. The disaster resulted in 502 deaths and over 900 injuries. The collapse of the Sampoong Department Store is only second to the Rana Plaza factory collapse in Bangladesh in terms of casualties caused by unintended building collapses. Executives responsible for the construction of the Sampoong Department Store– namely Lee Joon who was the chairman of Sampoong Group's construction division– were later convicted for criminal negligence.

=== Woomyeon Mountain avalanche ===
Woomyeon Mountain is a mountain terrain that stretches along the borders of the Seocho, Bangbae, Yangjae, and Woomyeon neighborhoods of Seocho District. In 2011, unprecedented levels of rain in greater Seoul– over 587 mm in just 3 days– triggered an avalanche in Woomyeon mountain. The disaster heavily impacted the Hyeongchon Village neighborhood of Seocho District, resulting in over 17 deaths and 50 injuries.

=== Gangnam station flood ===
On August 8, 2022, Seoul experienced one of its heaviest rainfalls of the last century. The greater Seoul area experienced over 381.5 mm of precipitation– beating the single-day precipitation record of 354.7 mm in 1920. One of the most impacted areas was Gangnam station in Seocho District; a total of 3 casualties occurred in this area with 2 people being sucked into a sinkhole and the other drowning inside a lower level parking lot.

== Notable areas ==
=== Seorae Village ===
Seorae Village, commonly referred to as the French district or "Little France", is an enclave located in Banpo 4-dong of Seocho district. In the 1980s, with the construction of high-end, luxury residential villas, Seorae Village emerged as an affluent, residential neighborhood. Additionally, with the French Embassy School in Korea (Lycée français de Séoul) moving from Yongsan District to Seocho District in 1985, the French population in Seorae Village steadily grew. The number of French residents residing in Seorae Village was further increased by French corporations– such as Carrefour, TGV, CLSA, and Bank of Renault– entering the Korean market in the 1990s. Today, approximately 40% of the French population living in Korea reside in Seorae Village.

=== Gangnam station ===
Gangnam station is one of the most crowded places in Korea and a common meeting ground for young people. After the release of PSY's hit song, "Gangnam Style", it also became a major tourist attraction. The station has a variety of outlets including restaurants, theaters, record stores, beauty salons, and massage specialists. It serves as an important hub for transportation and is interconnected with the bus system.

=== Acrovista ===
Acrovista is a famous Mixed-use building located in Seocho-gu. It was built on the site after the collapse of Sampoong Department Store. It is mostly inhabited by legal professionals such as judges, lawyers, and prosecutors. Yoon Suk Yeol, the 20th president of Korea, also lived here.

== Sister cities ==
=== International ===
- Suginami, Tokyo, Japan
- Hongkou District, Shanghai, China
- Laoshan District, Qingdao, China
- Çankaya District, Ankara, Turkey
- Perth, Western Australia, Perth, Australia
- Irvine, California, United States
- Cuauhtémoc, Mexico City, Mexico

=== Domestic ===
- (South Korea) Cheongyang
- (South Korea) Haenam
- (South Korea) Hoengseong
- (South Korea) Hwacheon
- (South Korea) Icheon
- (South Korea) Jecheon
- (South Korea) Nam District, Ulsan
- (South Korea) Namwon
- (South Korea) Nonsan
- (South Korea) Sancheong
- (South Korea) Seocheon
- (South Korea) Taean
- (South Korea) Yesan

== Notable people from Seocho District ==
- Bom Kim, founder and CEO of Coupang.
- Lee Se-young, actress
- Jaehyun, member of the K-pop boy band NCT and its sub-units NCT 127 and NCT DoJaeJung
- Lee Da-in, actress
- Namjoo, member of girlgroup Apink
- Youngjae, former member of boygroup B.A.P
- Eunbin, member of girlgroup CLC
- Koo Jung Mo, member of boygroup Cravity
- Park Soobin, member of girlgroup WJSN
- Koo Jun-yup, member of CLON
- Ko So-young, actress
- Kim Jin-pyo, singer
- Bae Sung-jae, former broadcaster from South Korea
- Sung Si-kyung, singer
- PSY, singer
- Lee Seo-jin, actor
- Lee Juck, singer
- Cha Tae-hyun, actor
- Ha Jung-woo, actor
- LEESEO, member of IVE
- Cho Seung-woo, actor
- SOYEON, member of T-ara
- Lee Ki-woo, actor

== See also ==
- Gangnam District
- Yongsan District
- Gwanak District
- Dongjak District
- Geography of South Korea
