= Ilsan Line =

Railway line in Gyeonggi, South Korea

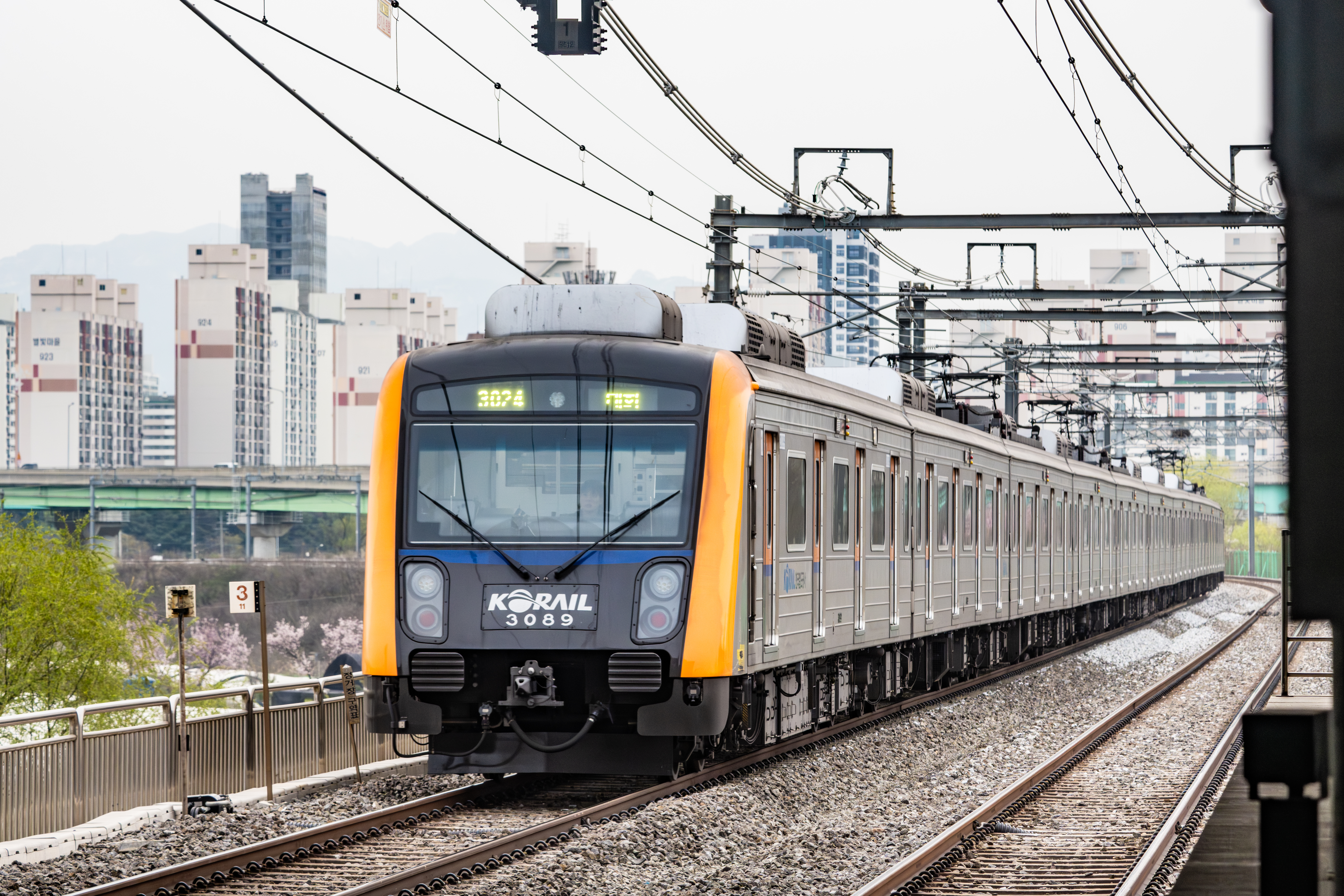
- Korail 3000 series second-generation train at Daegok Station

Overview
- Native name: 일산선(一山線)
- Status: Operational
- Owner: Korea Rail Network Authority
- Locale: Gyeonggi Province
- Termini: Daehwa; Jichuk
- Stations: 10

Service
- Type: Rapid transit
- Operator: Korail
- Depot: Jichuk

History
- Opened: January 30, 1996

Technical
- Line length: 19.2 km (11.9 mi)
- Number of tracks: Double track
- Track gauge: 1,435 mm (4 ft 8 1/2 in) standard gauge
- Electrification: 1,500 V DC Overhead lines

- Ilsan Line
- Hangul: 일산선
- Hanja: 一山線
- RR: Ilsanseon
- MR: Ilsansŏn

The Ilsan Line is a subway line operated by Korail, in Seoul, South Korea. Trains from this line continue to and from Seoul Metro's Line 3.

== History ==
The line started construction on March 15, 1991 as an extension of Seoul Metro Line 3 with the line opening in 1996. After the completion of the Ilsan Line, the Korean National Railroad suddenly announced that it would transfer ownership of the line to Seoul Metropolitan Government. According to the Korea National Railway, the Seoul Metropolitan Government asked the Seoul Metropolitan Subway to take over the operation of the Ilsan Line, which is connected to the Seoul Subway Line 3, noting that redundant management facilities and workforce would be needed if Korean National Railroad operates the Ilsan Line. The Seoul Metropolitan Government dismissed the request because the Ilsan Line was located in Gyeonggi Province, and was concerned the increased expenditure should Seoul Metropolitan Subway operate the line. Ultimately, the Ilsan Line remained under the jurisdiction of the Korean National Railroad which became what is today Korail. On December 27, 2014 Wonheung station started operation.

== Stations ==
Station; Number	Station Name; English	Station Name; Hangul	Transfer	Location	
↑ Through-service to/from Ogeum via Seoul Metropolitan Subway Line 3 ↑
319	Jichuk	지축		Deogyang-gu	Goyang, Gyeonggi
318	Samsong	삼송		Deogyang-gu	Goyang, Gyeonggi
317	Wonheung	원흥		Deogyang-gu	Goyang, Gyeonggi
316	Wondang	원당		Deogyang-gu	Goyang, Gyeonggi
315	Hwajeong	화정		Deogyang-gu	Goyang, Gyeonggi
314	Daegok	대곡	Gyeongui–Jungang Line Seohae Line Great Train eXpress	Deogyang-gu	Goyang, Gyeonggi
313	Baekseok	백석		Ilsandong-gu	Goyang, Gyeonggi
312	Madu	마두		Ilsandong-gu	Goyang, Gyeonggi
311	Jeongbalsan	정발산		Ilsandong-gu	Goyang, Gyeonggi
310	Juyeop	주엽		Ilsanseo-gu	Goyang, Gyeonggi
309	Daehwa	대화		Ilsanseo-gu	Goyang, Gyeonggi

== Rolling stock ==
For the opening of the Ilsan Line, Korea National Railway procured a fleet of 18 first-generation Korail 3000 series trainsets from Hyundai Precision & Industries, delivered from 1995–1997. A fleet of eight second-generation Korail 3000 series trainsets are currently being manufactured by Hyundai Rotem, and another eight third-generation Korail 3000 series trainsets will be manufactured by Woojin Industrial Systems, both to eventually replace the first-generation trains. All Ilsan Line trains operated by Korail are stored and maintained at Jichuk Depot located near Jichuk Station.

== Ilsan Line History ==
- March 15, 1991: Construction began
- November 24, 1995: The opening schedule was delayed by two months due to a collision accident with an Ilsan Line train during a test run
- January 30, 1996: Direct operation with Seoul Subway Line 3 began along with the opening
- April 1, 2000: The name was integrated into Seoul Subway Line 3 and Seoul Metropolitan Subway Line 3
- July 12, 2006: Operations were suspended throughout the entire line due to flooding of the underground section caused by heavy rain
- July 1, 2009: Transfer at Daegok Station opened along with the opening of the Seoul Metropolitan Subway Gyeongui Line
- December 27, 2014: Wonheung Station opened for business
- April 17, 2019: Changed to 319 due to a change in the railway line number
- 2022 February~March: Temporary trains are organized on the KTCS-M Daehwa-Samsong section and are operated for commercial purposes (09:00~12:30 hours).

== See also ==
- Subways in South Korea
- Seoul Subway Line 3
