= Rapid transit in South Korea =

South Korean rapid transit logo

The cities of South Korea with rapid transit system.
- Seoul Capital Area - 22 lines
- Busan - 6 lines
- Daegu - 4 lines
- Daejeon - 1 line
- Gwangju - 1 line

Rapid transit systems operate in six major South Korean cities.

== Currently operational ==
Rapid transit systems
System	Locale	Lines	Stations	Length (km)	Commencement
Seoul Subway (inc. Incheon Subway)	Seoul Capital Area	24	777	1,386.4	15 August 1974
Busan Metro	Busan–Gyeongnam Area	6	158	205.6	19 July 1985
Daegu Metro	Daegu–Gyeongbuk Area	4	101	153.7	26 November 1997
Gwangju Metro	Gwangju	1	20	20.6	28 April 2004
Daejeon Metro	Daejeon	1	22	22.7	16 March 2006

=== Seoul capital area ===
- Metropolitan Rail
  - Korail operates the following commuter lines: Bundang Line, Gyeongchun Line, Gyeongui–Jungang Line, Suin Line, Gyeonggang Line, and parts of metro lines Line 1, Line 3, Line 4.
  - Korail Airport Railroad operates AREX
  - NeoTrans operates Shinbundang Line
  - E-Rail operates Seohae Line
- Urban Rail
  - Seoul Metro operates Line 2, Line 5, Line 6, Line 7, Line 8, and parts of lines Line 1, Line 3, Line 4, and Line 9 Second Extension.
  - Seoul Metro Line9 (a joint venture between Veolia Transport and Hyundai Rotem) operates Line 9 First Extension
  - Incheon Transit operates the whole Incheon subway system (I1 & I2), as well as sections of Seoul Subway Line 7.
- Light Metro Rail
  - Uijeongbu Light Rail operates U Line
  - Yongin Rapid Transit operates EverLine
  - UI trans operates Ui LRT

Rapid transit lines in Seoul National Capital Area
Operator	Livery	Line	Stations	Length (km)	Terminuses	Commencement
Seoul Metro		Seoul Subway Line 1	10	7.8	Seoul–Cheongnyangni	15 August 1974
Seoul Metro		Seoul Subway Line 2	51	60.2	Main: loop line; Branches: Seongsu–Sinseol-dong, Sindorim–Kkachisan	31 October 1980
Seoul Metro		Seoul Subway Line 3	34	38.2	Jichuk–Ogeum	12 July 1985
Seoul Metro		Seoul Subway Line 4	26	31.1	Danggogae–Namtaeryeong	20 April 1985
Seoul Metro		Seoul Subway Line 5	51	52.3	Main: Banghwa–Sangil-dong; Branch: Gangdong–Macheon	15 November 1995
Seoul Metro		Seoul Subway Line 6	38	35.1	Eungam–Sinnae	7 August 2000
Seoul Metro and Incheon Transit Corporation		Seoul Subway Line 7	51	57.1	Jangam–Seongnam	11 October 1996
Seoul Metro		Seoul Subway Line 8	17	17.7	Amsa–Moran	23 November 1996
Seoul Metro Line9 & Seoul Metro		Seoul Subway Line 9	38	40.6	Gaehwa–VHS Medical Center	24 July 2009
Ui-Sinseol Trans		Ui LRT	15	11.1	Bukhansan Ui(Doseonsa)–Sinseol-dong	1 July 2012
South-Seoul LRT		Sillim Line	11	7.8	Saetgang–Gwanaksan	28 May 2022
NeoTrans Co. Ltd.		Shinbundang Line	16	33.4	Sinsa–Gwanggyo	28 October 2011
Yongin Rapid Transit		Everline	15	18.1	Giheung–Jeondae–Everland	26 April 2013
Uijeongbu Light Rail Transit		U Line	15	11.1	Balgok–Tapseok	1 July 2012
Airport Railroad		AREX	13	63.8	Seoul–Incheon International Airport Terminal 2	23 March 2007
Korail	Seoul Subway Line 1	Seoul Subway Line 1 Gyeongin Line; Byeongjeom Depot Line section of Gyeongwon Line section of Gyeongbu Line section of Janghang Line section of Gyeongbu High Speed Railway	93	211.1	Main: Yeoncheon–Cheongnyangni, Seoul Station–Incheon; Branches: Guro–Sinchang, Geumcheon-gu Office–Gwangmyeong, Byeongjeom–Seodongtan	15 August 1974
Korail	Seoul Subway Line 3	Seoul Subway Line 3 Ilsan Line	10	19.2	Daehwa–Jichuk	30 January 1996
Korail	Seoul Subway Line 4	Seoul Subway Line 4 Gwacheon Line; Ansan Line	23	39.4	Namtaeryeong–Oido	15 January 1993
Korail	Gyeongui–Jungang Line	Gyeongui–Jungang Line; Yongsan Line section of Gyeongwon Line	55	121.7	Main: Yongmun–Munsan; Branch: Seoul–Gajwa	16 December 2005 (Jungang Line); 1 July 2009 (Gyeongui Line)
Korail	Gyeongchun Line	Gyeongchun Line; Mangu Line	24	81.3	Sangbong–Chuncheon	21 December 2010
Korail		Suin-Bundang Line	63	104.5	Cheongnyangni–Incheon	12 September 2020
Korail		Gyeonggang Line	11	54.8	Pangyo–Yeoju	24 September 2016
E-Rail		Seohae Line	21	47	Ilsan–Wonsi	16 June 2018
Incheon Subway	Incheon Subway Line 1	Incheon Subway Line 1	29	29.4	Gyeyang–International Business District	6 October 1999
Incheon Subway	Incheon Subway Line 2	Incheon Subway Line 2	27	29.1	Geomdan Oryu–Unyeon	30 July 2016

=== Busan–Ulsan–Gyeongnam area ===
- Metropolitan Rail
  - Korail operates the following commuter line: Donghae
- Urban Rail
  - Busan Transportation operates lines 1, 2, 3, and 4
- Light Metro Rail
  - B&G Metro operates the Busan–Gimhae light rail

Rapid transit lines in Busan
Operator	Livery	Line	Stations	Length (km)	Terminuses	Commencement
Busan Transportation Corp.		Busan Metro Line 1	40	40.5	Dadaepo Beach–Nopo	19 July 1985
Busan Transportation Corp.		Busan Metro Line 2	42	45.2	Jangsan–Yangsan	30 June 1999
Busan Transportation Corp.		Busan Metro Line 3	17	18.3	Suyeong–Daejeo	28 November 2005
Busan Transportation Corp.		Busan Metro Line 4	14	12.7	Minam–Anpyeong	30 March 2011
B&G Metro		Busan–Gimhae Light Rail Transit	21	23.4	Sasang–Kaya University	9 September 2011
Korail		Donghae Line	23	65.7	Bujeon–Taehwagang	30 December 2016

=== Daegu–Gyeongbuk area ===
- Daegu Metropolitan Transit operates the whole subway system.

Rapid transit lines in Daegu
Operator	Livery	Line	Stations	Length (km)	Terminuses	Commencement
Daegu Metropolitan Transit		Daegu Metro Line 1	35	37.3	Seolhwa-Myeonggok–Hayang	26 November 1997
Daegu Metropolitan Transit		Daegu Metro Line 2	29	31.4	Munyang–Yeungnam University	18 October 2005
Daegu Metropolitan Transit		Daegu Metro Line 3	30	23.9	KNU Medical Center–Yongji	23 April 2015
Korail		Daegyeong Line	7	61.9	Gumi–Gyeongsan	14 December 2024

=== Daejeon ===
- Daejeon Metropolitan Express Transit operates the whole subway system.

Rapid transit lines in Daejeon
Operator	Livery	Line	Stations	Length (km)	Terminuses	Commencement
Daejeon Metropolitan Express Transit		Daejeon Metro Line 1	22	22.7	Panam–Banseok	16 March 2006

=== Gwangju ===
- Gwangju Metropolitan Rapid Transit operates the whole subway system.

Rapid transit lines in Gwangju
Operator	Livery	Line	Stations	Length (km)	Terminuses	Commencement
Gwangju Metropolitan Rapid Transit		Gwangju Metro Line 1	20	20.6	Nokdong–Pyeongdong	28 April 2004

== See also ==
- Transportation in South Korea
