= Muakjae station =

Train station in South Korea

무악재; Muakjae
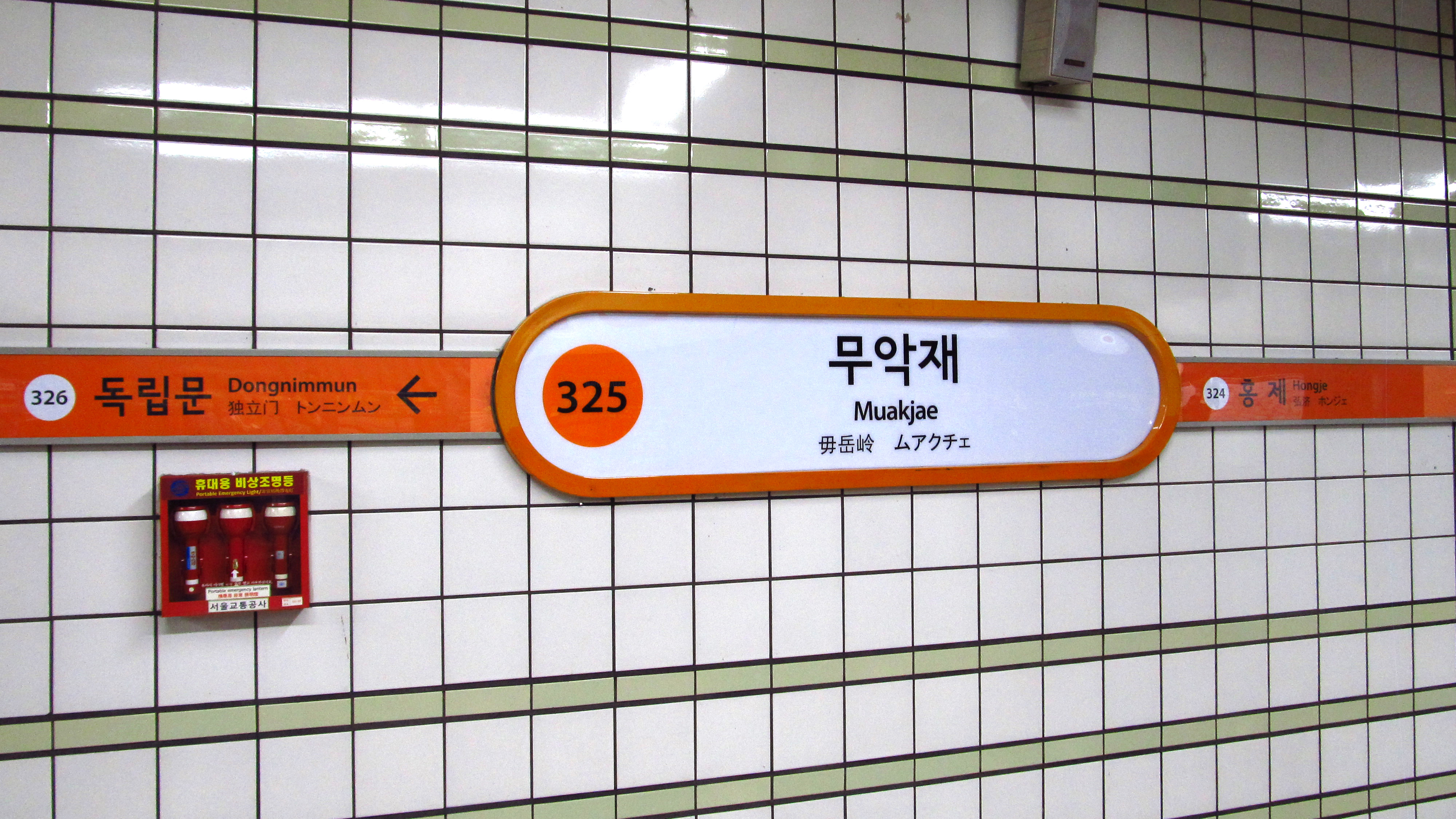

Korean name
- Hangul: 무악재역
- Hanja: 毋岳재驛
- Revised Romanization: Muakjae-yeok
- McCune–Reischauer: Muakchae-yŏk

General information
- Location: 25-1 Hongje-dong, 361 Tongillo Jiha, Seodaemun-gu, Seoul
- Coordinates: 37°34′56″N 126°57′01″E
- Operated by: Seoul Metro
- Line(s): Line 3
- Platforms: 2
- Tracks: 2

Construction
- Structure type: Underground

Key dates
- July 12, 1985: Line 3 opened

Passengers
- (Daily) Based on Jan-Dec of 2012. Line 3: 9,188

Muakjae Station is a station on Seoul Subway Line 3 in Seodaemun-gu, Seoul. The area was named Muakjae after Muhak, a Buddhist monk who played a vital role in moving the Korean capital to Seoul in the 14th century.

== Station layout ==
G	Street level	Exit

L1; Concourse	Lobby	Customer Service, Shops, Vending machines, ATMs

L2; Platforms	Side platform, doors will open on the right
L2; Platforms	Northbound	← Line 3 toward Daehwa (Hongje)
L2; Platforms	Southbound	Line 3 toward Ogeum (Dongnimmun) →
L2; Platforms	Side platform, doors will open on the right

Preceding station	Seoul Metropolitan Subway	Following station
Hongje towards Daehwa	Line 3	Dongnimmun towards Ogeum
