= Gupabal station =

Train station in South Korea

구파발 (은평성모병원); Gupabal (Eunpyeong St. Mary's Hospital)
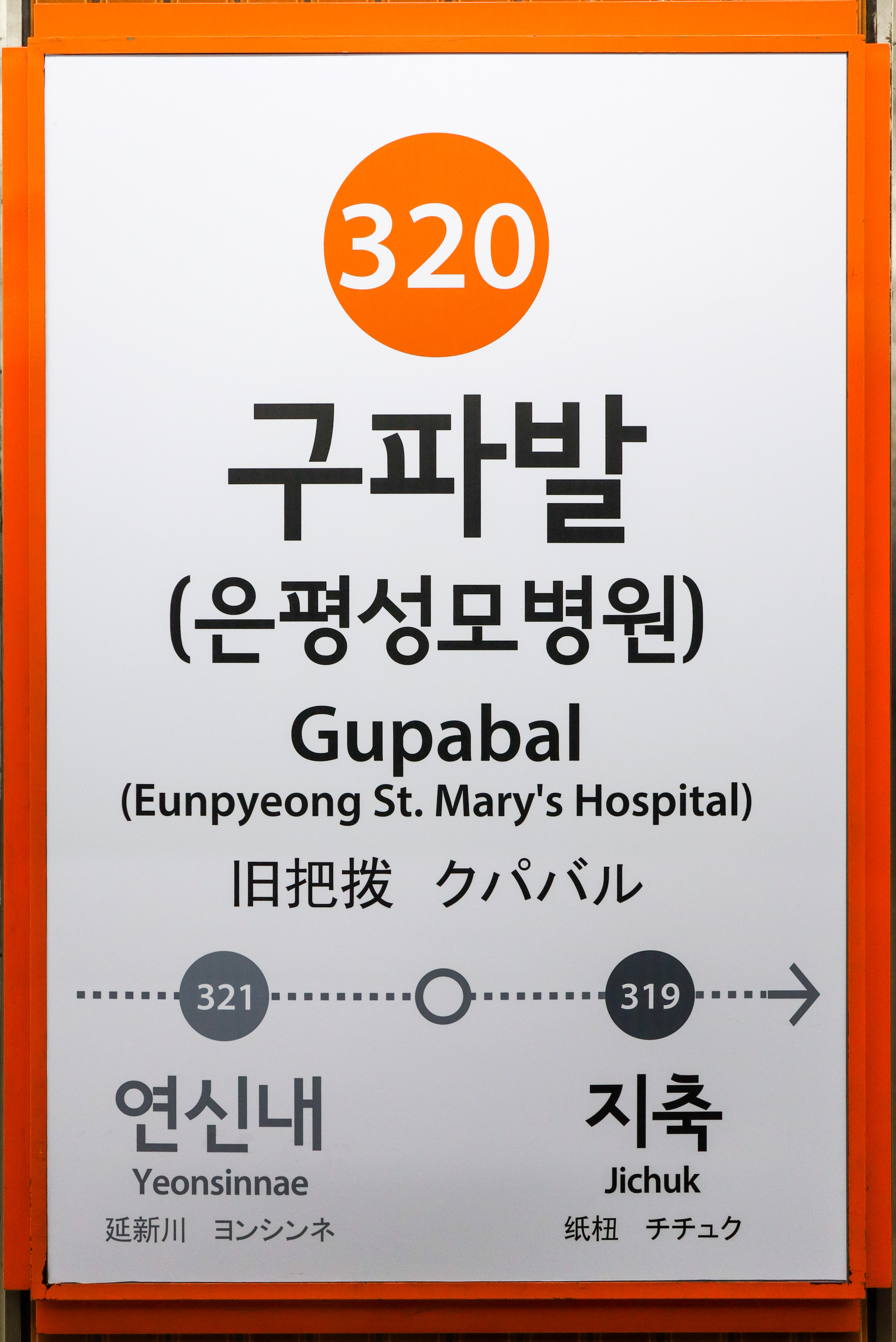

Korean name
- Hangul: 구파발역
- Hanja: 舊把撥驛
- Revised Romanization: Gupaballyeok
- McCune–Reischauer: Kup'aballyŏk

General information
- Location: 67-26 Jingwan-dong, 15-25 Jingwan 2-ro jiha Eunpyeong-gu, Seoul
- Coordinates: 37°38′12″N 126°55′08″E
- Operated by: Seoul Metro
- Line(s): Line 3
- Platforms: 1
- Tracks: 2

Construction
- Structure type: Underground

Key dates
- July 12, 1985: Line 3 opened

Passengers
- (Daily) Based on Jan-Dec of 2012. Line 3: 28,525

Gupabal Station (Korean: 구파발역) is a station on the Seoul Subway Line 3. Some Line 3 trains only offer service up to this station, although it is not the technical end of Line 3 (Seoul Metro controlled section, Jichuk is the actual end). The name comes from 'Pabal', a Joseon-era post station that existed in the area. Nearby attractions include Jingwan Neighborhood Park, Gupabal Falls, Bukhansan National Park and Seooreung, a cluster of royal tombs. Lotte Mall, Eunpyeong NewTown and Eunpyeong Hanok village is near the station.

== Station layout ==
G	Street level	Exit

L1; Concourse	Lobby	Customer Service, Shops, Vending machines, ATMs

L2; Platforms	Island platform, doors will open on the left
L2; Platforms	Northbound	← Line 3 toward Daehwa (Jichuk)
L2; Platforms	Southbound	Line 3 toward Ogeum (Yeonsinnae) →
L2; Platforms	Island platform, doors will open on the left

Preceding station	Seoul Metropolitan Subway	Following station
Jichuk towards Daehwa	Line 3	Yeonsinnae towards Ogeum
