= Samsong station =

Metro station in Goyang, South Korea

| 삼송 (중부대학교); Samsong (Joongbu Univ.) |

Korean name
- Hangul: 삼송역
- Hanja: 三松驛
- Revised Romanization: Samsong-yeok
- McCune–Reischauer: Samsong-yŏk

General information
- Location: 18-05 Samsong-dong, 194 Samsongno, Deogyang-gu, Goyang-si, Gyeonggi-do
- Coordinates: 37°39′11″N 126°53′44″E
- Operator: Korail
- Line: Line 3
- Platforms: 2
- Tracks: 2

Construction
- Structure type: Underground

Key dates
- January 30, 1996: Line 3 opened

Passengers
- (Daily) Based on Jan-Dec of 2012. Line 3: 11,455
Location

Samsong station is a subway station on Seoul Subway Line 3. The distance between this station and Wondang station is 5 km, so Wonheung station opened since December 27, 2014 between Wondang station and this station.

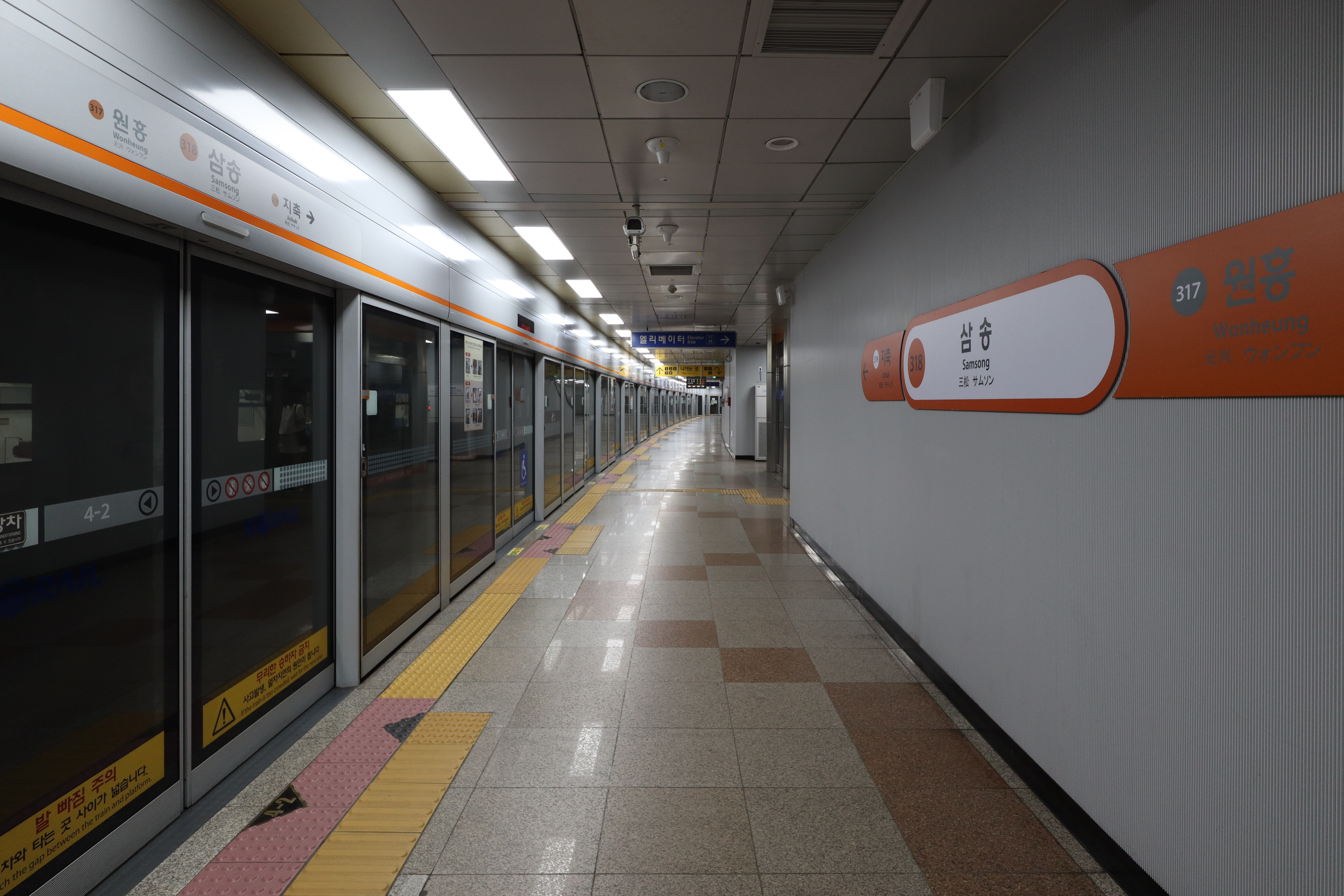

== Station layout ==
| G | Street level | Exit |

| L1; Concourse | Lobby | Customer Service, Shops, Vending machines, ATMs |

| L2; Platforms | Side platform, doors will open on the right |
| L2; Platforms | Northbound | ← Ilsan Line toward Daehwa (Wonheung) |
| L2; Platforms | Southbound | Ilsan Line toward Ogeum (Jichuk) → |
| L2; Platforms | Side platform, doors will open on the right |

== Passengers ==
| Line | Figure | | | | | | |
| Line | 2000 | 2001 | 2002 | 2003 | 2004 | 2005 | 2006 |
|---|---|---|---|---|---|---|---|
| Line 3 | 4174 | 4983 | 5246 | 5853 | 4667 | 4951 | 5293 |

| Preceding station | Seoul Metropolitan Subway | Following station |
|---|---|---|
| Wonheung towards Daehwa | Line 3 | Jichuk towards Ogeum |
