= Madu station =

Metro station in Goyang, South Korea

마두; Madu
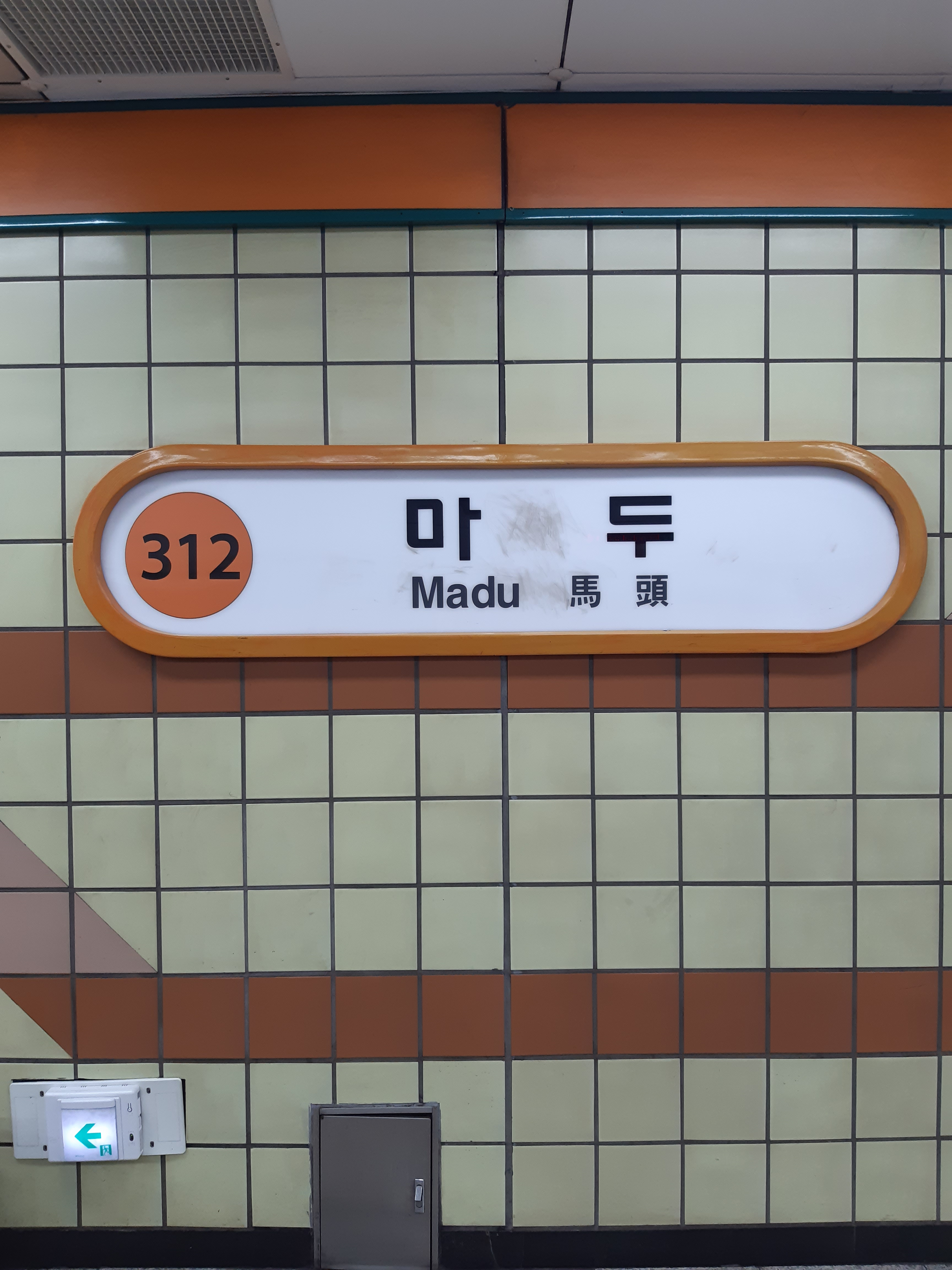
- Station nameplate

Korean name
- Hangul: 마두역
- Hanja: 馬頭驛
- Revised Romanization: Madu-yeok
- McCune–Reischauer: Madu-yŏk

General information
- Location: 1180 Jungang-ro, 765-1 Madu 2-dong, Ilsandong-gu, Goyang-si, Gyeonggi-do
- Coordinates: 37°39′07″N 126°46′39″E
- Operated by: Korail
- Line(s): Line 3
- Platforms: 2
- Tracks: 2

Construction
- Structure type: Underground

Key dates
- January 30, 1996: Line 3 opened

Passengers
- (Daily) Based on Jan-Dec of 2012. Line 3: 16,977

Madu Station is a station on Seoul Subway Line 3 in Goyang, South Korea. It is located not too far from an E-Mart. It is close to Western Dom shopping and restaurants.

== Station layout ==
G	Street level	Exit

L1; Concourse	Lobby	Customer Service, Shops, Vending machines, ATMs

L2; Platforms	Side platform, doors will open on the right
L2; Platforms	Northbound	← Ilsan Line toward Daehwa (Jeongbalsan)
L2; Platforms	Southbound	Ilsan Line toward Ogeum (Baekseok) →
L2; Platforms	Side platform, doors will open on the right

Preceding station	Seoul Metropolitan Subway	Following station
Jeongbalsan towards Daehwa	Line 3	Baekseok towards Ogeum
