= Jeongbalsan station =

Metro station in Goyang, South Korea

정발산 (고양아람누리); Jeongbalsan (Goyang AramNuri)
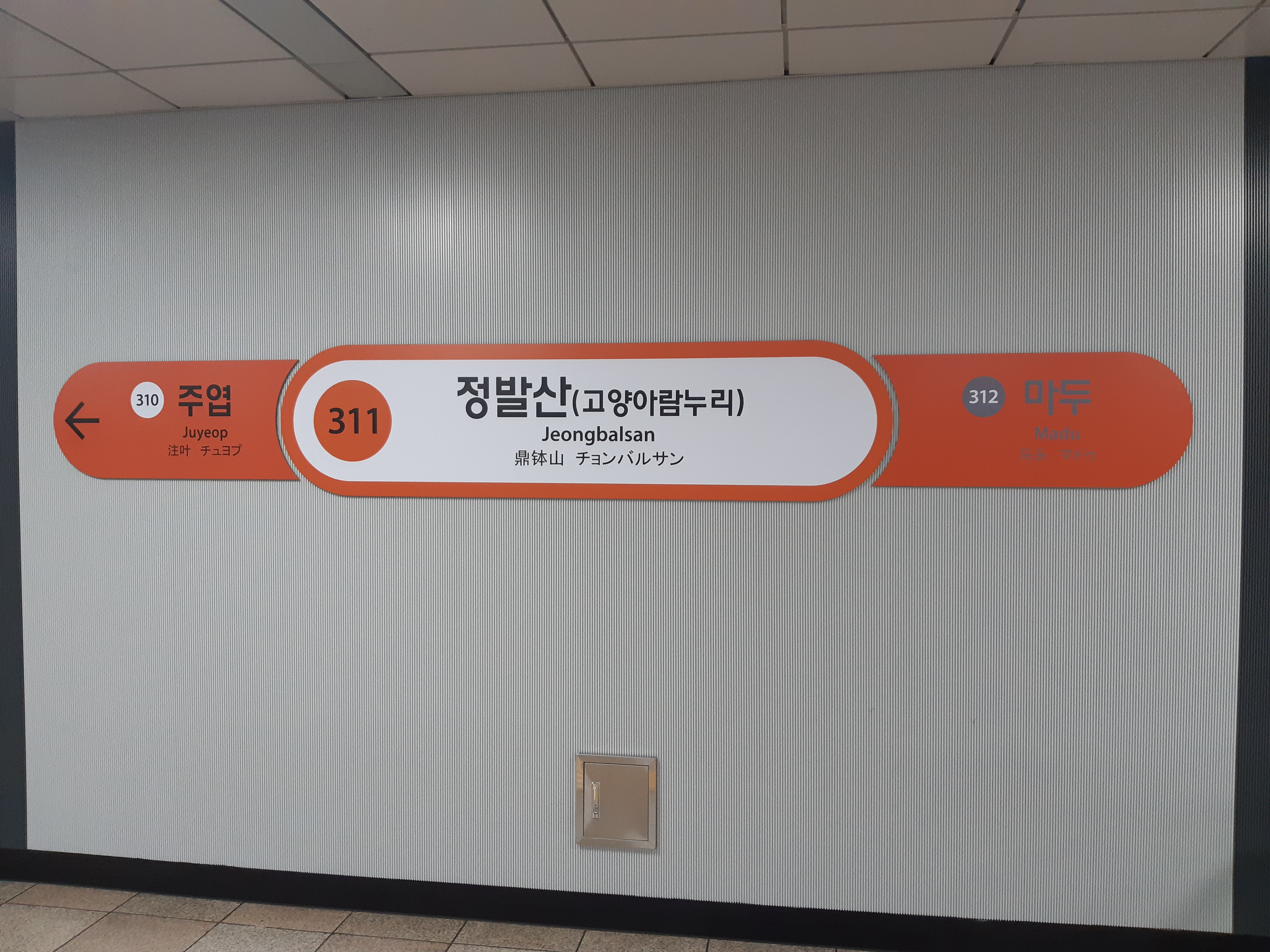

Korean name
- Hangul: 정발산역
- Hanja: 鼎鉢山驛
- Revised Romanization: Jeongbalsannyeok
- McCune–Reischauer: Chŏngbalsannyŏk

General information
- Location: 1270 Jungang-ro, 1123 Madu 1-dong, Ilsandong-gu, Goyang-si, Gyeonggi-do
- Coordinates: 37°39′34.83″N 126°46′23.85″E
- Operated by: Korail
- Line(s): Line 3
- Platforms: 2
- Tracks: 2

Construction
- Structure type: Underground

Key dates
- January 30, 1996: Line 3 opened

Passengers
- (Daily) Based on Jan-Dec of 2012. Line 3: 18,670

Jeongbalsan is a station on the Seoul Subway Line 3 in Goyang, Gyeonggi Province. It is named after a large park of the same name, adjacent to the northeastern side of the station. On the other side of the park lies the National Cancer Center of Korea. The District Office of Ilsandong-gu is located outside Exit 4.

== Station layout ==
G	Street level	Exit

L1; Concourse	Lobby	Customer Service, Shops, Vending machines, ATMs

L2; Platforms	Side platform, doors will open on the right
L2; Platforms	Northbound	← Ilsan Line toward Daehwa (Juyeop)
L2; Platforms	Southbound	Ilsan Line toward Ogeum (Madu) →
L2; Platforms	Side platform, doors will open on the right

== Vicinity ==
- Exit 1: Lake Park
- Exit 2: Lotte Department Store La Festa shops and restaurants
- Exit 3: Goyang Office of Education
- Exit 4: Ilsandong District Office, Jeongbal Middle School

Very close to the station are two large shopping areas called "La Festa' and "Western Dom."

Preceding station	Seoul Metropolitan Subway	Following station
Juyeop towards Daehwa	Line 3	Madu towards Ogeum
