= Baekseok station =

Metro station in Goyang, South Korea

백석 (건강보험일산병원); Baekseok (National Health Insurance Service Ilsan Hospital)
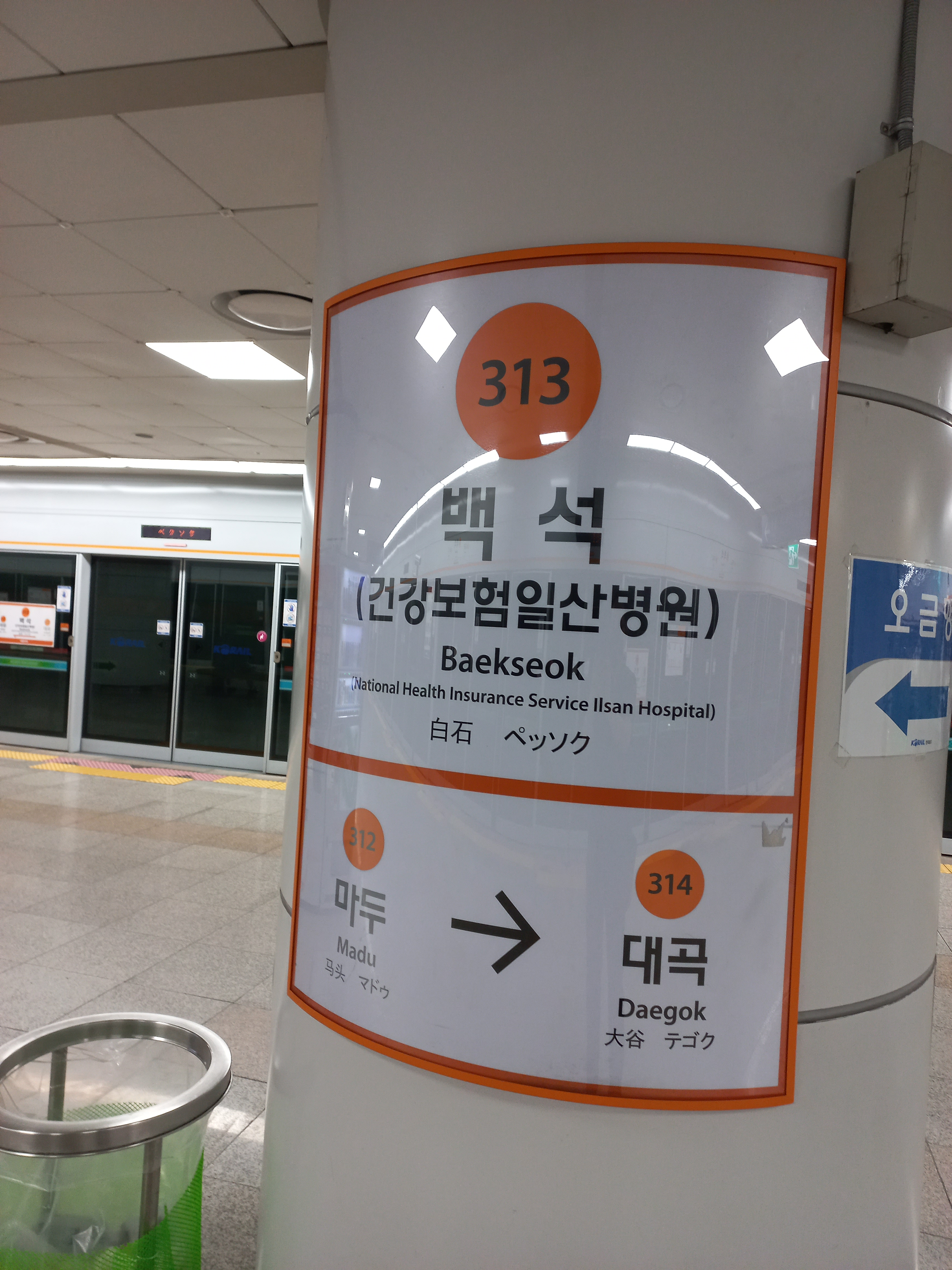

Korean name
- Hangul: 백석역
- Hanja: 白石驛
- Revised Romanization: Baekseongnyeok
- McCune–Reischauer: Paeksŏngnyŏk

General information
- Location: 1042 Jungang-ro, 629-1 Baekseok 1-dong, Ilsandong-gu, Goyang-si, Gyeonggi-do
- Coordinates: 37°38′35″N 126°47′16″E
- Operator: Korail
- Line: Line 3
- Platforms: 1
- Tracks: 2

Construction
- Structure type: Underground

Key dates
- January 30, 1996: Line 3 opened

Passengers
- (Daily) Based on Jan-Dec of 2012. Line 3: 18,716
Location

Baekseok station (Korean: 백석; Hanja: 白石), which has the subname National Health Insurance Service Ilsan Hospital, is a subway station served by Seoul Subway Line 3 of the Seoul Metropolitan Subway system. The station is located in the Ilsan ward in Goyang, Gyeonggi Province, South Korea. There are many stores and restaurants close to the station, including a Costco store.

== Station layout ==
G	Street level	Exit

L1; Concourse	Lobby	Customer Service, Shops, Vending machines, ATMs

L2; Platforms	Island platform, doors will open on the left
L2; Platforms	Northbound	← Ilsan Line toward Daehwa (Madu)
L2; Platforms	Southbound	Ilsan Line toward Ogeum (Daegok) →
L2; Platforms	Island platform, doors will open on the left

Preceding station	Seoul Metropolitan Subway	Following station
Madu towards Daehwa	Line 3	Daegok towards Ogeum
