= Hwajeong station (Goyang) =

Metro station in Goyang, South Korea

화정; Hwajeong
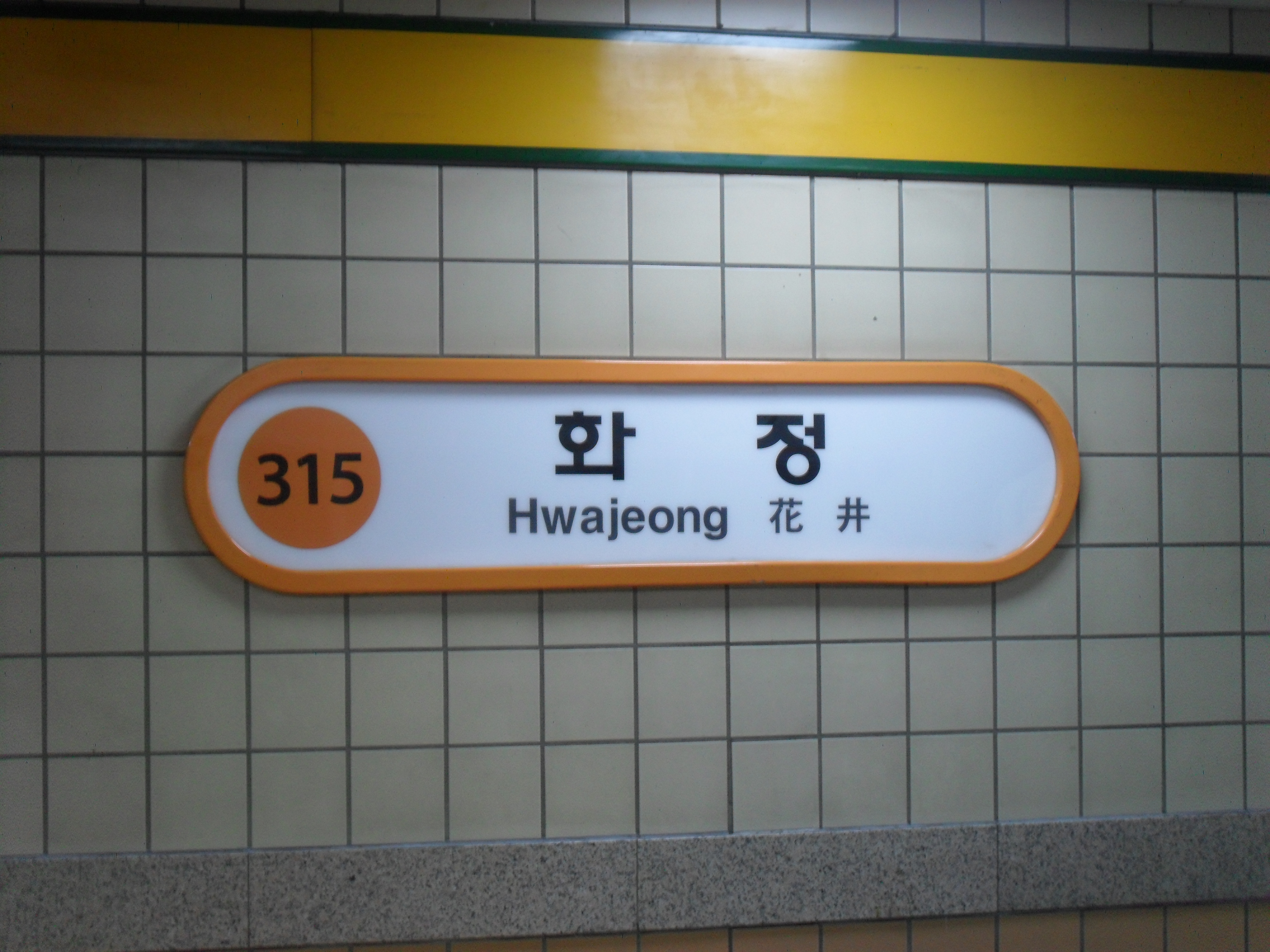

Korean name
- Hangul: 화정역
- Hanja: 花井驛
- Revised Romanization: Hwajeong-yeok
- McCune–Reischauer: Hwajŏng-yŏk

General information
- Location: 60 Hwajeong-ro, 1098 Hwajeong-dong, Deogyang-gu, Goyang-si, Gyeonggi-do
- Coordinates: 37°38′05″N 126°49′58″E
- Operator: Korail
- Line: Line 3
- Platforms: 2
- Tracks: 2

Construction
- Structure type: Underground

Key dates
- January 30, 1996: Line 3 opened

Passengers
- (Daily) Based on Jan-Dec of 2012. Line 3: 39,723
Location

Hwajeong Station is a station on Seoul Subway Line 3 in Goyang, Gyeonggi Province. It boasts the highest ridership out of all stations on the Ilsan Line section of Line 3. The District Office of Deogyang-gu is located to the north. It is located in the heart of a thriving zone for shopping and restaurants with E-Mart, Lotte Mart, and McDonald's located near the station.

== Station layout ==
G	Street level	Exit

L1; Concourse	Lobby	Customer Service, Shops, Vending machines, ATMs

L2; Platforms	Side platform, doors will open on the right
L2; Platforms	Northbound	← Ilsan Line toward Daehwa (Daegok)
L2; Platforms	Southbound	Ilsan Line toward Ogeum (Wondang) →
L2; Platforms	Side platform, doors will open on the right

== Vicinity ==
- Exit 1: Hwajeong Express Bus Terminal, Baegyang Elementary & Middle Schools
- Exit 2: Hwajeong Elementary & Middle Schools, SaveZone
- Exit 3: Deogyang District Office, Hwajeong High School, LotteMart
- Exit 4: Buyeong APT, CGV

Preceding station	Seoul Metropolitan Subway	Following station
Daegok towards Daehwa	Line 3	Wondang towards Ogeum
