= Hongje station =

Train station in South Korea

홍제; Hongje
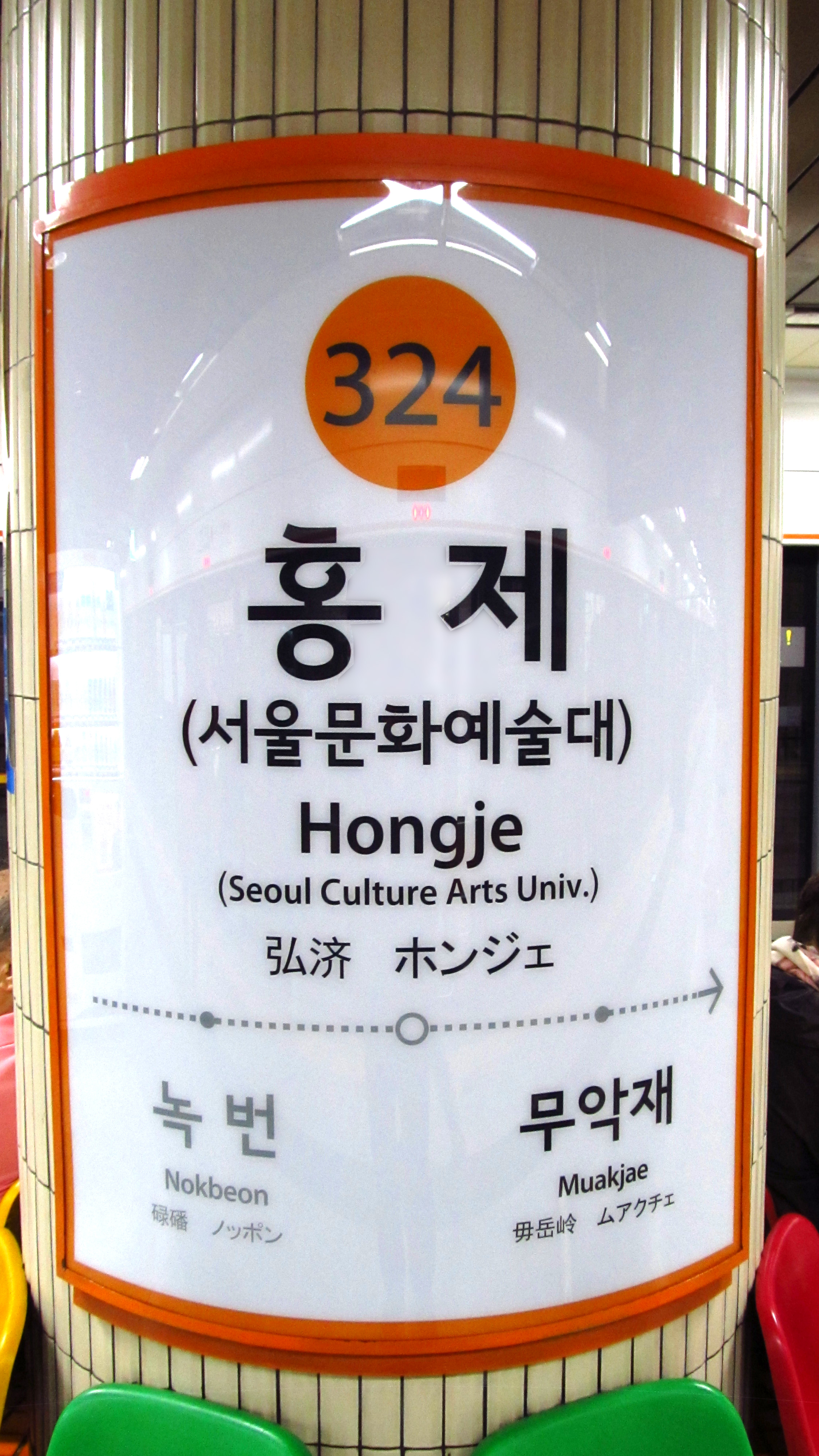

Korean name
- Hangul: 홍제역
- Hanja: 弘濟驛
- Revised Romanization: Hongje-yeok
- McCune–Reischauer: Hongje-yŏk

General information
- Location: 330-66 Hongje-dong, 440-1 Tongillo Jiha, Seodaemun-gu, Seoul
- Coordinates: 37°35′20″N 126°56′38″E
- Operated by: Seoul Metro
- Line(s): Line 3
- Platforms: 1
- Tracks: 2

Construction
- Structure type: Underground

Key dates
- July 12, 1985: Line 3 opened

Passengers
- (Daily) Based on Jan-Dec of 2012. Line 3: 40,868

Hongje Station (Korean: 홍제역) is a rapid transit station on Seoul Subway Line 3 in Seodaemun District, Seoul, South Korea.

== Station layout ==
G	Street level	Exit

L1; Concourse	Lobby	Customer Service, Shops, Vending machines, ATMs

L2; Platform	Northbound	← Line 3 toward Daehwa (Nokbeon)
L2; Platform	Island platform, doors will open on the left
L2; Platform	Southbound	Line 3 toward Ogeum (Muakjae) →

Preceding station	Seoul Metropolitan Subway	Following station
Nokbeon towards Daehwa	Line 3	Muakjae towards Ogeum
