= National Police Hospital station =

Train station in Seoul, South Korea

| 경찰병원; National Police Hospital |
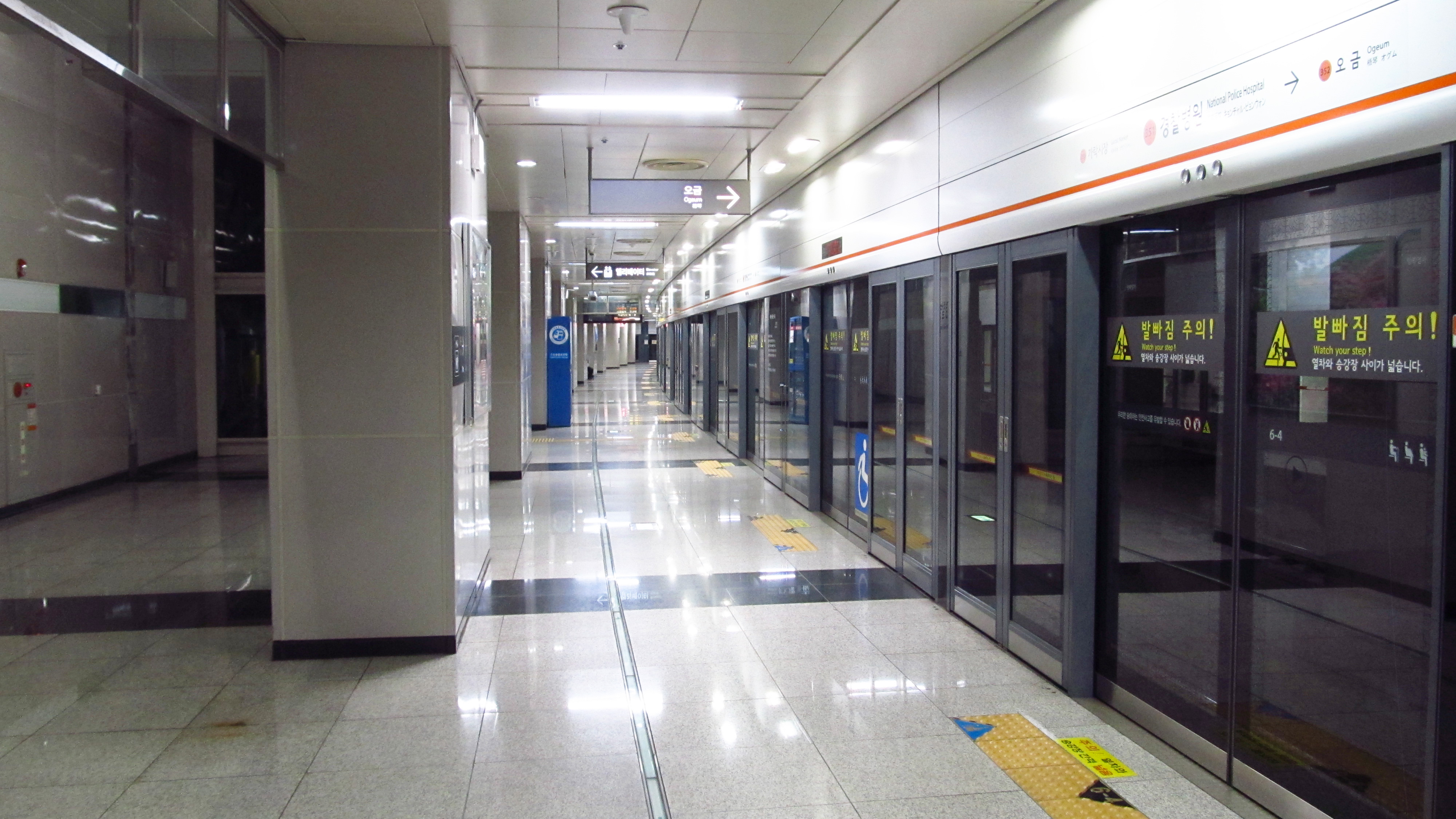

Korean name
- Hangul: 경찰병원역
- Hanja: 警察病院驛
- Revised Romanization: Gyeongchalbyeongwonnyeok
- McCune–Reischauer: Kyŏngch'albyŏngwŏnnyŏk

General information
- Location: 123 Songi-ro 58 Garak-dong, Songpa-gu, Seoul
- Coordinates: 37°29′45″N 127°07′28″E
- Operated by: Seoul Metro
- Line: Line 3
- Platforms: 2
- Tracks: 2

Construction
- Structure type: Underground

Key dates
- February 18, 2010: Line 3 opened

Passengers
- (Daily) Based on Jan-Dec of 2012. Line 3: 13,404
Location

National Police Hospital is a station on Line 3 of the Seoul Metropolitan Subway located in Songpa-gu, Seoul. On February 18, 2010, it was opened as part of an eastward extension of Line 3.

== Station layout ==
| G | Street level | Exit |

| L1; Concourse | Lobby | Customer Service, Shops, Vending machines, ATMs |

| L2; Platforms | Side platform, doors will open on the right |
| L2; Platforms | Northbound | ← Line 3 toward Daehwa (Garak Market) |
| L2; Platforms | Southbound | Line 3 toward Ogeum (Terminus) → |
| L2; Platforms | Side platform, doors will open on the right |

| Preceding station | Seoul Metropolitan Subway | Following station |
|---|---|---|
| Garak Market towards Daehwa | Line 3 | Ogeum Terminus |
