= Wonheung station =

Metro station in Goyang, South Korea

원흥; Wonheung
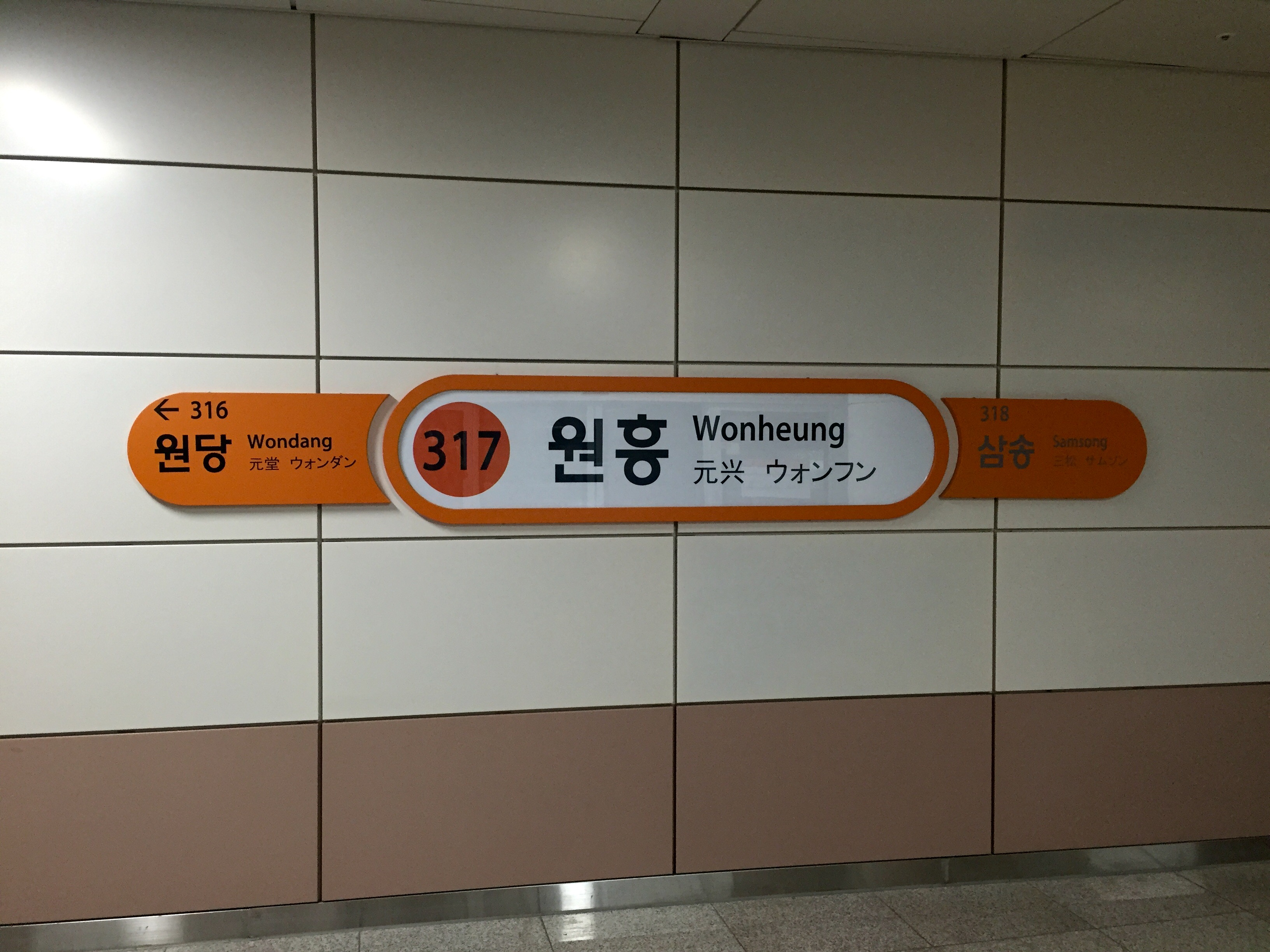

Korean name
- Hangul: 원흥역
- Hanja: 元興驛
- Revised Romanization: Wonheung-yeok
- McCune–Reischauer: Wŏnhŭng-yŏk

General information
- Location: 681 Gwonyul-daero, Deogyang-gu, Goyang-si, Gyeonggi-do
- Coordinates: 37°39′02″N 126°52′26″E
- Operated by: Korail
- Line(s): Line 3
- Platforms: 2
- Tracks: 2

Construction
- Structure type: Underground

Key dates
- December 27, 2014: Line 3 opened

Wonheung Station is a subway station on Seoul Subway Line 3. The Agricultural Cooperative University, Seosamneung, etc. are located nearby this station.

Since Wondang station and Samsong station are 5 kilometers apart, this new infill station was opened on December 27, 2014 in order to solve the problem of traffic inconvenience.

== Station layout ==
L1; Concourse	Lobby	Customer Service, Shops, Vending machines, ATMs

L2; Platforms	Side platform, doors will open on the right
L2; Platforms	Northbound	← Ilsan Line toward Daehwa (Wondang)
L2; Platforms	Southbound	Ilsan Line toward Ogeum (Samsong) →
L2; Platforms	Side platform, doors will open on the right

== Entrance ==
- Exit 1: Goyang Samsong LH Star Class Apartment
- Exit 2: Public Government Building
- Exit 3: Goyang Agriculture Technology Center
- Exit 4: Seoul Hanyang Country Club
- Exit 5: Seosamneung Hooking Place
- Exit 6: Agricultural Cooperative University
- Exit 7: Samsong Elementary School
- Exit 8: Goyang Samsong Humansia Apartment

Preceding station	Seoul Metropolitan Subway	Following station
Wondang towards Daehwa	Line 3	Samsong towards Ogeum
