= Hongje =

Hongje may refer to:

- Hongje (573–584), era name used by three Silla kings
- Hongje-dong, a dong (neighbourhood) of Seodaemun-gu in Seoul, South Korea
  - Hongje Station
