= Seoul Subway Line 3 =

Subway line in Gyeonggi-do and Seoul, South Korea

Line 3
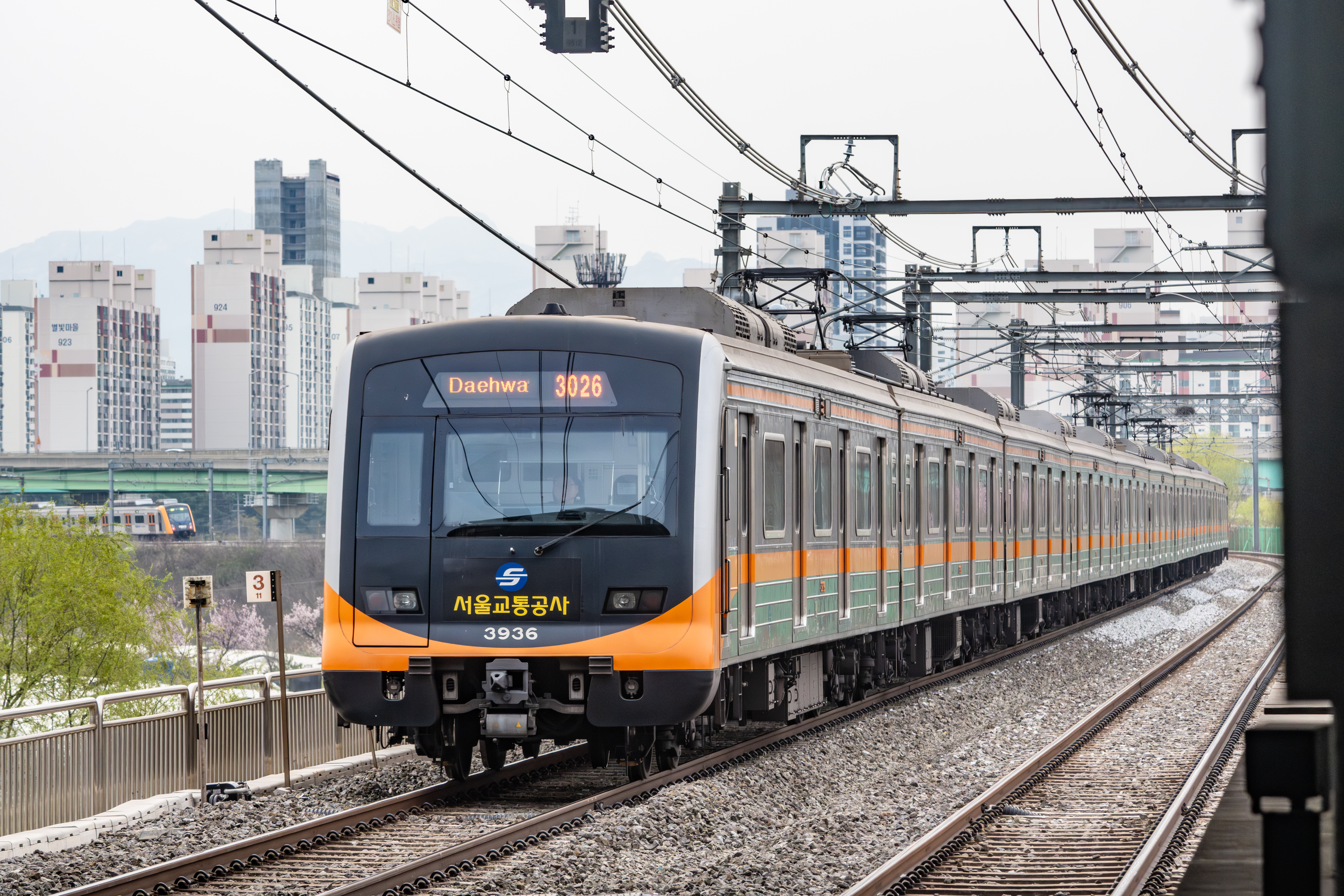
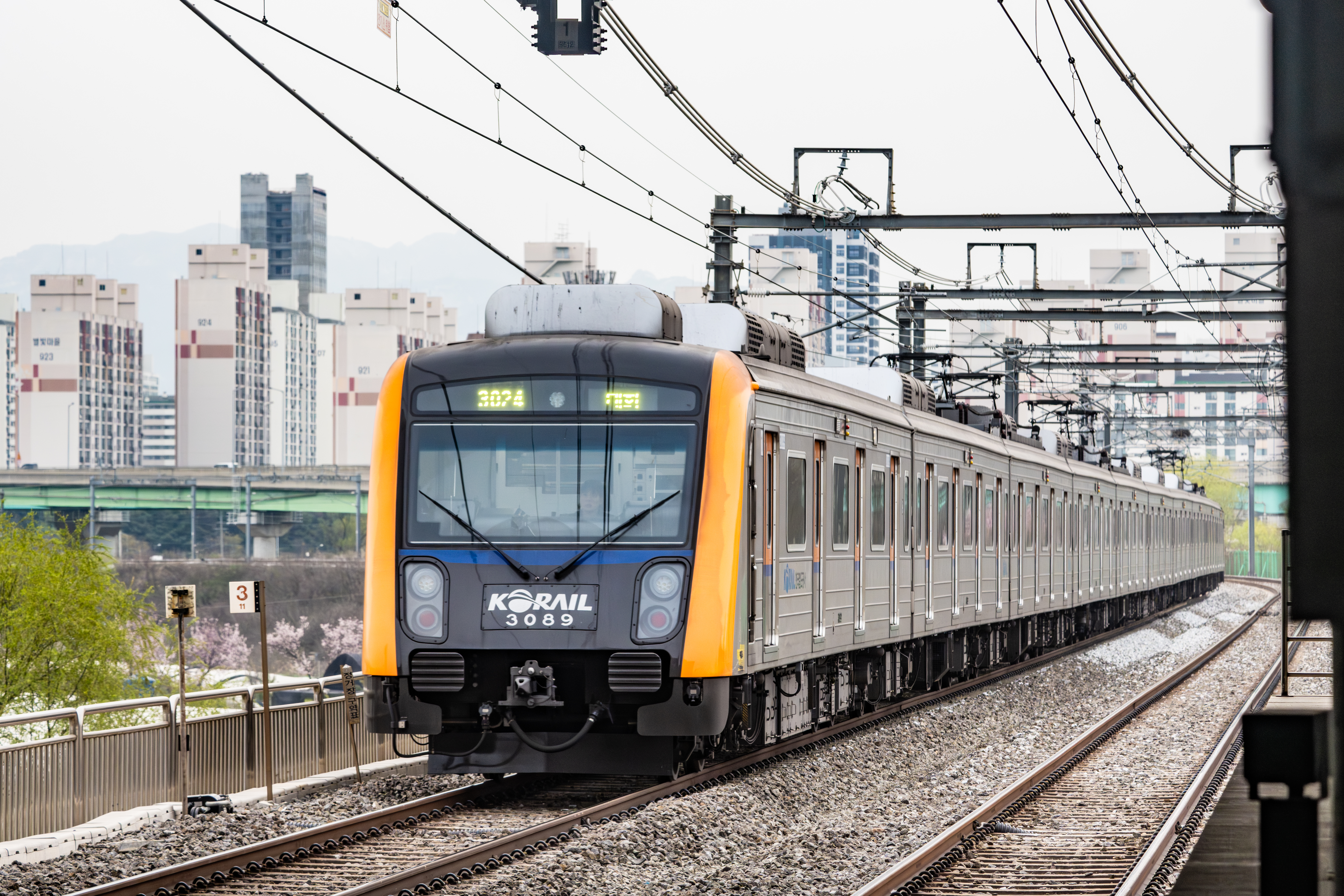
- Seoul Metro 3000 series EMU in April 2024 (up); Korail Class 3000 EMU in April 2024 (down)

Overview
- Native name: 3호선(三號線); Sam Hoseon
- Status: Operational
- Termini: Daehwa; Samsong / Suseo / Ogeum
- Stations: 44 (Note: Of which 10 are operated by Korail and 34 by Seoul Metro.)

Service
- Type: Rapid transit / Commuter Rail
- System: Seoul Metropolitan Subway
- Operator(s): Seoul Metro, Korail
- Daily ridership: 812,778 (2024)
- Ridership: 297.48 million (2024) (▲2.4%)

History
- Opened: July 12, 1985; 41 years ago
- Last extension: 2010

Technical
- Line length: 57.4 km (35.7 mi)
- Number of tracks: 2
- Electrification: 1,500 V DC overhead catenary
- Operating speed: 80 km/h (50 mph)

Seoul Subway Line 3 (dubbed The Orange Line) of the Seoul Metropolitan Subway is a rapid transit service that connects Eunpyeong District to Gangnam and southeastern Seoul. Most trains head further northwest to serve Goyang via the Ilsan Line. In 2021, the Seoul Metro operated section had an annual ridership of 237,469,000 or 650,600 passengers per day.

In December 2010 the line is recorded as having the second highest Wi-Fi data consumption in the Seoul Metropolitan area. It averaged 1.8 times more than the other 14 subway lines fitted with Wi-Fi service zones.

== History ==
Construction began in 1980, and the first section of Line 3 opened (Gupabal–Yangjae; Jichuk opened in 1990) after the completion of work in two stages during 1985, along with subway Line 4. In October 1993, a second extension to the south was opened (Yangjae–Suseo).

In March 1996, the Korail Ilsan Line opened and allowed Line 3 trains to through operate all the way to the city of Goyang. There are two depots near Jichuk station and Suseo station, which are for both Korail and Seoul Metro.

A 3-kilometre (1.9 mi) extension opened on February 18, 2010, stretching from Suseo to Garak Market (Line 8) and Ogeum (Line 5).

On December 27, 2014, Wonheung station opened between Wondang and Samsong stations.

== Tourism ==
In January 2013, the Seoul Metropolitan Rapid Transit Corporation, published free guidebooks in three languages: English, Japanese and Chinese (simplified and traditional), which features eight tours as well as recommendations for accommodations, restaurants and shopping centers. The tours are designed with different themes for travel along the subway lines, e.g. Korean traditional culture, which goes from Jongno 3-ga station to Anguk station and Gyeongbokgung station on this line that showcases antique shops and art galleries of Insa-dong.

== Stations ==
Station number	Station name English	Station name Hangul	Transfer	Line name	Distance in km	Total distance	Location	
309	Daehwa	대화		Ilsan Line	---	0.0	Gyeonggi-do	Goyang-si
310	Juyeop	주엽		Ilsan Line	1.4	1.4	Gyeonggi-do	Goyang-si
311	Jeongbalsan (Goyang AramNuri)	정발산 (고양아람누리)		Ilsan Line	1.6	3.0	Gyeonggi-do	Goyang-si
312	Madu	마두		Ilsan Line	0.9	3.9	Gyeonggi-do	Goyang-si
313	Baekseok (National Health Insurance Service Ilsan Hospital)	백석 (건강보험일산병원)		Ilsan Line	1.4	5.3	Gyeonggi-do	Goyang-si
314	Daegok	대곡	Gyeongui–Jungang Line Seohae Line Great Train eXpress	Ilsan Line	2.5	7.8	Gyeonggi-do	Goyang-si
315	Hwajeong	화정		Ilsan Line	2.1	9.9	Gyeonggi-do	Goyang-si
316	Wondang	원당		Ilsan Line	2.6	12.5	Gyeonggi-do	Goyang-si
317	Wonheung	원흥		Ilsan Line	2.9	15.4	Gyeonggi-do	Goyang-si
318	Samsong	삼송		Ilsan Line	2.1	17.5	Gyeonggi-do	Goyang-si
319	Jichuk	지축		Ilsan Line	1.7	19.2	Gyeonggi-do	Goyang-si
320	Gupabal (Eunpyeong St. Mary's Hospital)	구파발 (은평성모병원)		Seoul Metro Line 3	1.5	20.7	Seoul	Eunpyeong-gu
321	Yeonsinnae	연신내	Great Train eXpress	Seoul Metro Line 3	2.0	22.7	Seoul	Eunpyeong-gu
322	Bulgwang	불광	Seoul Subway Line 6	Seoul Metro Line 3	1.3	24.0	Seoul	Eunpyeong-gu
323	Nokbeon	녹번		Seoul Metro Line 3	1.1	25.1	Seoul	Eunpyeong-gu
324	Hongje	홍제		Seoul Metro Line 3	1.6	26.7	Seoul	Seodaemun-gu
325	Muakjae	무악재		Seoul Metro Line 3	0.9	27.6	Seoul	Seodaemun-gu
326	Dongnimmun	독립문		Seoul Metro Line 3	1.1	28.7	Seoul	Seodaemun-gu
327	Gyeongbokgung (Government Complex-Seoul)	경복궁 (정부서울청사)		Seoul Metro Line 3	1.6	30.3	Seoul	Jongno-gu
328	Anguk (Hyundai E & C)	안국 (현대건설)		Seoul Metro Line 3	1.1	31.4	Seoul	Jongno-gu
329	Jongno 3(sam)-ga	종로3가	Seoul Subway Line 1 Seoul Subway Line 5	Seoul Metro Line 3	1.0	32.4	Seoul	Jongno-gu
330	Euljiro 3(sam)-ga (Shinhan Card)	을지로3가 (신한카드)	Seoul Subway Line 2	Seoul Metro Line 3	0.6	33.0	Seoul	Jung-gu
331	Chungmuro	충무로	Seoul Subway Line 4	Seoul Metro Line 3	0.7	33.7	Seoul	Jung-gu
332	Dongguk Univ.	동대입구		Seoul Metro Line 3	0.9	34.6	Seoul	Jung-gu
333	Yaksu	약수	Seoul Subway Line 6	Seoul Metro Line 3	0.7	35.3	Seoul	Jung-gu
334	Geumho	금호		Seoul Metro Line 3	0.8	36.1	Seoul	Seongdong-gu
335	Oksu	옥수	Gyeongui–Jungang Line	Seoul Metro Line 3	0.8	36.9	Seoul	Seongdong-gu
336	Apgujeong (Hyundai Department Store)	압구정 (현대백화점)		Seoul Metro Line 3	2.1	39.0	Seoul	Gangnam-gu
337	Sinsa	신사	Shinbundang Line	Seoul Metro Line 3	1.5	40.5	Seoul	Gangnam-gu
338	Jamwon	잠원		Seoul Metro Line 3	0.9	41.4	Seoul	Seocho-gu
339	Express Bus Terminal	고속터미널	Seoul Subway Line 7 Seoul Subway Line 9	Seoul Metro Line 3	1.2	42.6	Seoul	Seocho-gu
340	Seoul Nat'l Univ. of Education (Court & Prosecutors' Office)	교대 (법원·검찰청)	Seoul Subway Line 2	Seoul Metro Line 3	1.6	44.2	Seoul	Seocho-gu
341	Nambu Bus Terminal (Seoul Arts Center)	남부터미널 (예술의전당)		Seoul Metro Line 3	0.9	45.1	Seoul	Seocho-gu
342	Yangjae (Seocho-gu Office)	양재 (서초구청)	Shinbundang Line	Seoul Metro Line 3	1.8	46.9	Seoul	Seocho-gu
343	Maebong	매봉		Seoul Metro Line 3	1.2	48.1	Seoul	Gangnam-gu
344	Dogok	도곡	Suin–Bundang Line	Seoul Metro Line 3	0.8	48.9	Seoul	Gangnam-gu
345	Daechi	대치		Seoul Metro Line 3	0.8	49.7	Seoul	Gangnam-gu
346	Hangnyeoul	학여울		Seoul Metro Line 3	0.8	50.5	Seoul	Gangnam-gu
347	Daecheong (SH Corporation)	대청 (서울주택도시공사)		Seoul Metro Line 3	0.9	51.4	Seoul	Gangnam-gu
348	Irwon	일원		Seoul Metro Line 3	1.2	52.6	Seoul	Gangnam-gu
349	Suseo	수서	Suin–Bundang Line Great Train eXpress	Seoul Metro Line 3	1.8	54.4	Seoul	Gangnam-gu
350	Garak Market	가락시장	Seoul Subway Line 8	Seoul Metro Line 3	1.2	55.6	Seoul	Songpa-gu
351	National Police Hospital	경찰병원		Seoul Metro Line 3	0.8	56.4	Seoul	Songpa-gu
352	Ogeum	오금	Seoul Subway Line 5	Seoul Metro Line 3	0.6	57.0	Seoul	Songpa-gu
353	Oryunsamgeori (2032)	오륜삼거리		Songpa Hanam Line	---	---	Seoul	Songpa-gu
354	Gamil (2032)	감일		Songpa Hanam Line	---	---	Gyeonggi-do	Hanam-si
355	Chungung (2032)	춘궁		Songpa Hanam Line	---	---	Gyeonggi-do	Hanam-si
356	Gyosan (2032)	교산		Songpa Hanam Line	---	---	Gyeonggi-do	Hanam-si
357	Cheonhyeon (2032)	천현		Songpa Hanam Line	---	---	Gyeonggi-do	Hanam-si
358	Hanam City Hall (2032)	하남시청	Seoul Subway Line 5	Songpa Hanam Line	---	---	Gyeonggi-do	Hanam-si

== Rolling stock ==
=== Current ===
- VVVF inverter-controlled electric car
  - First generation – since 2009
  - Second generation – since 2022
- Korail Class 3000
  - Second generation – since 2023
  - Third generation – since 2023
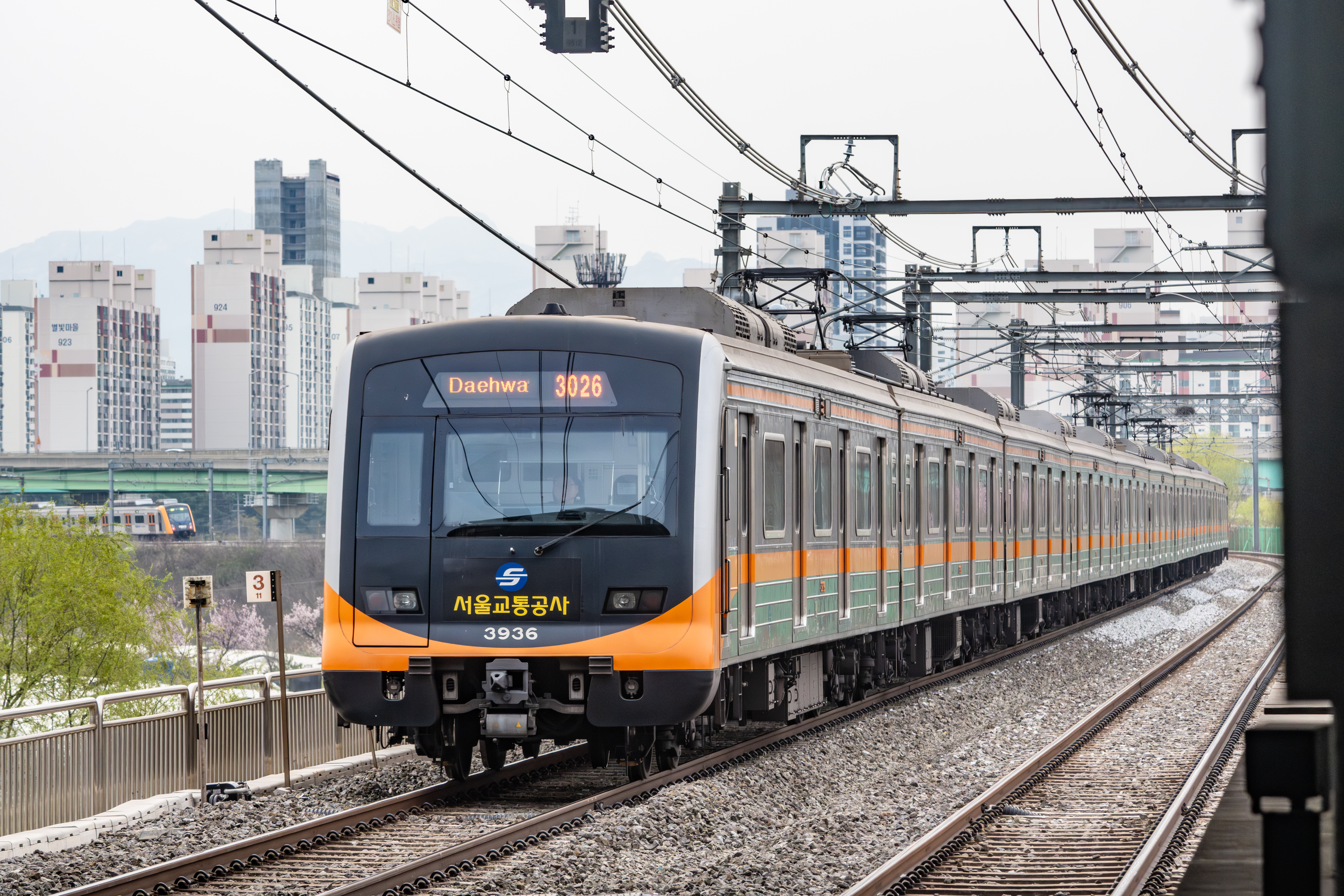
Seoul Metro 3000 series VVVF inverter-controlled (First generation)

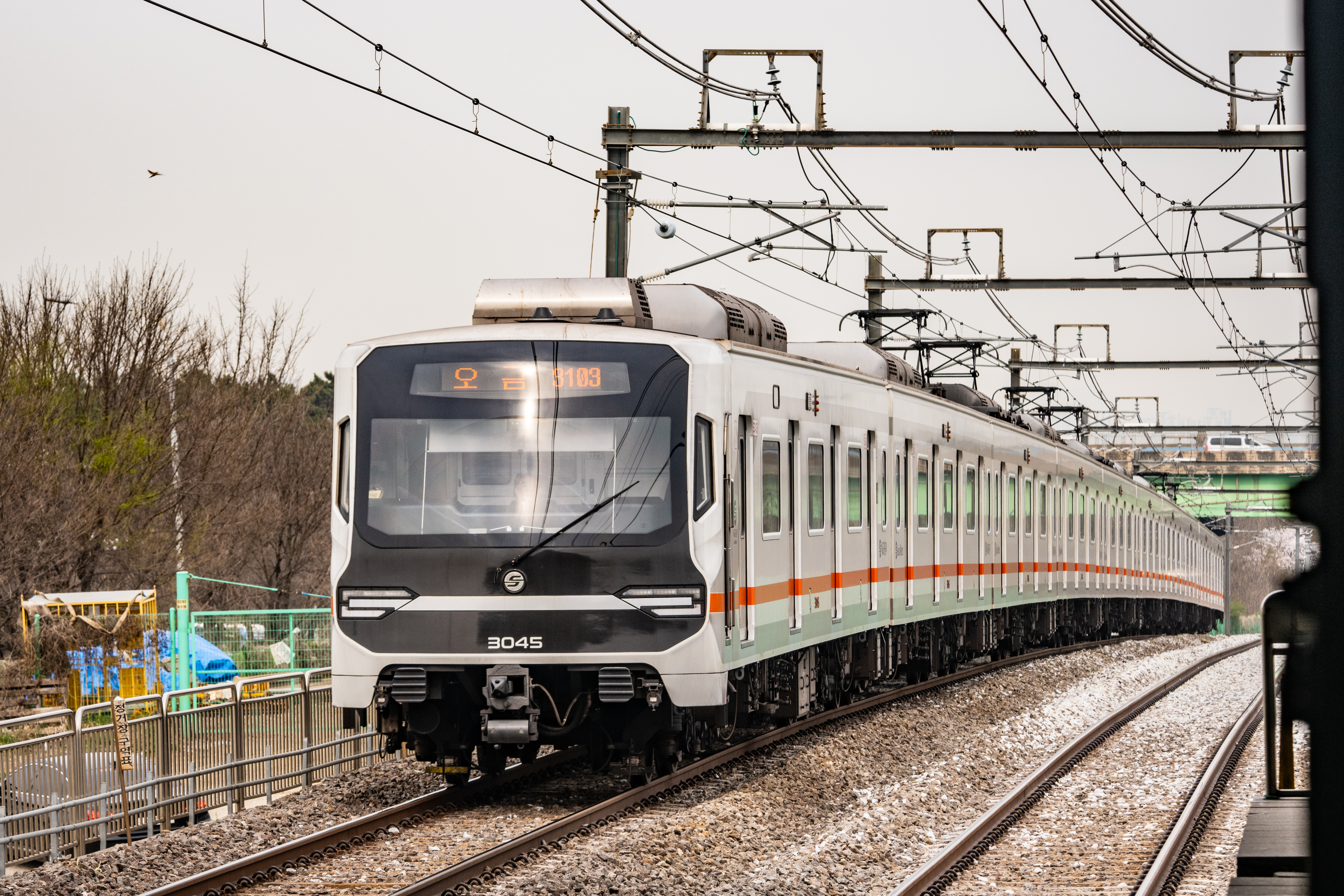
Seoul Metro 3000 series VVVF inverter-controlled (Second generation)

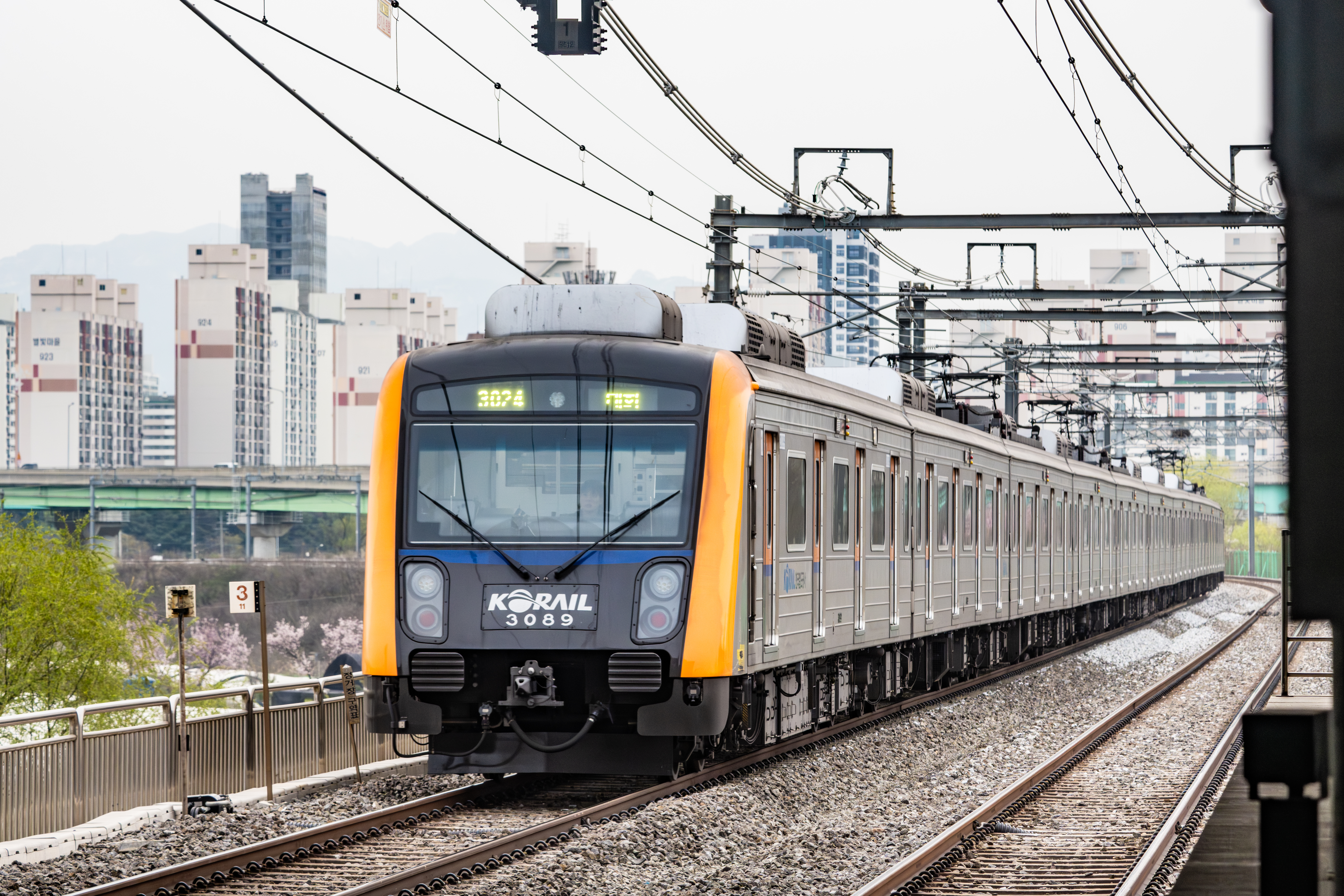
Korail Class 3000 (Second generation)

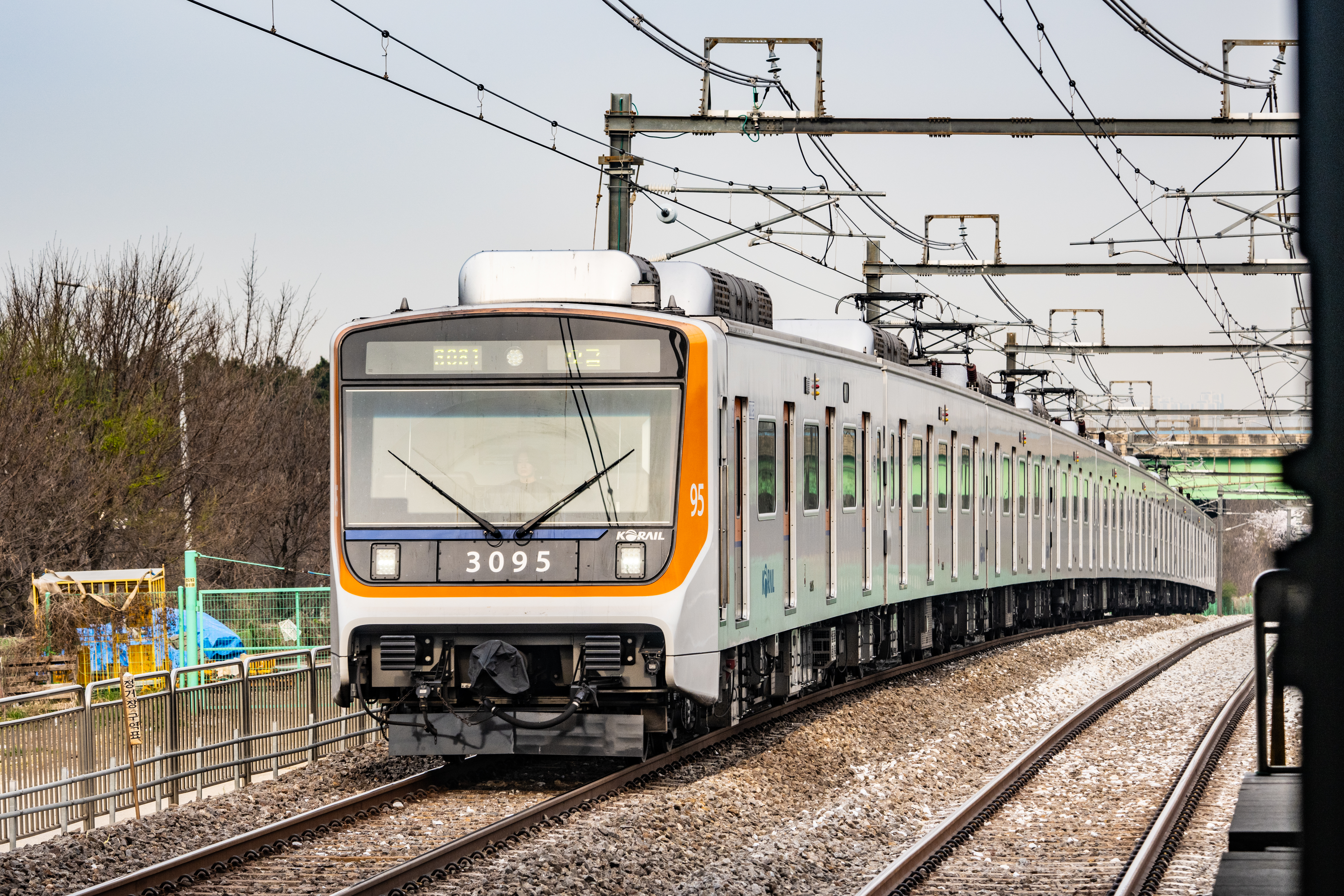
Korail Class 3000 (Third generation)

=== Former ===
- Seoul Metro 3000 series
  - Chopper-controlled from GEC Traction electric car (from 1989–2022, some transferred from Seoul Subway Line 4)
  - Chopper-controlled from GEC Traction electric car (rebuilt cars) (from 2010–2022)
- Korail Class 3000
  - First generation (from 1995–2024)
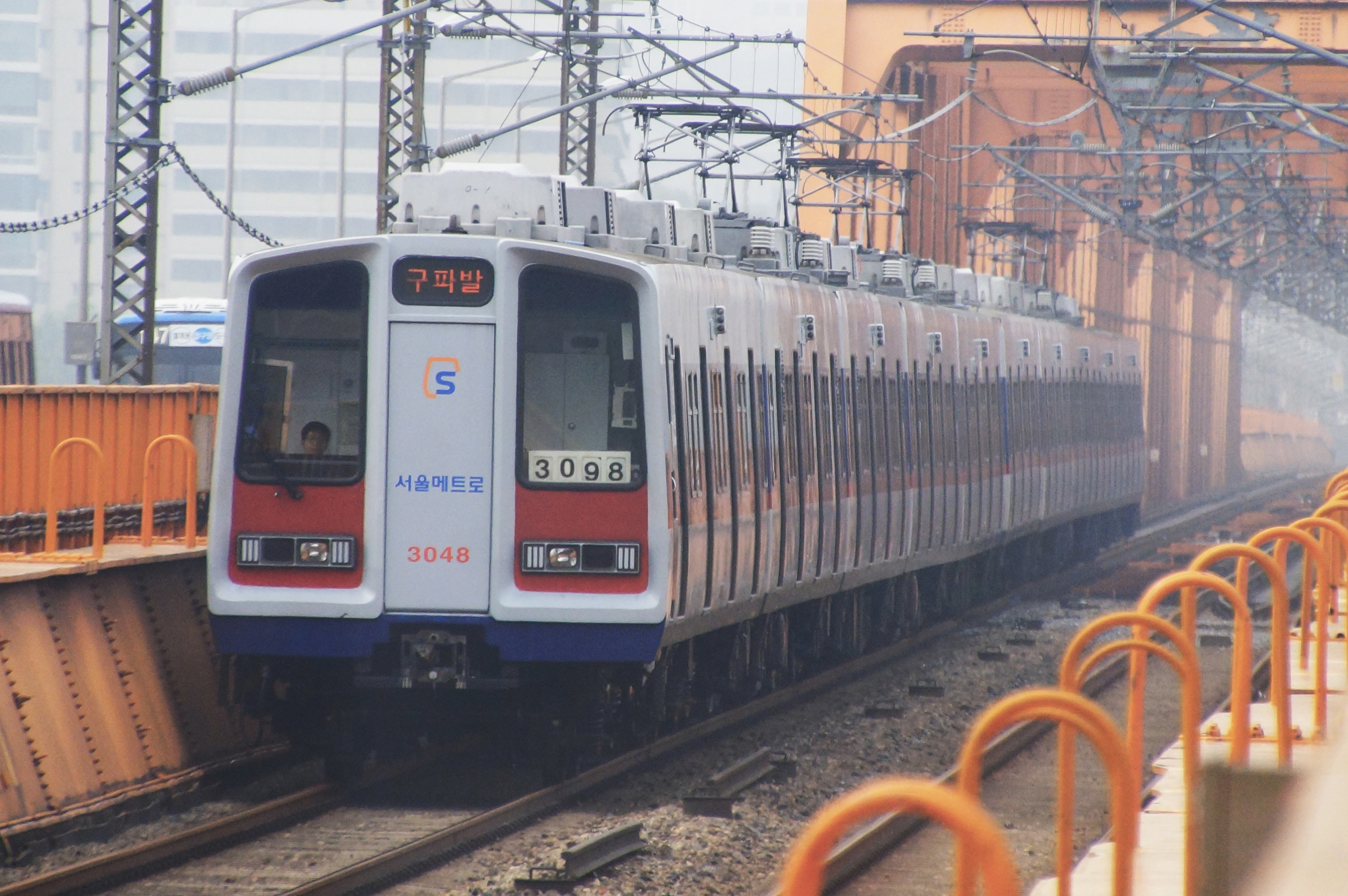
Seoul Metro 3000 series Chopper-controlled EMU

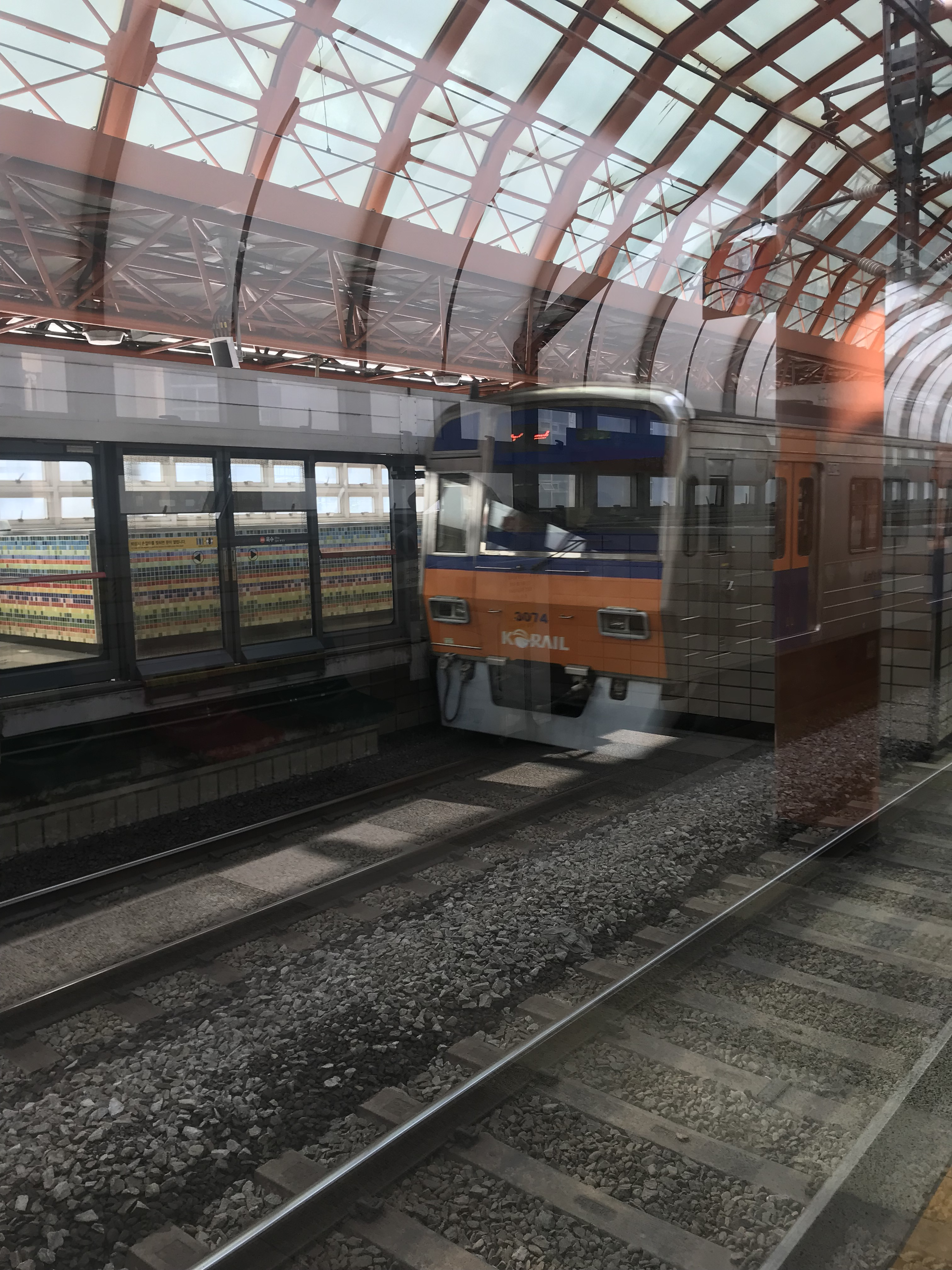
Korail Class 3000 (First generation)

== Ridership ==
Seoul Subway Line 3 Ridership (Note: The ridership is calculated based on boarding and transferring passengers (a+c). The data tallies between the two sources but the Seoul Metro source is more granular. The ridership data is derived from the 서울교통공사 수송실적 (Seoul Metro transport performance) data/report.)
Year	Ridership	Change (%)	Remarks
2026	151,184,252		Updated as of June 2026
2025	298,558,248	▲0.4	
2024	297,476,748	▲2.4	
2023	290,572,000	▲8.9	
2022	266,773,000	▲12.3	
2021	237,469,000	▲1.0	
2020	235,105,000	▼28.7	COVID-19 pandemic
2019	329,661,000	▲1.5	Highest on record
2018	324,831,000	▼0.8	
2017	327,438,000	▼0.2	
2016	328,117,000	▲14.6	
2015	286,361,000	▼2.5	
2014	293,775,000	▲1.4	
2013	289,693,000	▲1.3	
2012	286,037,000	▲1.1	
2011	282,998,000	▲2.7	
2010	275,467,000	▲7.0	Phase 3 opens
2009	257,501,000	▲0.4	
2008	256,548,000	▲0.1	
2007	256,173,000	▼0.5	
2006	257,544,000	▼0.6	
2005	259,166,000	▼2.3	
2004	265,398,000	▲0.6	
2003	263,873,000	▼0.5	
2002	265,142,000	▲2.3	
2001	259,142,000	▲9.0	
2000	237,669,000	▲4.4	
1999	227,611,000	▼2.7	
1998	234,010,000	▼5.4	
1997	247,368,000	-	

== See also ==
- Subways in South Korea
- Seoul Metropolitan Subway
