= Juyeop station =

Metro station in Goyang, South Korea

주엽; Juyeop
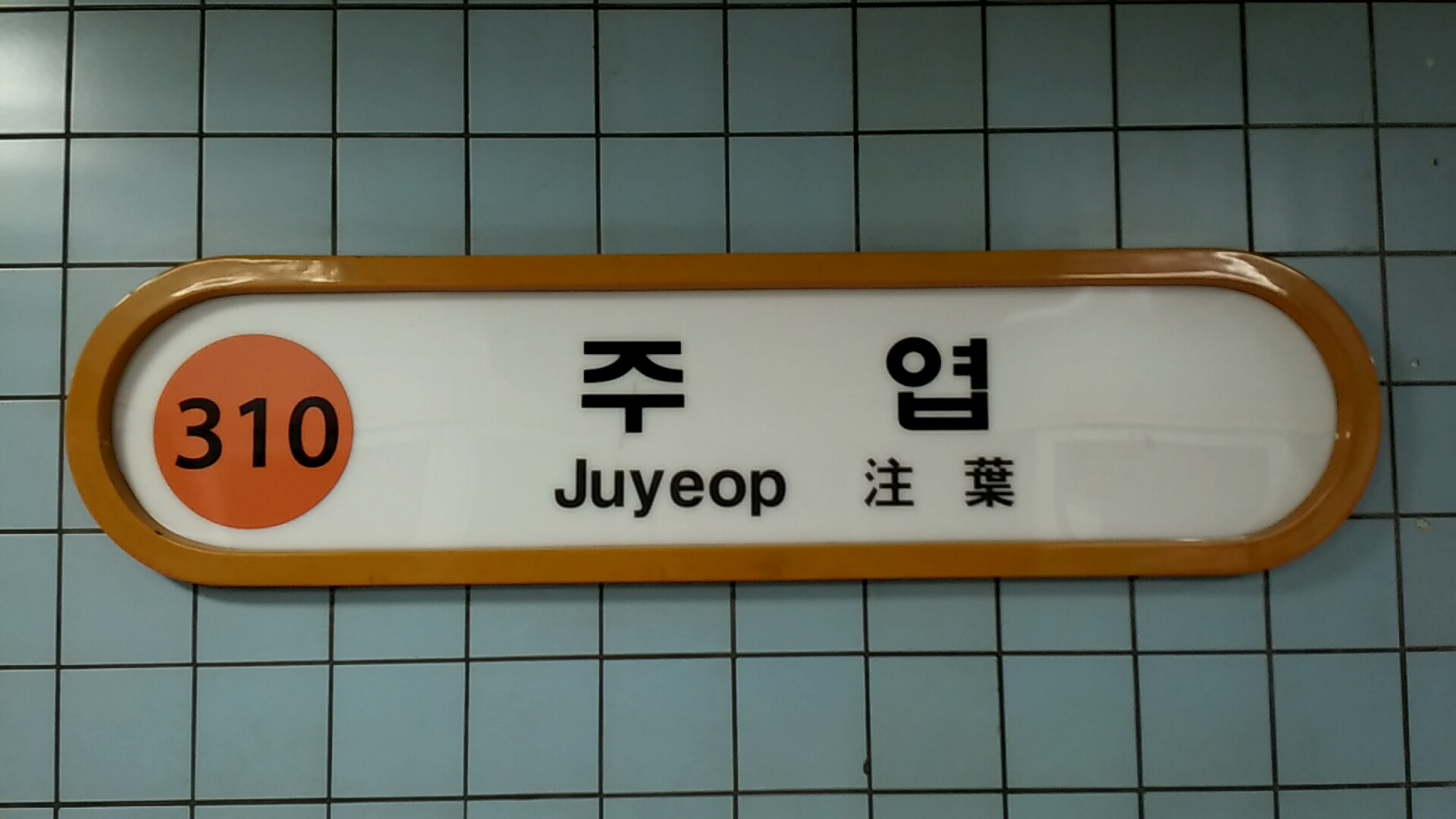

Korean name
- Hangul: 주엽역
- Hanja: 注葉驛
- Revised Romanization: Juyeobyeok
- McCune–Reischauer: Chuyŏbyŏk

General information
- Location: 1432 Jungang-ro, 166-7 Juyeop-dong, Ilsanseo-gu, Goyang-si, Gyeonggi Province
- Coordinates: 37°40′12.57″N 126°45′40.48″E
- Operated by: Korail
- Line(s): Line 3
- Platforms: 2
- Tracks: 2

Construction
- Structure type: Underground

Key dates
- January 30, 1996: Line 3 opened

Passengers
- (Daily) Based on Jan-Dec of 2012. Line 3: 18,687

Juyeop Station is a station on Seoul Subway Line 3 in Goyang, Gyeonggi Province.

The name Juyeop is derived from the story that when the village was viewed from the top of the nearby mountain, the topography of the entire village was shaped like a leaf(엽;葉 meaning leaf), and the word Ju(주;注 meaning pour/flow) came from the story of a large leaf flowing down the creek in the middle of village during Autumn.

== Station layout ==
G	Street level	Exit

L1; Concourse	Lobby	Customer Service, Shops, Vending machines, ATMs

L2; Platforms	Side platform, doors will open on the right
L2; Platforms	Northbound	← Ilsan Line toward Daehwa (Terminus)
L2; Platforms	Southbound	Ilsan Line toward Ogeum (Jeongbalsan) →
L2; Platforms	Side platform, doors will open on the right

Preceding station	Seoul Metropolitan Subway	Following station
Daehwa Terminus	Line 3	Jeongbalsan towards Ogeum
