= Wondang station =

Metro station in Goyang, South Korea

원당; Wondang
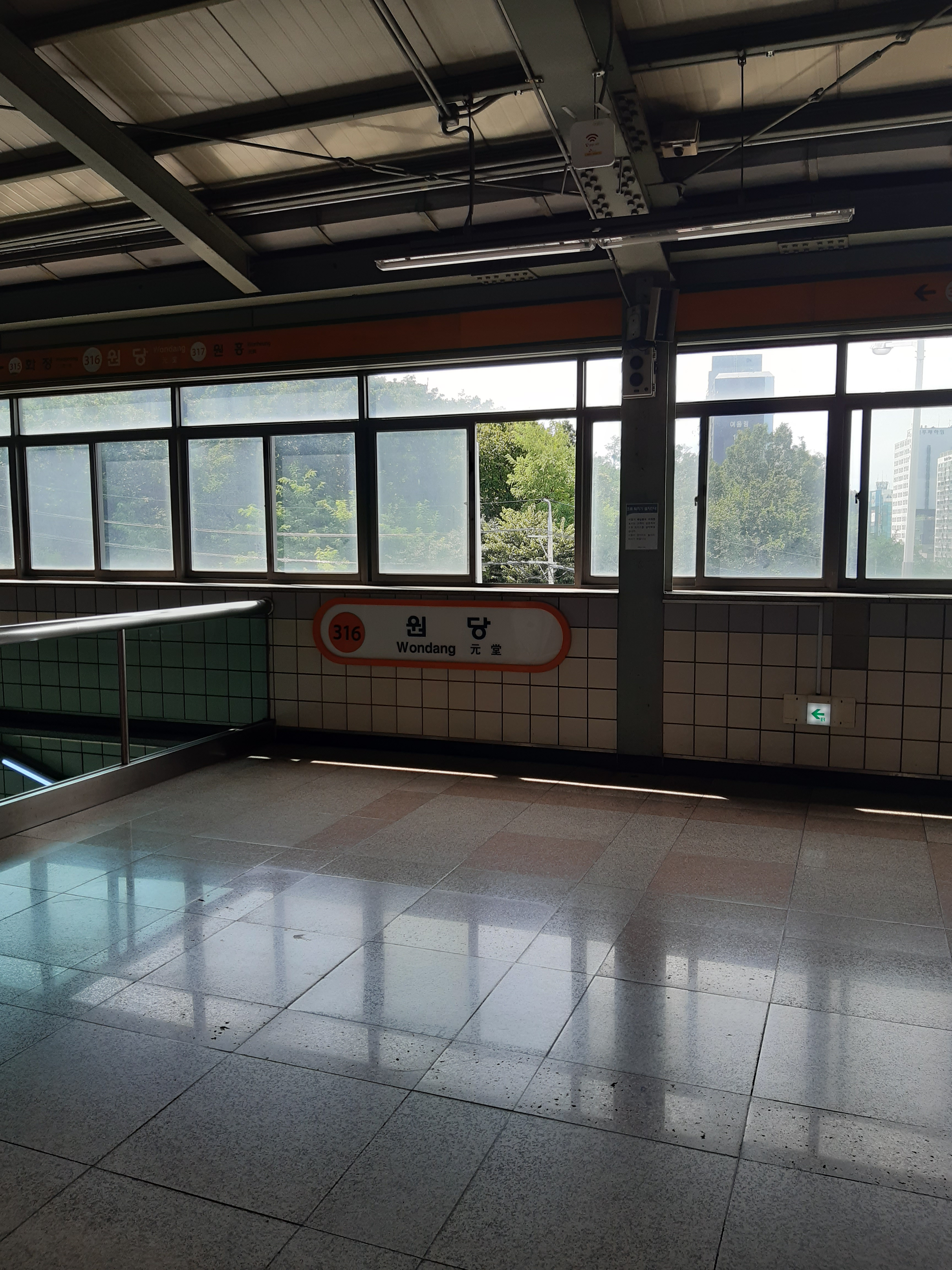

Korean name
- Hangul: 원당역
- Hanja: 元堂驛
- Revised Romanization: Wondang-yeok
- McCune–Reischauer: Wŏndang-yŏk

General information
- Location: 410-7 Seongsa 1-dong, Deogyang-gu, Goyang-si, Gyeonggi-do
- Coordinates: 37°39′12″N 126°50′35″E
- Operated by: Korail
- Line(s): Line 3
- Platforms: 2
- Tracks: 2

Construction
- Structure type: Aboveground

Key dates
- January 30, 1996: Line 3 opened

Passengers
- (Daily) Based on Jan-Dec of 2012. Line 3: 24,738

Wondang station is on Seoul Subway Line 3 in Goyang, Gyeonggi Province. Goyang City Hall is nearby. There is a lot of building work in the area undertaken by SK, Daewoo and other companies; including many apartment complexes, shopping malls and a multiplex cinema.

== Station layout ==
G	Street level	Exit

L1; Concourse	Lobby	Customer Service, Shops, Vending machines, ATMs

L2; Platforms	Side platform, doors will open on the right
L2; Platforms	Northbound	← Ilsan Line toward Daehwa (Hwajeong)
L2; Platforms	Southbound	Ilsan Line toward Ogeum (Wonheung) →
L2; Platforms	Side platform, doors will open on the right

== Entrance ==
- Exit 1, 2 : Way to NH bank of Seongnae
- Exit 3 : Mineral spring

== Information around the station ==
- Goyang City Hall
- Goyang Eoullim Nuri
- Goyang Eoullim Nuri Byeolmuri Stadium (home stadium of Goyang Citizens’ Soccer Team, K4 League, Korea)
- Goyang Eoullim Nuri Ice Maru
- Deokyang Senior Welfare Center
- Deokyang Health Center
- City Council
- Wondang Market
- Baskin Robbins Ilsan Wondang Branch
- Gyeonggi-do Goyang Office of Education
- Seongra Elementary School
- Seongsa 1-dong Administrative Welfare Center
- Wondang Nonghyup Wondang Station Branch
- Wondang Social Welfare Center
- Wondang District
- The living environment is a 5-minute walk from Wondang Market and Hanaro Mart’s local food market, so you can gain vitality and use it in a variety of ways within the Wondang Central Business District. E-Mart, Save Zone, IKEA, and Starfield are 15 minutes away by car. It has educational conditions such as Seongracho, Wondangcho, Seongsa Elementary and Middle School, Oullimnuriwa Literature Center, and Goyang City Library.

Preceding station	Seoul Metropolitan Subway	Following station
Hwajeong towards Daehwa	Line 3	Wonheung towards Ogeum
