= Jichuk station =

Metro station in Goyang, South Korea

지축; Jichuk
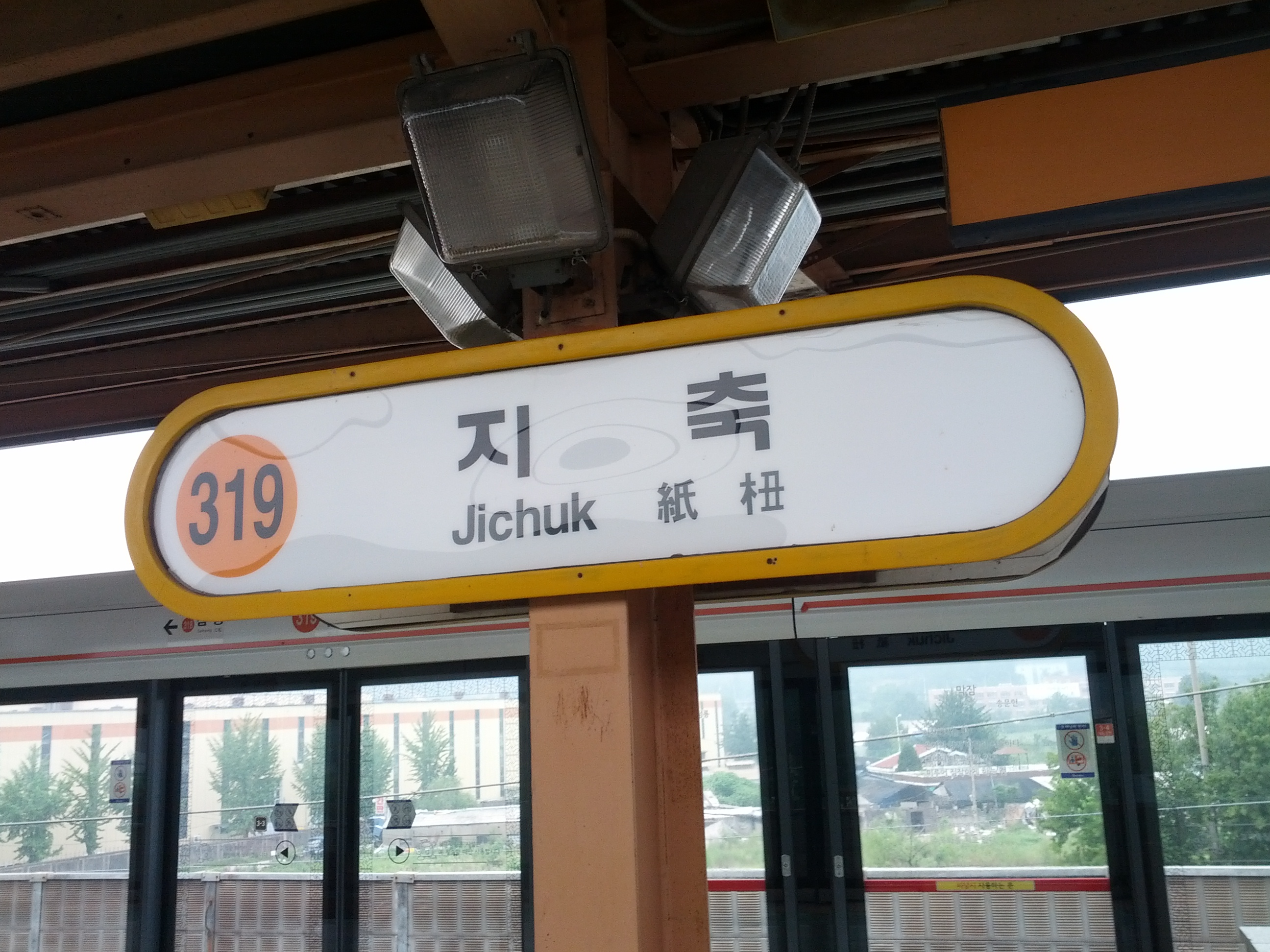

Korean name
- Hangul: 지축역
- Hanja: 紙杻驛
- Revised Romanization: Jichungnyeok
- McCune–Reischauer: Chich'ungnyŏk

General information
- Location: 818-64 Jichuk-dong, 300 Samsongno, Deogyang-gu, Goyang-si, Gyeonggi-do
- Coordinates: 37°38′53″N 126°54′50″E
- Operated by: Seoul Metro
- Line(s): Line 3
- Platforms: 1
- Tracks: 2

Construction
- Structure type: Aboveground

Key dates
- July 13, 1990: Line 3 opened

Passengers
- (Daily) Based on Jan-Dec of 2012. Line 3: 3,125

Jichuk Station is a railway station located just northwest of Seoul on Seoul Subway Line 3. It is within walking distance to Eunpyeong-gu, Seoul. Jichuk station has a subway depot for Line 3 trains nearby.

== Origin of the name ==
Jichuk Station is named after the administrative area (dong) that it is located in. The area used to belong to two villages in the Joseon period. Jijeong-ri produced paper, while Chuk-ri was famous for its bush clover. When the area became united under Goyang-gun, it was named using the first syllables of the two villages.

== Station layout ==
G	Street level	Exit

L1; Concourse	Lobby	Customer Service, Shops, Vending machines, ATMs

L3; Line 3 platform level	Side platform, doors will open on the right
L3; Line 3 platform level	Northbound	← Ilsan Line toward Daehwa (Samsong)
L3; Line 3 platform level	Southbound	Line 3 toward Ogeum (Gupabal) →
L3; Line 3 platform level	Side platform, doors will open on the right

== Passengers ==
Line	Figure						
Line	2000	2001	2002	2003	2004	2005	2006
Ilsan Line	774	725	787	811	481	524	547
Seoul Subway Line 3	2449	2537	2582	2437	2429	2593	2584

Preceding station	Seoul Metropolitan Subway	Following station
Samsong towards Daehwa	Line 3	Gupabal towards Ogeum
