= Daehwa station =

Metro station in Goyang, South Korea

| 대화; Daehwa |
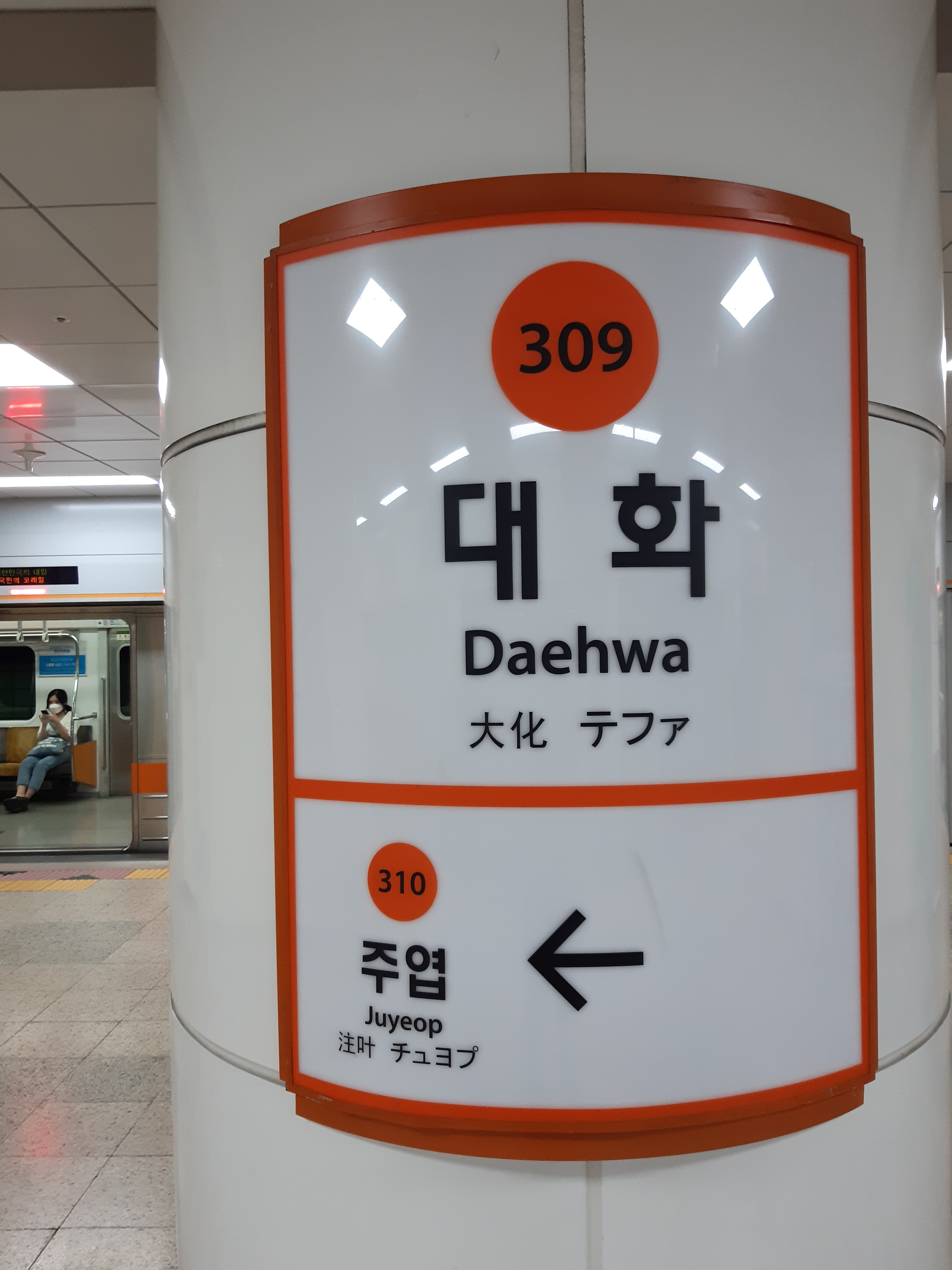

Korean name
- Hangul: 대화역
- Hanja: 大化驛
- Revised Romanization: Daehwa-yeok
- McCune–Reischauer: Taehwa-yŏk

General information
- Location: 2221 Daehwa-dong, Ilsanseo-gu, Goyang-si, Gyeonggi-do
- Coordinates: 37°40′34″N 126°44′51″E
- Operated by: Korail
- Line(s): Line 3
- Platforms: 1
- Tracks: 2
- Bus routes: 200 1000 1001 1500 M7106 M7731 8109 9700 9701 9707 9714; 10 20-1 33 33-1 56 66 70 72 75 80 88A 88B 90 92 92-1 97 150 600 900 999 760; N007 039 056(도촌) 056(서촌) 056(멱절) 057 058 059 061 062 063 082A 082B 089 090 091 095

Construction
- Structure type: Underground

Key dates
- January 30, 1996: Line 3 opened

Passengers
- (Daily) Based on Jan-Dec 2012. Line 3: 23,841

Daehwa Station (Station 309; Korean: 대화역) is an underground metro station on the Seoul Subway Line 3, operating as an extension of Line 3 of the Seoul Subway, in Daehwa-dong, Ilsanseo District, Goyang, South Korea. The station is Line 3's northwestern terminus and its 6 exits offer access to, among other places, KINTEX (750 m from Exit 1). Travel time from Daehwa to Seoul Station, changing to Line 1 at Jongno 3(sam)-ga, is 1 hour and 2 minutes, while traveling the full length of Line 3 to Ogeum takes 1 hour and 36 minutes.

== Station layout ==
| G | Street level | Exit |

| L1; Concourse | Lobby | Customer Service, Shops, Vending machines, ATMs |

| L2; Platforms | Southbound | Ilsan Line toward Ogeum (Juyeop) → |
| L2; Platforms | Island platform, doors will open on the left, right |
| L2; Platforms | Southbound | Ilsan Line toward Ogeum (Juyeop) → |

== History ==
Daehwa Station opened with the rest of the Ilsan line in 1996.

== Services ==
The first train of the day on weekdays (not including national holidays) leaves Daehwa bound for Ogeum at 5:14 a.m., while the last is at 0:36 a.m.

| Preceding station | Seoul Metropolitan Subway | Following station |
|---|---|---|
| Terminus | Line 3 | Juyeop towards Ogeum |
