= Ogeum station =

Train station in Seoul, South Korea

오금; Ogeum
오금; Ogeum
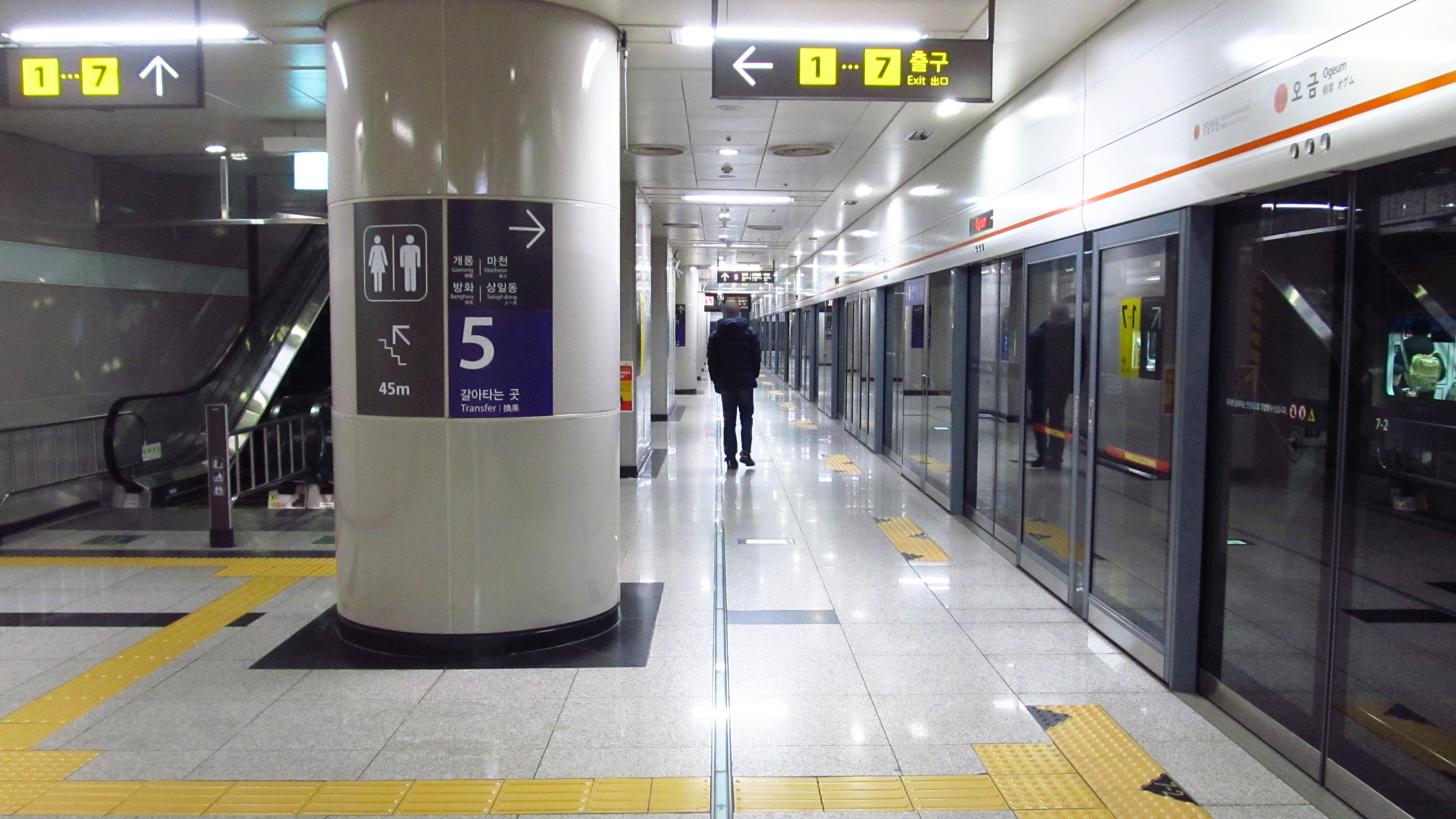
- Line 3 platform

Korean name
- Hangul: 오금역
- Hanja: 梧琴驛
- Revised Romanization: Ogeum-yeok
- McCune–Reischauer: Ogŭm-yŏk

General information
- Location: 44-2 Ogeum-dong, Songpa-gu, Seoul
- Coordinates: 37°30′07″N 127°07′41″E
- Operator: Seoul Metro
- Lines: Line 3 Line 5
- Platforms: 4
- Tracks: 4

Construction
- Structure type: Underground

Key dates
- February 18, 2010: Line 3 opened
- March 30, 1996: Line 5 opened

Passengers
- (Daily) Based on Jan-Dec of 2012. Line 3: 12,094; Line 5: 8,241

Services
Preceding station	Seoul Metropolitan Subway	Following station
National Police Hospital towards Daehwa	Line 3	Terminus
Bangi towards Banghwa	Line 5 Macheon Branch	Gaerong towards Macheon
Location

Ogeum station is a railway station on Line 3 and Line 5 of the Seoul Subway. Seoul Metro operates both Line 3 and 5 platforms. It is the southern terminus of Line 3 and travel time between Ogeum Station and Daehwa Station, the northern terminus of the line, is approximately 95 minutes.

Some scenes for the film The Bourne Legacy were filmed at the station.

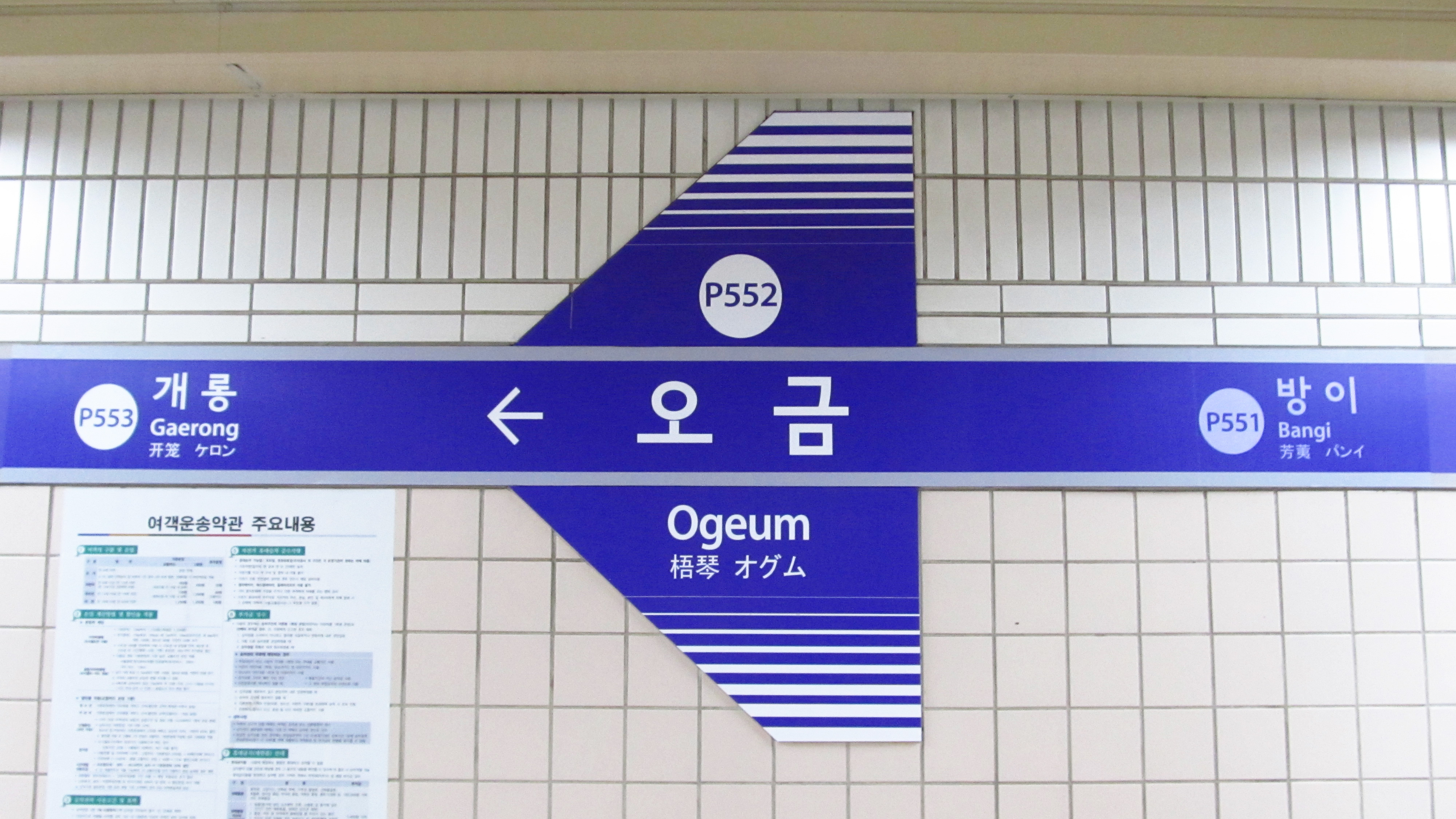
Line 5 station sign
