= History of candlelight rallies in South Korea =

In South Korea, candlelight rallies, also referred to in English as candlelight struggles, candlelight revolutions, candelights vigils or candelight protests or candlelight cultural festivals are attended with a humorous props and banners along with candles. Candlelight protests are symbolic collective gatherings of political dissent in South Korea to combat injustice peacefully. This method of protesting began in 1992 for opposing the charging of online service. After that in 2002, as a result of the Yangju highway incident, then utilized in the rallies against the impeachment of Roh Moo-hyun in 2004, re-used again in the 2008 U.S. beef protests, and emerged in the 2016–18 President Park Geun-hye protests.

== 1990's ==
=== Opposing the charging of online service ===
On September 26, 1992, the first candlelight rally happened in South Korea in 1992 when online users gathered to oppose the charging of the online service of Kotel. Until then, KETEL, a large PC communication network owned by the Korea Economic Daily, provided the service for free of charge. However, with the acquisition of Ketel by Korea PC Telecom, the company announced the payment on February 18, 1992. Although PC communication service providers did not oppose charging in general, they opposed the charging method. 100% of the charges and prepayment of credit were the same as asking Ketel users, who were mostly students at the time, to leave Ketel and close the club. In response, some 60 club acquaintances in Ketel gathered to form a standing committee and propose opposition to advance payments, payment of land, student discounts and postponement of the deadline.

However, when Korea's PC news agency unilaterally implemented the policy, the club's acquaintances fought back by shutting down the club's bulletin board. Also, Hitel users resisted by holding a candlelight vigil in front of the Korea PC Telecom building from February 24. Of course, such protests do not transform paid services into services that are free of charge, but they were meaningful in so far as they were the first event to show that online users can influence the real world by showing that netizens can protest against corporate unilateral policies. Afterwards, after forming the "club council," the opinions of the correspondents were reflected in various negotiations for three months through negotiations with the Korea PC News Agency, and the paid-in under the name of "Kotel" will begin on May 1.

After the first candlelight rally, netizens continued to influence society by going beyond online and offline on important issues through PC communications and the internet.

South Korea's candlelight rally culture originated during 1992 online service charge protests, pioneering a peaceful alternative to traditional, often violent demonstrations. These early, organized gatherings established the candle as a foundational symbol of civic dissent, laying the groundwork for future massive public protests.

== 2000's ==
=== The Yangju highway incident ===
Background

A large candlelight rally was held in Gwanghwamun, Seoul, in memory of two female students who were run over and killed by a U.S. armored vehicle in 2002. The candlelight vigil was initiated by a user with the ID "Angma" on the bulletin board of Ohmy News on November 28, 2002. The rally later turned into an anti-American rally when the assailant, the U.S. military, was found not guilty.

Demonstrations

On November 20, 2002, the U.S. military court made its first verdict of not guilty for the soldiers involved in the incident, triggering the re-emergence of images of the girls' crushed bodies being spread online after initially having been taken down out of respect of their deaths. News of this incident and the outcome of the trial was circulated through a TV documentary, which amassed an online community that viewed this incident as a "National Tragedy", resulting in nationwide candlelight vigils being held at the suggestion of a netizen in an internet cafe to collectively mourn the death of the girls. On November 30, about 30,000 Koreans gathered in Gwanghwamun for the first mass candlelight vigil to commemorate the girls and protest their injustice death as people sang the national anthem and voiced their demands. The mishandling of this case by the U.S. and the Korean government mobilized the vigils to gain momentum as they began to be held every weekend from November 2002 up until late January 2003. Following the protests, on November 27, President Bush issued a statement of apology through an American ambassador, but it was met with discontent from netizens as they sought for a direct apology from the president and for the soldiers involved in the incident to be held accountable for their roles in the incident.

Following these events, the protesters had three demands they attempted to achieve, which outlined the following:

1. that the jurisdiction of the case be handed over to the South Korean court,
2. that an amendment should be made onto the U.S.–South Korea Status of Forces Agreement to eliminate the autonomy U.S. servicemen have in evading the South Korean government and punishment, and
3. that President Bush, issues a statement of apology for the death of the middle school girls.

Some Korean media sources labeled the vigils, that continued to take place, as "anti-Americanist", while others viewed them as a platform for self-expression for the younger generation. On December 7, the netizens who were participating in one of the 43 city-wide candlelight protests in Gwanghwamun broke through the police blockade and made their way to the U.S. embassy where they persistently tried to persuade them to apologize and seek appropriate justice. The last mass vigil took place on December 14, with about 100,000 people from over 60 cities and 15 countries gathering at Gwanghwamun Square in Seoul. Revisions were made to the U.S.–South Korea Status of Forces Agreement as a result of these demonstrations.

Since the incident, candlelight vigils have become a staple protest culture in South Korea.

=== The protest against the Roh Moo-hyun president's impeachment ===
Background

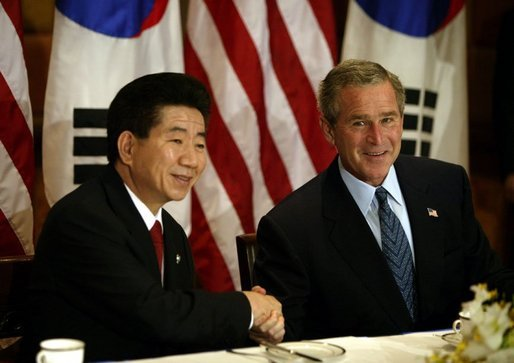
Roh and Bush meet in October 2003

On a national televised news conference in 2004, President Roh displayed no remorse over his brother's bribery scandal and instead, blamed the construction company executive involved for exploiting a "lesser educated man". The following day, Roh also expressed his support for the Uri party and refused to publicly apologize, defiantly going against the parliament's demand for one, which caused the last traces of parliament support for Roh to cease. On March 12, members of the conservative oppositional party impeached Roh on the grounds of him violating "political neutrality" when he asked the nation to support the newly established Uri party for the April 15 elections. The National Assembly stripped Roh from his role as the head of state and chief commander soon after the voting session had ended, with Prime Minister Goh Kun stepping up as the interim President of South Korea. Despite Prime Minister Goh's assurance to the public that he would maintain Roh's policies with North Korea and the United States as well as protect South Korea's economy from going into chaos, Roh's supporters met the news of impeachment with hostility, rage, and as an embarrassment to their country due to Roh being the first democratically elected leader to be impeached.

Demonstrations

Roh Moo-hyun was a president who wanted to fight authoritarianism and regionalism as president. His capital relocation plan and the announcement of a grand coalition have been altered and criticized, and his stagnant economic growth has also led to the worst approval rating ever for a president of 5 percent. And he became the first president to be impeached in the history of the Republic of Korea's constitutional history for violating the election law with calls for support of the Uri Party. But the anger is not people, Roh Moo-hyun. Many citizens gathered at the National Assembly and poured into the streets shouting "impeachment" for the impeached president, holding candles. Candles filled the streets from Gwanghwamun in Seoul to the Daehanmun Gate in Deoksugung Palace, and such rallies continued throughout the country until the Constitutional Court rejected the impeachment motion.

=== The gang rape of a middle school girl in Miryang ===
In 2004, a rape case occurred in Miryang, South Gyeongsang Province. Forty-four high school students in Miryang lured a victim from Ulsan to an online chat and raped her for a year.

A candlelight rally was gathered by the internet masses who were angry at the incident. On the 11th, at 7 pm, in front of Kyobo Book Center in Jongno-gu, Seoul, and Lotte Department Store in Seomyeon, Busan, voices condemned the victims of the "Mild Middle School Girl's Sexual Assault" case and the police's insufficient investigation.

Beginning on the 10th, internet users proposed to hold a candlelight protest under the motto of urging the police for thorough investigation, strengthening punishment for sexual assaults, and improving the social atmosphere for victims of sexual assault. Accordingly, the people gathered at the candlelight protests voluntarily, held free speeches and picket protests. They were known as voluntary gatherers through internet communities such as DC Inside and Funny University (a name of web communities).

=== Opposition to U.S. Beef Imports ===
Background

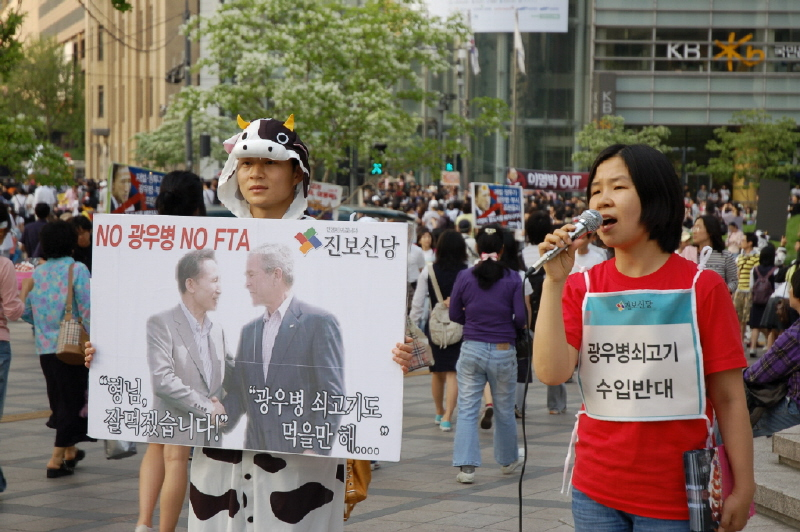
Against US beef agreement

Candlelight vigils protesting U.S. beef imports were different from before. A group of teenage girls, named Candlelight Girls, gathered in Cheonggye Plaza on May 2, 2008, to hold candles on the outcome of the negotiations, which included more than 30 months of beef imports and a ban on imports of mad cow disease in the United States. The protests, sparked by middle and high school students spread across the country for more than 100 days, with a couple millions participating, including food-conscious housewives. Spontaneous demonstrations spread widely through the internet and cell phone network finally made Lee Myung-bak drew the president of the apology.

The rally was called the Candlelight Cultural Festival, which was held in the form of a cultural festival in order to avoid violating the provisions of the Act on Assembly and Demonstration, which prohibits outdoor rallies or demonstrations after sunset. The biggest feature is that unlike before, voluntary individuals without the so-called "leading forces," or middle and high school students, and college students, office workers, and strollers, participated in the event to express their opinions nonviolently.

Demonstrations

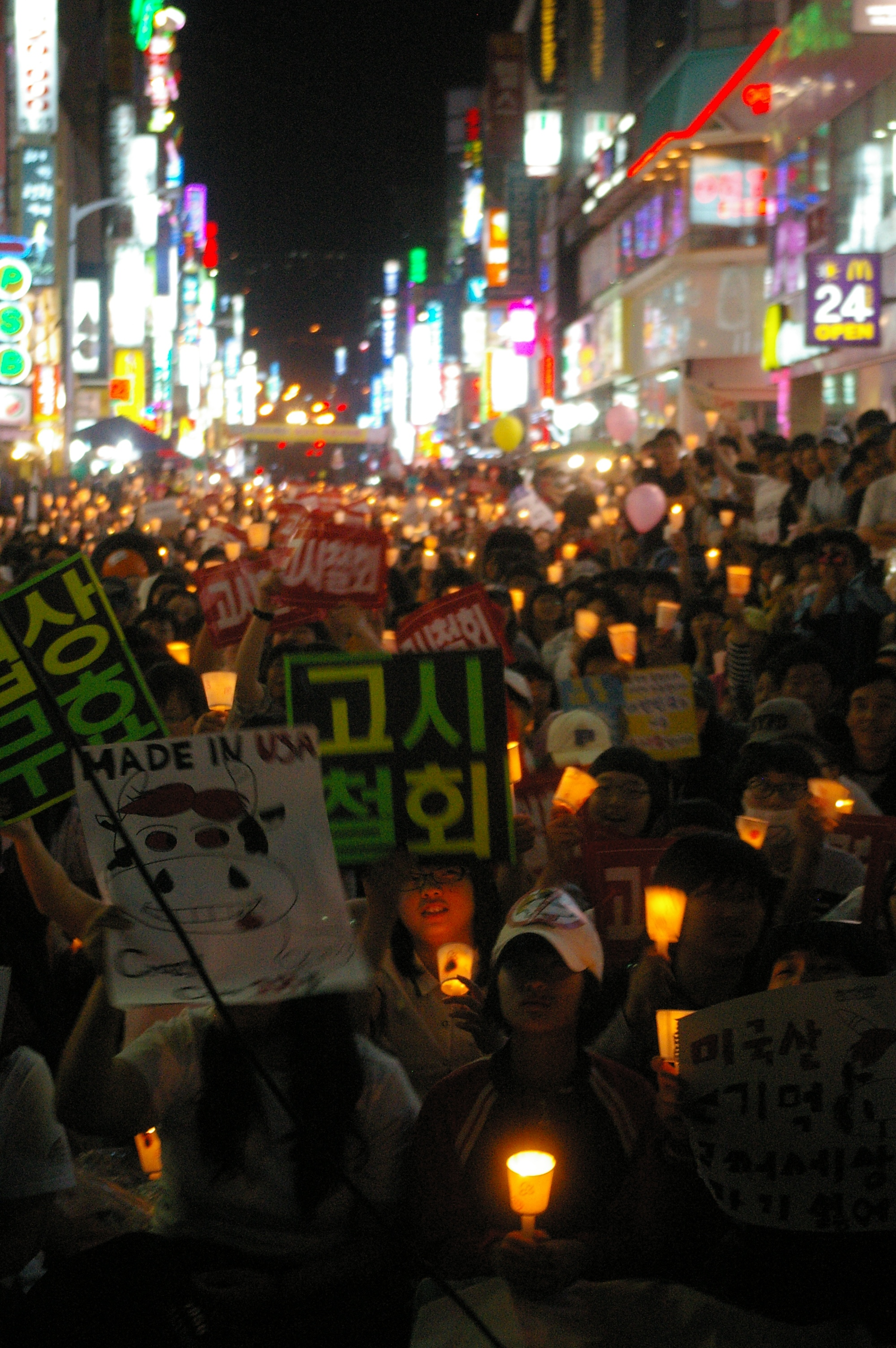
A candlelight vigil being held in Busan against the importation of U.S. beef

On May 2, 2008, the streets of Seoul were filled with hundreds of secondary and college students that orchestrated a candlelight vigil via text messages and the internet in protest of the agreement. Thereafter, the candlelight protests became a daily occurrence, with 100,000 people gathering to rally against the agreement and calling for the impeachment of President Lee, which had garnered 1.2 million signatures online on May 6. On May 22, the Korean government announced that they would attempt to exclude certain parts of U.S. beef that may be more receptive to mad cow disease as the President offered an apology for disregarding the public's health concerns, but this did not quell their grievances. Protests erupted in Busan, Chuncheon, Daegu, and Gwangju, with the end of May ushering 211 arrests on protestors for displaying political slogans and signs that the Korean government had warned against utilizing. During the third week of June, President Lee's cabinet stepped down from their position due to the enormous pressure they received from the protestors. On June 25, another agreement was discussed wherein President Lee lifted the ban on U.S. beef from cattle that were less than 30 months old. In response, a protest was organized by the People's Association Against Mad Cow Disease, leading to 91 arrests. Other protesters attempted to make their way to the president's office but were detained by police. On June 30, a wave of a new march was headed by the Korean Confederation of Trade Unions (KCTU) with hundreds of its members coming out to protest. The candlelight protests lasted from May 2008 until August 2008 and is remembered as a mass movement that emerged from the South Korean government's failure to hold the trust of the people.

== 2010's ==
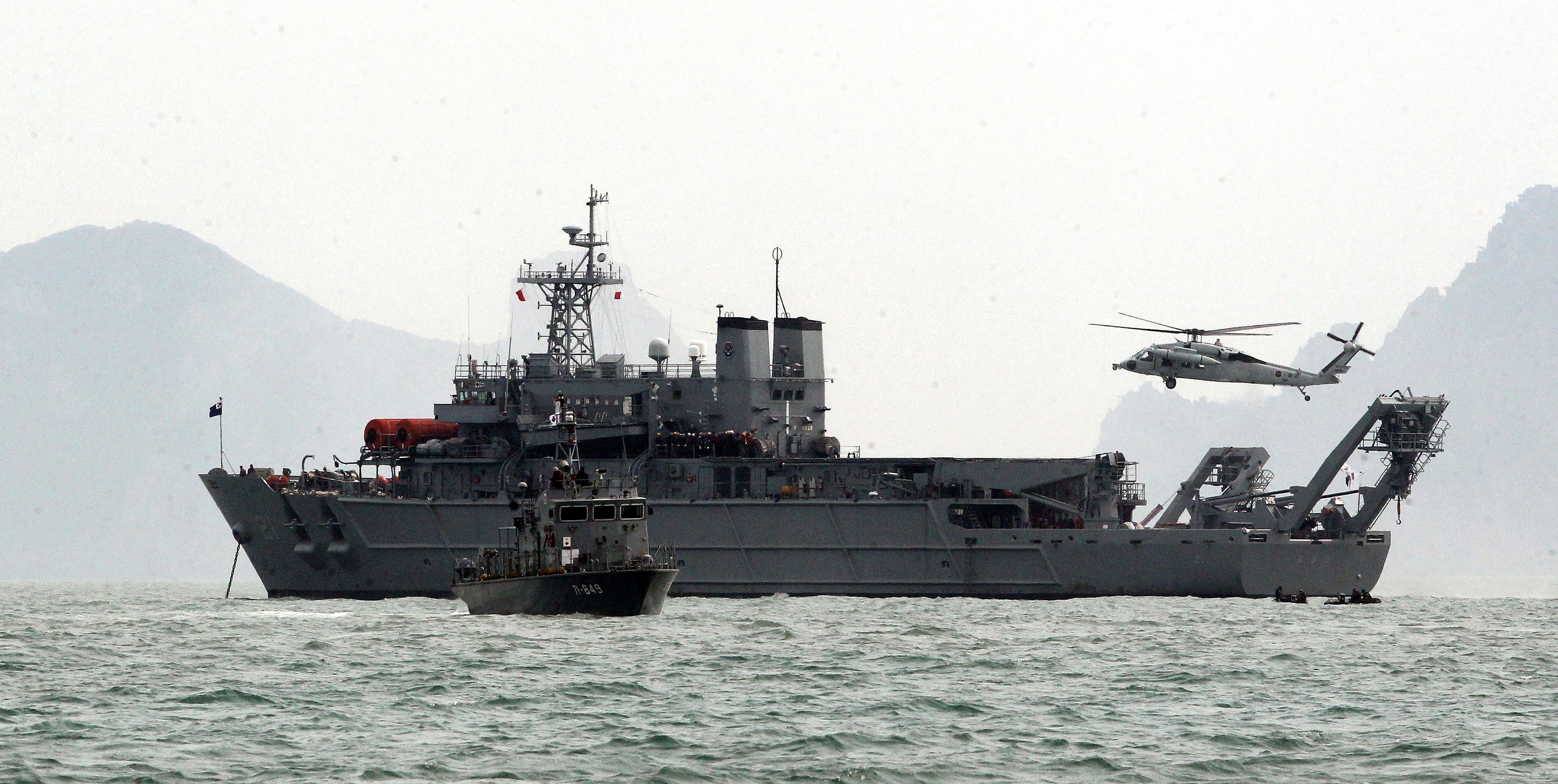
Operation to rescue Ferry Sewol

=== Sinking of MV Sewol ===
On April 16, 2014, 304 out of 476 passengers (about 250 students from Danwon High School) were killed or missing when the Incheon-Jeju Port regular passenger ship MV Sewol operated by Cheonghae Shipping Co. capsized and sank in waters near Gwanmae Island, Jindo-gun, South Jeolla Province.

On May 31, rallies and marches were held in Seoul and other major cities, including Ansan and Busan, to pay tribute to the victims of the Ferry Sewol accident and to urge them to find out the truth.

The "People's Countermeasure Meeting for the Ferry Sewol Disaster," consisting of 800 civic groups, held a candlelight vigil in memory of Ferry Sewol at 6 p.m. at Cheonggye Plaza in Seoul, with 20,000 people gathered. The candlelight vigils continued until the 23rd session until 2017.

=== Request for Park Geun-hye president's impeachment ===
Background

In September 2016, the so-called 'Park Geun-hye Choi Soon-sil Gate', which was alleged that President Park Geun-hye's secretary Choi Soon-sil intervened in the national administration, demanded the investigation of the truth about the government's farms and the resignation of President Park Geun-hye on October 29 of the same year. A candlelight rally was held. On November 12, the '2016 People's Citizens' Convention' hosted by the 'Park Geun-hye regime retirement emergency action', which was held by over 1500 civil society organizations, opened in Seoul's Gwanghwamun area, the largest of its kind, one million people (estimated by the organizers, police) The estimate was 260,000). On November 26, 1.9 million people (330,000 police officers) from all over the country participated to record the largest demonstration in the Korean constitutional history. The prosecution of President Park Geun-hye was proposed on December 3 and passed on December 9; as a result, her presidency was suspended.

However, the candlelight rally demanding President Park Geun-hye's resignation continued until the following year, and the cumulative number of participants exceeded 15 million from 9 March to the 20th candlelight rally. And on March 10, the Constitutional Court's impeachment trial unanimously cited the impeachment prosecution, so President Park Geun-hye was dismissed from the presidency and became the first president of the constitution to be retired from impeachment during his tenure. The candlelight vigil attracted the attention of the world by awakening a large number of violent citizens to conduct peaceful protests without violence, judging and driving unfair power without shedding blood.

Demonstrations

Main articles: Impeachment of Park Geun-hye and 2016–17 South Korean protests

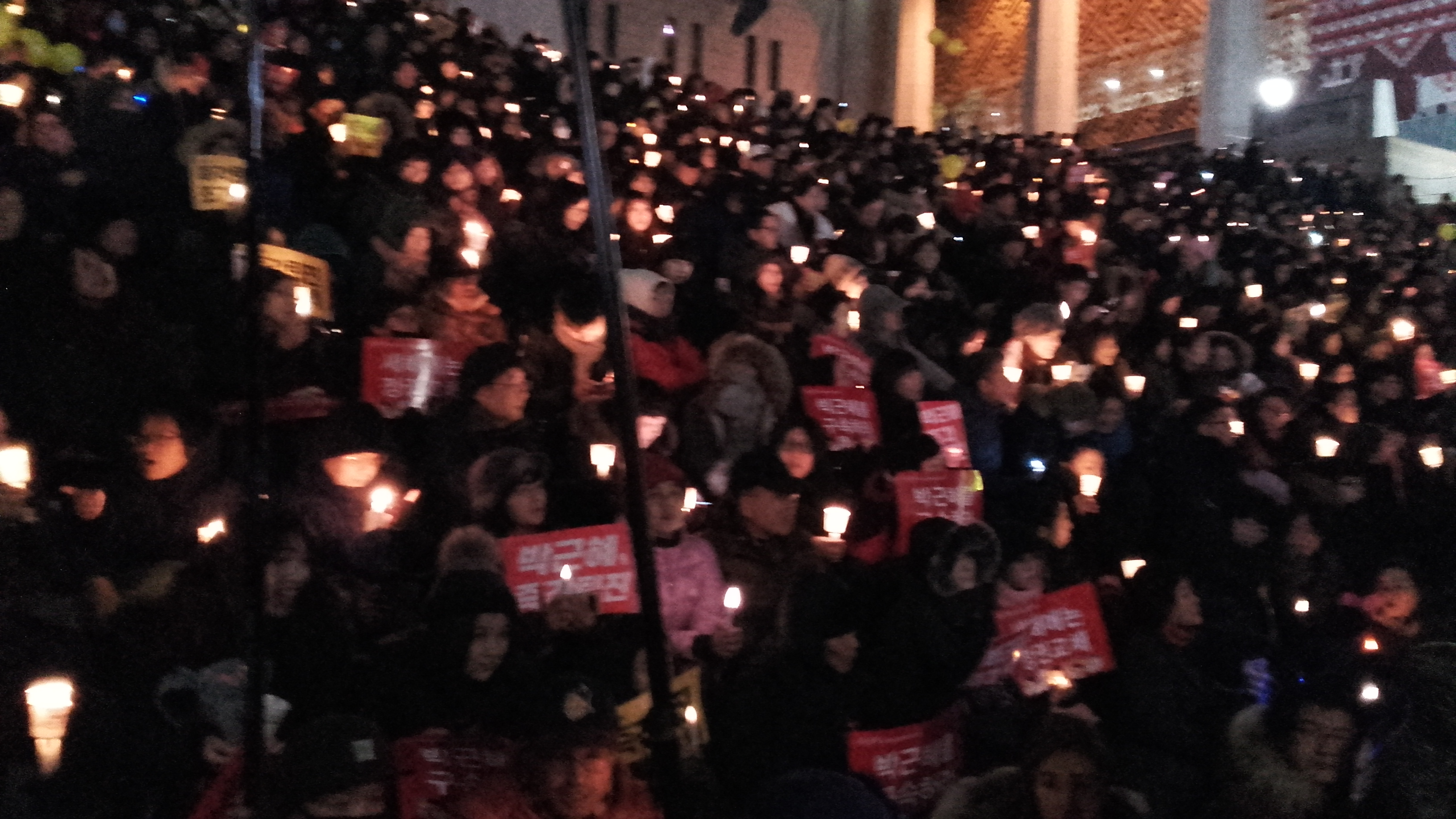
Candlelight Protest around Sejong Center at Gwanghwamun

The candlelight protests initially started in October 2016 and lasted until March 2017. The first candlelight vigil was held on October 29, shortly after the corruption scandal was disseminated through the media. The protests that were held came to be known as the Candlelight Revolution and amassed over 2 million protestors in Gwanghwamun Square in early December. The Candlelight Revolution pressured the National Assembly into processing the impeachment of Park, with the Constitutional Court approving the motion on March 11, 2017, as the rallies continued throughout the months with fervor. On February 13, 2018, Choi was sentenced to 20 years in prison for corruption and on April 6 of the same year, Park was found guilty of corruption, coercion, abuse of power, and leaking classified information, which amounted to her final sentence being a total of 24 years in prison.

=== Support the reform of the prosecution ===
September-October 2019, Prosecution Reform Candlelight Culture Festival, which was initiated by the National Citizens' Solidarity for Judicial Abolition, began on September 16, and until September 20 (1st ~ 5th) in front of the Seoul Central District Prosecutor's Office The 2nd, 3rd, 4th, 5th, September 21st (6th) rally, 6th, 7th, moved the location to the Seocho-dong Supreme Prosecutors' Office. On the 28th of September, the rally was filled with citizens about 600m from the silkworm bridge at the prosecutor's office to the intersection of Seocho Station.

October 5th (8th) 8th, October 12th (9th) 9th, Seoul Seocho-dong Seocho Station Intersection, Seoul Arts Center direction, Gyodae Station direction, Prosecutor's Office direction (Main Stage), Surreypool Tunnel direction Screens were installed in four directions. At the 8th and 9th rallies, in the direction of Seoul Arts Center (about 1km), Gyodae Station (about 500m), Surrey Full Tunnel (about 300m), and Prosecutors' Office (about 600m), about 2.4km in length, Seocho-daero and Banpo-daero Citizens are full. Citizens who participated in the cultural festival shouted for protection of the country, prosecution reform, establishment of airborne offices, and media reform.

From October 19 to December 14, 2019, the Candlelight Culture Festival of the Prosecution Reform moved from Seocho-dong to Yeouido after the resignation of the former Minister of Justice of the Fatherland. On October 19 (10th), 10th, screens were installed in the direction of Sogang Bridge and Yeouido Station (main stage). Participating citizens shouted for prosecution reform and establishment of airborne offices. From this time, through December 14th (15th), they went through the Republic of Korea Parliament House and marched to the Liberal Party.

On October 26 (11th), the 11th moved to Yeouido-daero (near Yeouido Park), and a request for special prosecutorial documents was issued along with requests for the establishment of a prosecutor's reform airlift. The same was done on 2 November 2nd (12th). Then, after resting for about 4 weeks, on the 30th of November 30th (13th), they held a rally under the title of the Prosecution Reform National Assembly. The location has changed slightly.

And on 7 December (the 14th), the 14th political prosecutor dismantled and a picket called fast track investigation also appeared. The seat was moved to the 11th and 12th locations. On December 15 (15th), the 15th moved to the 10th venue and held the last rally.

It was only an act of citizens who gathered opinions by holding candles, but without much progress or remuneration, many people participated in the rally. It was an ambassador with a historical significance in the world in that it made the move, prosecuted the impeachment of the president, dismissed after approval, and even elected a new president.
