= Choi Jongcheon =

South Korean poet (1954–2025)

Choi Jongcheon (Korean: 최종천; 1954 – 18 July 2025) was a South Korean poet. He is regarded as one of the foremost labor poets of South Korea, along with Park Nohae and Baek Mu-san. His poetry combines his personal experiences of labor with philosophical reflections to offer a critique of contemporary capitalistic society.

== Background ==
Choi was born in Jangseong, Jeollanam-do (or South Jeolla Province) in 1954. After graduating from middle school he moved to Seoul. In the early 1970s, he started working as a welder. Unlike other poets who learned about poetry through formal education, Choi said his forays into poetry began from doodles and scribbling. Some of the poems in his first collection Nunmuleun pureuda (눈물은 푸르다, Tears are Blue, 2002), for instance "Koseumoseu seom (코스모스 섬, Cosmos Island)" and "Mihonmo (미혼모, Single Mother)", started out as scribbles jotted down in his childhood notebooks. Choi's boss, a college graduate, happened to see his notebook one day and was the first person to tell him about the existence of 'poetry'. He encouraged Choi to try writing poems himself. Choi worked as a delivery person for a Chinese restaurant sometimes and would collect literary magazines from the piles he found left out on the stairs of the Hyundae Sihak magazine offices in Chungjeongno. He read these in his spare time, but never attended a writing class. After seeing a notice at the classical music cafe Renaissance, he joined his first amateur literary writing group and began composing poetry. He debuted in the late 1980s when his poems were published in the 1986 and 1988 issues of Segyeui munhak.

After becoming a published poet, Choi continued to read poetry but not literary journals. His preferred reading was philosophy and biology. He considered his poetry to be a critique of humans; in lamenting the reality of capitalism's odious effects, he believed one can achieve a truer awareness of the self. His poetry prizes physical labor over white-collar labor, which he perceived as work that deals with symbols. Chou's work focused on the intricate relations of labor, humans, and culture. He was the recipient of the Shin Dongyup Writing Prize (2002) and the Oh Janghwan Literature Prize (2012).

Choi died of a cerebral infarction at the age of 71 on 18 July 2025.

== Writing ==
=== Relationship between labor and art ===
Being a labor poet, Choi Jongcheon's poetry offer deep reflections about the relationship between labor and art. He was known for his ability to discern and describe artistry in the labor process and the sites in which these occur, and was often referred to as "a poet who bridges art and labor".

His first collection of poetry, Nunmuleun pureuda was published in 2002, sixteen years after his debut. In one of the poems in the collection, "Buran mueosinga (부란 무엇인가 What is Wealth?)", Choi addressed the ways in which he was perceived as an anomaly for being a poetry-writing laborer, and criticizes the social reality that enforces the alienation of labor from culture. This critical stance continues in the 2007 collection Naeui bapgeureusi binnanda (나의 밥그릇이 빛난다, My Rice-bowl Shines) as he calls to task the falsehood or fabricated nature of symbols. In "Naneun sobidoenda (나는 소비된다, I am Consumed)" he exposes the vanity of those who make use of (and name-drop) the collected works of Hegel or Beethoven as empty symbols to be consumed.

Choi Jongcheon was relentless in his critique of the disparity between labor and art, which is not to say he dismissed or negated culture and the arts. True art, as he saw it, is only possible when the distance between labor and art is bridged, for it is, in the truest sense of liberated labor, itself labor.

=== Labor as liberation ===
For the labor poet Choi Jongcheon, there are two broad categories of labor: labor as miserable or wretched reality and labor as true liberation. Based on his own experiences as a welder, the poor working conditions and environments of laborers are a recurring subject in his poetry. In "Chulgeun – jigak (출근 – 지각 Clock-in – Late Arrival)", a poem collected in Nunmuleun pureuda, Choi depicts the cumulative effects of fatigue and hard labor on the mind and body through descriptions of colleagues who work through the graveyard shift even as they are ill. But Choi does not only write exposés of labor conditions. The importance of labor's power to liberate mankind is stressed throughout. The labor class is "the true priesthood" for Choi, just as the ideology of the working class is "the ultimate philosophy and religion" and the only means of "bringing Man back to life".

In Goyangiui masul (고양이의 마술, Cat's Magic, 2011), Choi champions the value of labor especially in contrast to corrupt capital. Labor is the foundation that sustains the world ("Mangchiege <망치에게 To Hammer>", and it is through the liberation of labor that the harmful abuses of capital can be thwarted and its effects healed ("Eotteoke dareulkka <어떻게 다를까 How Does It Differ?>). Further, true liberation of and through labor is to ensure labor itself becomes art that is freeing, and freely undertaken (Insaengeun jjalgo gigyeneun yeongwonhada <인생은 짧고 기계는 영원하다 Life is Brief, Machines are Forever, 2018>). How far these claims lie from a subjective labor- and laborer-centrism is a matter for debate. But what is certain is that labor as liberation as espoused by Choi Jongcheon's poetry is without doubt an urgent literary topic for the 21st century, as evidenced by discussions of the exigencies brought about by "the end of work".

== Works ==
=== Poetry collections ===
Nunmuleun pureuda (눈물은 푸르다 Tears are Blue), Siwa sihaksa, 2002

Naeui bapgeureusi binnanda (나의 밥그릇이 빛난다 My Rice-bowl Shines), Changbi, 2007

Goyangiui masul (고양이의 마술 Cat's Magic), Silcheon munhaksa, 2011

Yongjeopui si (용접의 시 The Poem of Welding), Zmanz, 2013

Insaengeun jjalgo gigyeneun yeongwonhada (인생은 짧고 기계는 영원하다 Life is Brief, Machines are Forever), Bangeoreum, 2018

=== Essay collection ===
Nodonggwa yesul (노동과 예술 Labor and Art), Pureun sasang, 2013

=== Awards ===
2002 Shin Dongyup Writing Prize

2012 Oh Janghwan Literature Prize (for Goyangiui masul)
