= Kim Jong Il (disambiguation) =

Kim Jong-Il (1941 or 1942-2011) was the second leader of North Korea from 1994 to 2011.

Kim Jong-Il may also refer to:

- Kim Jong Il (1941 or 1942–2011), North Korean dictator
- Kim Jong-il (long jumper) (born 1962), South Korean athlete
- Kim Jung-il (writer) (born 1977), South Korean poet
