= Yim Chol-kyu =

Korean literary scholar

- Hangul: 임철규
- Hanja: 林喆規
- RR: Im Cheolgyu
- MR: Im Ch'ŏlgyu

Yim Chol-kyu (Korean pronunciation: [im.tɕʰʌl.ɡju]) is a literary scholar and emeritus professor of Yonsei University in Seoul, South Korea.

Born in Changnyeong County, South Gyeongsang Province, Yim graduated from Yonsei University, after which he completed his doctoral degree at Indiana University, Bloominton. He returned to teach English Literature at Yonsei University in 1976 until his retirement in 2004. During his tenure, he was heralded as one of Korea's foremost scholars of literary criticism and analysis, especially in the fields of classical literature and critical theory. Following his retirement he has focused on encouraging emerging scholarship as well as continuing literary research. In 2018, he completed the seven volume series Selected Volumes by Yim Chol Kyu (임철규 저작집), in which he presents his ongoing engagement with questions of literature, politics, and ideologies.

== Life ==
Yim was born in 1939 in South Korea, during the tail end of Japanese occupation in Korea. He completed his undergraduate degree in English Literature at Yonsei University. Inspired by an interest in classical literature, he received his MA in classics from Indiana University. In 1975, he received a PhD in Comparative Literature from the same university and returned to Yonsei to teach English Literature from 1976. His tenure at Yonsei lasted until 2004, after which he retained emeritus professorship.

Yim cites among his influences classical (Greco-Roman) literature but also the theoretical framework of Northrop Fry, and in particular Anatomy of Criticism, which Yim himself translated into Korean later on in his career. Early on in his career, Yim established himself as a progressive scholar when in 1980s he co-signed a declaration against military dictatorship in South Korea along with 134 other intellectuals. Realism in Our Age (우리시대의 리얼리즘), one of his early books, demonstrates an interest in the interaction between literature and social reality that would come to characterize his academic works to follow. Realism in Our Age and Why Utopia (왜 유토피아인가), were the only two books revised as part of Yim's magnum opus collection published after his retirement, and shows clearly Yim's interest in literature not simply as a cultural product, but also as a way of social engagement. Why Utopia, which was originally published in 1994, was published almost a decade after the fall of the Soviet Union. This project was undertaken in response to the academic sphere's reaction to the fall of the last socialist state. At a time when it was common to either denounce or eulogize Marxism, Yim's discussion of class inequality, alienation, and the contradictions of capitalism demonstrate what he himself calls the “absurdity” of announcing the end of Marxism. For Yim, these problems still persist to this day, and as such Why Utopia? seeks to answer the very question it poses, outlining the necessity of imagining and making a better society.

While Yim is best known as a literary scholar specializing in Anglophone literature, he did not let go of his interest in the reality of South Korean society and contemporary Korean writers. In the revised edition of Why Utopia published a decade after its original publication, he includes a full- fledged analysis of Korean literary works such as Park No-hae’s prison poetry, and Hwang Seok-young's Jang Gil-san (장길산) as representative works that synthesize Marxist ideals with a critique of contemporary capitalist society. Towards the latter end of his career as well as after retirement, he published more prolifically on South Korean literature and devoted himself to extensive research drawing Western critical approaches to South Korean literature of the modern and contemporary era. Following his retirement in 2004 he donated 2,500 books to the Yonsei University Library. These books range from critical volumes to major literary texts that he collected over the course of his time at Yonsei, and are now a permanent part of the library's collection of donated texts.

== Work ==
Yim's work spans several decades, and as such he has made significant contributions to the field of Anglophone literary studies, which was an emerging field in South Korea in the late 70s and 80s when Yim started his career. His most significant collection of works is the seven-book series he began publishing in 2004 following his retirement. Beginning with History of the Eye, Aesthetics of the Eye (눈의 역사 눈의 미학), Yim tackles and presents his response to questions that have long since plagued philosophers and literary scholars alike. In particular, Yim returns to his origins, turning to Greco-Roman classics such as the Iliad in search of answers to the question of humanity and history. With Why Utopia and Realism in Our Age, he circles back to the texts he published earlier on in his career, presenting an updated understanding of the intersection between literature, theory, and modern society. In an interview at the end of the revised edition of Realism in Our Age, he laments that while there is a need to be wary of the proximity to Western Nationalism, there is also a need for South Koreans to establish a national literature following the experience of political oppression and the subsequent disconnect to ideological traditions.

In his book Return (귀환), he examines the theme of nostoi, or ‘return home.’ Yim demonstrates here his interest in South Korean media studies, analyzing films such as Lee Chang-dong's Secret Sunshine (밀양) as well as Park Kyung-ri's epic novel Land (토지). Of Land, he focuses significantly on the theme of the individual vs. history, analyzing how the painful history of a collective of individuals unfolds against the backdrop of historical events that often shape individual histories as well as collective. In particular, in Death (죽음), the second to the last volume in his collection, he grapples with some of the heavier questions befitting of a humanities scholar, namely the relationship between life, humanity, and death. For instance, he speaks of his childhood experience seeing the corpses of partisan fighters during the Korean War, and how this trauma informed his conception of humanity and human relation. In this book he also expands on the relationship between literature and modernity that he presents throughout his earlier works, examining topics such as philosophical attitudes towards suicide, Freud's death drive as represented in literature and mythology, and the true meaning of death as seen through psychoanalysis.

The final volume in this series, Classics: A Genealogy of Humanity (고전: 인간의 계보학), is one that is of personal significance to himself as well. In his author biography included in that particular volume, Yim lists his birth date for the first time in his career. According to him, this is an attempt at breaking boundaries, in particular what he views as the reluctance among older scholars to publish past the age of 60. In Classics, Yim offers one of the most comprehensive views of literature within the scope of Korean academia, sweeping through Homer and Shakespeare to more contemporary works and modern Korean literature. Classics deals with heavy hitting texts within the literary canon such as Shakespeare's Romeo and Juliet, Dostoevsky's The Brothers Karamazov, and Kafka's Metamorphosis. Yim cites from Adorno, maintaining that “great literature looks at humans from the perspective of salvation”, and examines how structural contradictions of class inequality relate to questions of hope and salvation, for example, in the case of Alyosha from The Brothers Karamazov. Yim's summarization of literature in this book is as an expression of grief or mourning. He posits also that his personal background as a South Korean who grew up during a period of great national mourning, and as somehow who experienced the tragedy of war, affords him a perspective that few have within academia.

== Publications ==
=== Translations ===
- Formalism and Marxism (형식주의와 마르크스주의, 1980)
- Anatomy of Criticism (비평의 해부, 1982)
- Historical Psychology (역사심리학, 1983)
- Seven Theories of Human Nature (인간의 본질에 관한 일곱 가지 이론, 1983)
- Individual and State in Ancient China (중국에서의 개인과 국가, 1983)
- Kafka and the Marxists (카프카와 마르크스주의자들, 1986)
- Conversations Between Literature and Art (문학과 미술의 대화, 1986)
- 15 Representative Modern Plays: British and American, 1985
- 11 Representative Contemporary Plays: British and American II, 1985
- 20 Representative Modern Plays: British and American, 1988 (rev., ed.)

=== Selected volumes by Yim Chol Kyu (임철규 저작집) ===
- Vol. 1. History of the Eye, Aesthetics of the Eye (1권: 눈의 역사 눈의 미학, 2004)
- Vol. 2. Greek Tragedy: Songs of mourning for Humanity and History (2권 그리스 비극, 2007)
- Vol. 3. Realism in Our Age (3권 우리시대의 리얼리즘, 2009)
- Vol. 4. Why Utopia (4권 왜 유토피아인가, 2009)
- Vol. 5. Return (5권 귀환, 2009)
- Vol. 6. Death (6권 죽음, 2012)
- Vol. 7. Classics: A genealogy of Humanity (7권 고전: 인간의 계보학, 2016)
