= Human Rights and Transnational Democracy in South Korea =

2022 non-fiction book by Ingu Hwang

- Author: Ingu Hwang
- Publisher: University of Pennsylvania Press
- Publication date: 2022
- Pages: 360

Human Rights and Transnational Democracy in South Korea is a non-fiction book about human rights and the pro-democracy movement in the 1970s and 1980s in South Korea. Written by Ingu Hwang, it was published in 2022 by the University of Pennsylvania Press as part of their Pennsylvania Studies in Human Rights series.

== General references ==
- Baik, Tae-Ung (September 2024). "Human Rights and Transnational Democracy in South Korea. By Ingu Hwang. Philadelphia: University of Pennsylvania Press, 2022. 360p. $55.00 cloth". Perspectives on Politics. 22 (3): 939–940. doi:10.1017/S1537592724000549. ISSN 1537-5927.
- Engel, Benjamin A. (2023). "Human Rights and Transnational Democracy in South Korea by Ingu Hwang (review)". Korean Studies. 47 (1): 419–421. ISSN 1529-1529.
- Shorrock, Tim (2023-10-02). "Human rights and transnational democracy in South Korea Human rights and transnational democracy in South Korea , by Ingu Hwang, University of Pennsylvania Press, 2022, 360 pp., US$55.00 (hardback/eBook)". Asian Studies Review. 47 (4): 873–875. doi:10.1080/10357823.2023.2169034. ISSN 1035-7823.
