= Seoul University =

Seoul University most often refers to:

- Seoul National University

Seoul University may also refer to:

- University of Seoul
- Seoul National University of Science and Technology
- Seoul National University of Education
