= Nambu Bus Terminal station =

Train station in Seoul, South Korea

남부터미널 (예술의전당); Nambu Bus Terminal (Seoul Arts Center)
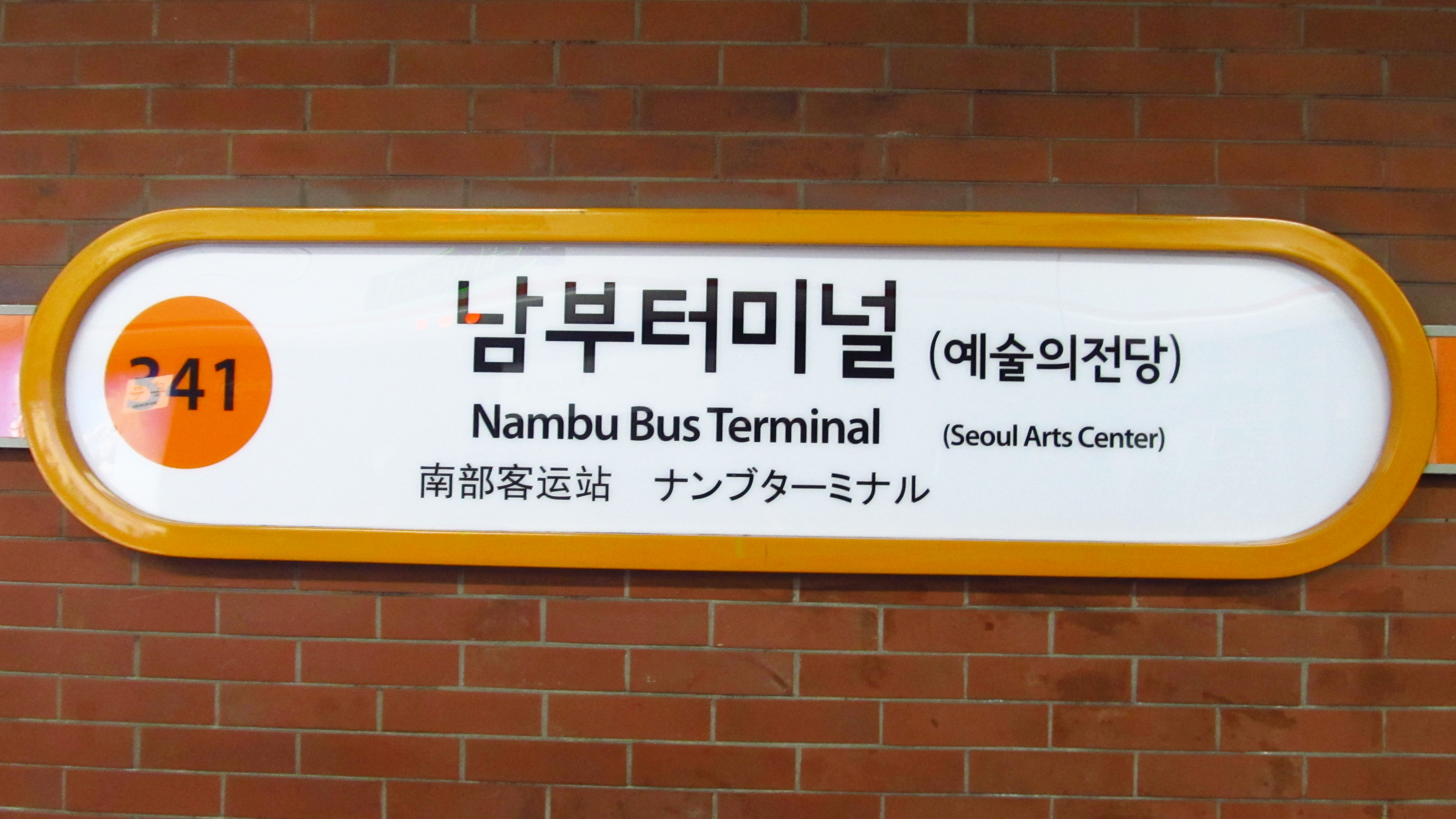

Korean name
- Hangul: 남부터미널역
- Hanja: 南部터미널驛
- Revised Romanization: Nambuteomineollyeok
- McCune–Reischauer: Nambut'ŏminŏllyŏk

General information
- Location: 31 Seochojungang-ro, 1446-1 Seocho 3-dong, Seocho-gu, Seoul
- Coordinates: 37°29′06″N 127°00′58″E
- Operated by: Seoul Metro
- Line(s): Line 3
- Platforms: 2
- Tracks: 2

Construction
- Structure type: Underground

Key dates
- October 18, 1985: Line 3 opened

Passengers
- (Daily) Based on Jan-Dec of 2012. Line 3: 73,582

Nambu Bus Terminal Station is a subway station on the Seoul Subway Line 3 in Seocho-gu, Seoul. Its substation name is Seoul Arts Center. As its name indicates, it serves the nearby Nambu Bus Terminal. It is also the closest station to the Seoul Arts Center, located about a half-mile southwest of here. When this line opened, this station was called the Cargo Truck Terminal.

== Station layout ==
G	Street level	Exit

L1; Concourse	Lobby	Customer Service, Shops, Vending machines, ATMs

L2; Platform	Side platform, doors will open on the right
L2; Platform	Northbound	← Line 3 toward Daehwa (Seoul Nat'l Univ. of Education)
L2; Platform	Southbound	Line 3 toward Ogeum (Yangjae) →
L2; Platform	Side platform, doors will open on the left

== Vicinity ==
- Exit 1 : Seoul National University of Education
- Exit 2 :
- Exit 3 : International Electronics Centre
- Exit 4 :
- Exit 5 : Nambu Bus Terminal, Seoul Arts Center
- Exit 6 :

Preceding station	Seoul Metropolitan Subway	Following station
Seoul National University of Education towards Daehwa	Line 3	Yangjae towards Ogeum
