= Eun Hwan Bai =

South Korean violinist

Eun-Hwan Bai (Korean: 배은환; born March 21, 1961) is a South Korean violinist, violist and professor from Seoul. He has received his bachelor's, master's, and doctoral degrees in violin and viola from The Juilliard School.

Bai has received instruction under Dorothy DeLay, William Lincer, Eudice Shapiro, George Kast and Ruggiero Ricci and has taught at Konkuk University and Eastern Kentucky University. Specializing in the complete unaccompanied works of Bach's Sonatas and Partitas, Paganini's Caprices, and Ysaye's Sonatas, Bai has performed in New York and Korea as a soloist as well as Los Angeles and South America as the director of Del Gesu Strings. He has also performed on live broadcast channels CTS and KBS. In South Korea, he has performed with the KBS Symphony Orchestra and completed a yearlong solo concert series in Seocho-dong. He is currently publishing an instructional book on his "High-Tech Exercises" in Seoul based on his personal methods and lectures.
