= Kim Jung-il (writer) =

South Korean poet (born 1977)

Kim Jung-il (Korean: 김중일; born 1977) is a South Korean poet.

== Life ==
Kim Jung-il was an engineering student who had entered Dankook University's faculty of engineering in 1996. When he had just come into university, he came across and read poetry collections displayed in the student society room. They were mainly collections of labor poetry, including Park Nohae's Nodongui saebyeok (노동의 새벽 The Dawn of Labor). He was immediately able to understand it because the poetry had almost no metaphorical devices, and was written in an honest, and passionate language. Kim Jung-il spent much of his childhood and adolescence near Seoul's Guro Industrial Complex, and this experience during his youth has had a large influence on his poetry work. In 2002 he began his literary career by winning the Dong-A Daily New Writer's Contest in poetry. He has published poetry collections Gukgyeongkkotjib (국경꽃집 The Border Florist), Amuteun ssi mi-anhaeyo (아무튼 씨 미안해요 I'm Sorry Mr. Anyways), and Naega salagal aram (내가 살아갈 사람 The Person I Will Live As). He has won the 30th Sin Dong-yup Prize for Literature in 2012, and the 3rd Kim Gu-yong Poetry Award in 2013.

== Writing ==
Kim Jung-il has drawn much attention due to his unique poetry where sensual language and fantastic imagery is mixed. In his debut work from 2002 Dong-A Daily New Writer's Contest, he connected different images to each other, showing his style of expanding a new meaning, as well as showing his will to use such breaks to shockingly reveal the truths of life. Rather than recreating reality, he uses solid metaphors to depict dramatic situations, telling stories that feel fantastic. However, his rich imagination that freely leaps across reality and fantasy, isn't limited to poetic experiments. This is because his poetic imagination is in fact rooted in thorough consciousness against the oppression and violence that society or history exerts on individuals. For example, his most recent poetry collection, Naega salagal aram (내가 살아갈 사람 The Person I Will Live As), is full of works that ask the question 'what is the truth' to the world. As he soberly perceives our history as a reality full of contradictions blotted by 'the history of false tears', he also resolves to "never forget what shouldn't be forgotten", and sincerely expresses his desire to send "the only book that people who have already passed can borrow through the mind", to "people who have lived before me", and "the person that I will live as". In other words, his works are full of inquiry into the possibility and the means for which poetry and politics can meet.

== Works ==
=== Poetry collections ===
- Gukgyeongkkotjib (국경꽃집 The Border Florist), Changbi, 2007.
- Amuteun ssi mi-anhaeyo (아무튼 씨 미안해요 I'm Sorry Mr. Anyways), Changbi, 2012.
- Naega salagal aram (내가 살아갈 사람 The Person I Will Live As), Changbi, 2015.

== Awards ==
- 2012 30th Sin Dong-yup Prize for Literature.
- 2013 3rd Kim Gu-yong Poetry Award.
