= South Korean Socialist Workers' Alliance =

South Korean political organisation (1989–1992)

South Korean Socialist Workers' Alliance 남한사회주의노동자동맹
- Abbreviation: Sanomaeng
- Leader: Baik Tae-ung; Park Roh-hae
- Founded: November 12, 1989
- Dissolved: 29 April 1992
- Ideology: Socialism; Marxism
- Political position: Left-wing to Far-left

The South Korean Socialist Workers' Alliance (SKSWA; Korean: 남한사회주의노동자동맹), or Sanomaeng (Korean: 사노맹) for short, was a South Korean socialist political organisation.

== History ==
Officially launched on 12 November 1989, the organisation was led by Baik Tae-ung and poet Park Roh-hae. The organisation didn't last long, as Park was detained on 10 March 1991, and after the other committee members were arrested, it was officially disbanded by 29 April 1992. The organisation was also one of the largest socialist organisations after the Korean War.

== Political aims ==
- To abolish military dictatorship and build a democratic country
- Transform the country into a socialist state
- Build a left-wing pro-labour political party

== Notable figures ==
- Baik Tae-ung
- Park Nohae
- Rhyu Si-min
- Eun Soo-mi
- Cho Kuk

== See also ==
- Minjungminju-wing (in Korean)
- Socialism in South Korea
