= Bangbae station =

Station of the Seoul Metropolitan Subway

Coordinates: 37°28′53″N 126°59′52″E

방배 (백석예술대); Bangbae (Baekseok Arts Univ.)
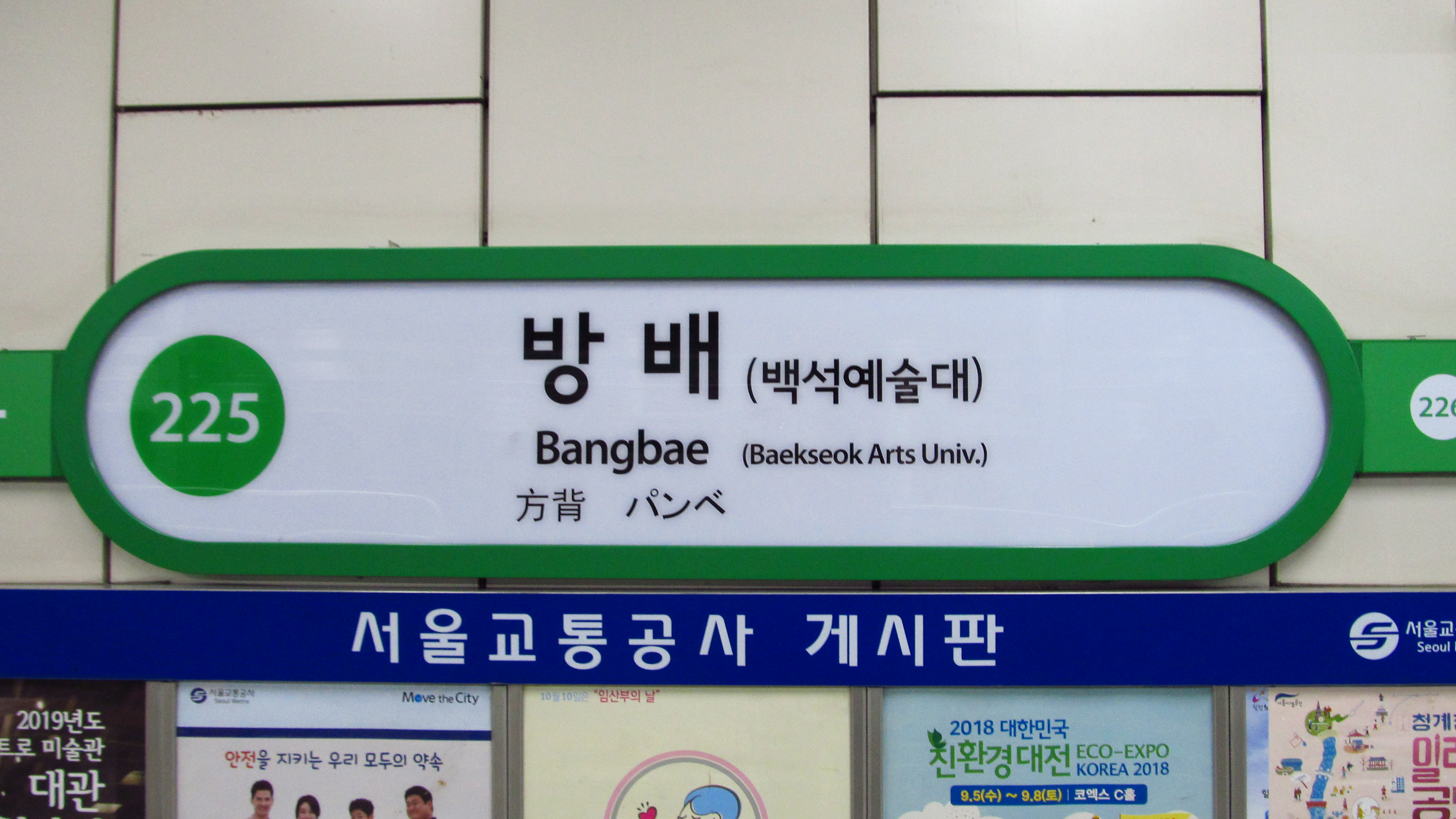
- Station sign

Korean name
- Hangul: 방배역
- Hanja: 方背驛
- RR: Bangbae-yeok
- MR: Pangbae-yŏk

General information
- Location: 80 Bangbaero Jiha, 912-14 Bangbae-dong, Seocho-gu, Seoul
- Operator: Seoul Metro
- Line: Line 2
- Platforms: 2
- Tracks: 2

Construction
- Structure type: Underground

History
- Opened: December 17, 1983

Passengers
- (Daily) Based on Jan-Dec of 2012. Line 2: 44,124

Services
Preceding station	Seoul Metropolitan Subway	Following station
Seocho Next counterclockwise	Line 2	Sadang Next clockwise
Location

Bangbae station (Korean: 방배; Hanja: 方背), which has the subname Baekseok Arts University (Korean: 백석예술대), is a subway station on the Line 2 of the Seoul Metropolitan Subway. The station is located in the Bangbae neighborhood of Seocho District, Seoul. The tomb of Grand Prince Hyoryeong (Korean: 효령대군), the second son of King Taejong—the third monarch of the Joseon Dynasty—is located to the northeast.

== Station layout ==
G	Street level	Exit

L1; Concourse	Lobby	Customer Service, Shops, Vending machines, ATMs

L2; Platform level	Side platform, doors will open on the right
L2; Platform level	Inner circle	← Line 2 Next clockwise (Sadang)
L2; Platform level	Outer circle	Line 2 Next counterclockwise (Seocho) →
L2; Platform level	Side platform, doors will open on the right

== Vicinity ==
- Exit 1: Sangmun High School, Sindonga APT
- Exit 2: Daewoo Hyoryeong APT
- Exit 3: Isu Middle School
- Exit 4: Tomb of Grand Prince Hyoryeong, Bangil Elementary School
