= Baek Mu-san =

South Korean poet and labor activist (born 1955)

- Hangul: 백봉석
- RR: Baek Bongseok
- MR: Paek Pongsŏk

Pen name
- Hangul: 백무산
- RR: Baek Musan
- MR: Paek Musan

Baek Musan (Korean: 백무산; born 1955) is a South Korean poet and labor activist.

== Life ==
Baek Mu-san was born in 1955 in Yeongcheon, North Gyeongsang Province, South Korea. His birth name is Baek Bong-seok (백봉석). In 1974 he began working as a laborer at Hyundai Heavy Industries, and then in 1984 he started his literary career as he published "Ji-okseon" (지옥선 Hell Boat) in the first volume of Minjungsi (민중시 The People's Poem). He was the editor of Nodong Haebang Munhak (노동해방문학 Labor Liberation Literature), and he has been arrested in 1992 for violation of national security law. Since his debut in 1984, Baek Mu-san received much attention as a writer who had been a conglomerate factory worker. He is seen as one of the poets that represent 1980s labor poetry along with Park Nohae.

Particularly, for his poetry collection Dongteuneun Mipomanui Saebyeokeul Ditgo (동트는 미포만의 새벽을 딛고 Stepping Upon the Early Morning of Mipo Bay at Dawn) (Nodong Munhaksa, 1990), he received much attention by writing the Ulsan Hyundai Heavy Industries full scale strike that occurred for 4 months from late 1988 and early 1989 into a one long poem. It was also seen as having directly expressed the fight of the labor class, announcing for 'gaining power for the labor class through political organization. Baek Mu-san was active constantly after the 1990s as well, widening his scope of interest from living conditions of laborers to criticizing the root of the violent nature of capital and environmental problems, writing poetry that delves into the causes of human existence that has overcome capital's value. For his poetry collections, he has Mangukui Nodongjayeo (만국의 노동자여 Workers of the World) (Cheongsa, 1989), Dongteuneun Mipomanui Saebyeokeul Ditgo (동트는 미포만의 새벽을 딛고 Stepping Upon the Early Morning of Mipo Bay at Dawn) (Nodong Munhaksa, 1990), Inganui Sigan (인간의 시간 The Time of Humans) (Changbi, 1996), Gileun Gwangyaui Geotsida (길은 광야의 것이다 The Path Belongs to the Field) (Changbi, 1999), Chosim (초심 The Original Intention) (Silcheon Munhaksa, 2003), Gil Bakui Gil (길 밖의 길 The Road Outside of the Road) (Galmuri, 2004), Geodaehan Ilsang (거대한 일상 The Giant Daily Life) (Changbi, 2008), and Geu Modeun Gajangjari (그 모든 가장자리 All the Edges) (Changbi, 2012). For his poetry anthologies there is Geudae Eopsi Jeonyeokeun Ogo (그대 없이 저녁은 오고 The Evening Comes Without You) (ZMANZ, 2012). He was also the editor of Wanjeon-e Gakkaun Gyeoldan (완전에 가까운 결단 A Decision Near Perfection) (Galmuri, 2009), which was a tributary poetry collection for Jeon Tae-il, along with Maeng Mun-jae and Jo Jeong Hwan. He was awarded the first Isan Literary Award in 1989, the 12th Manhae Literature Prize in 1997, the second Oh Jang-hwan Literature Prize in 2009, and the first Imhwa Literature Prize in 2009. He was also the recipient of the 20th Daesan Literary Award for Poetry in 2012. He won the Baek Seok Literary Award in 2015.

== Writing ==
Baek Mu-san is a symbolic figure that represents South Korea's labor poetry. With consistent poetic mind that has its roots in the life of labor, and ceaseless renewal, he has contributed toward raising the reputation of labor poetry. More than anything, the footsteps he had taken, that have been known as the unchanging symbol of 'worker poet', became clearer and deeper as time passed. With poetry thick with criticism on the infinite expansion of capital, and exploration on the roots of human existence that overcomes the value of capital, Baek Mu-san has received the admiration of many. Even when labor literature passed through its heyday during the 1980s and the early 1990s, then lowered its banner and raised another flag, he still constantly kept his focus on the reality that we were in, and sincerely studied humanity and labor. His poetic universe has evolved widely and deeply, from simply exposing the tragic reality of labor to sincerely studying politics and economics as conditions of life that surround people. He writes with emotional but strong voice the threats of the breakdown of humanity and environmental destruction in the modern world, brought on by radical capitalism. Based in strict realism, Baek Mu-san's poetry is direct and honest. As he writes poetry based on the agonizing reality of oppression by the greed and violence of capital, the poet does not ever ignore the tragic reality faced by people going on with their lives. Therefore, Baek Mu-san's poetry makes one realize that deep thought and honesty associated with human existence and life's issues, are the life force of poetry. He displays a unique world of poetry, where he displays keen awareness that cuts right through the ruins of a capitalist society, as well as sees the limits and possibilities faced by life of the time with eyes of deep suffering. His sober view that face the tragedy of life surrounded by violence and oppression of capital, as well as his fearless voice toward an unjust world, come out as a heavy echo. Thus, Baek Mu-san still remains in the place of labor, reminding himself of the day when the world will welcome revolution and change, continuing his song of hope to this day.

== Works ==
=== Poetry collections ===
- Mangukui nodongjayeo (만국의 노동자여 Workers of the World) (Cheongsa, 1989)
- Dongteuneun Mipomanui Saebyeokeul Ditgo (동트는 미포만의 새벽을 딛고 Stepping Upon the Early Morning of Mipo Bay at Dawn) (Nodong Munhaksa, 1990)
- Inganui Sigan (인간의 시간 The Time of Humans) (Changbi, 1996)
- Gileun Gwangyaui Geotsida (길은 광야의 것이다 The Path Belongs to the Field) (Changbi, 1999)
- Chosim (초심 The Original Intention) (Silcheon Munhaksa, 2003)
- Gil Bakui Gil (길 밖의 길 The Road Outside of the Road) (Galmuri, 2004)
- Geodaehan Ilsang (거대한 일상 The Giant Daily Life) (Changbi, 2008)
- Geu Modeun Gajangjari (그 모든 가장자리 All the Edges) (Changbi, 2012)
- Geudae Eopsi Jeonyeokeun Ogo (그대 없이 저녁은 오고 The Evening Comes Without You) (ZMANZ, 2012)
- Pyeheoreul Inyanghada (폐허를 인양하다 Recovering a Ruin) (Changbi, 2015)

=== Works in translation ===
- El Tiempo Humano (in Spanish)

== Awards ==
- 1989 1st Isan Literary Award
- 1997 12th Manhae Literature Prize
- 2007 6th Beautiful Writer Award
- 2009 2nd Oh Jang-hwan Literature Prize
- 2009 1st Imhwa Literature Prize
- 2012 20th Daesan Literary Award for Poetry
- 2015 17th Baek Seok Prize for Literature
