= Baik Tae-ung =

American lawyer (born 1963)

Baik Tae-Ung
- Baik in 2026
- Born: 1963 (age 62–63); Paju, Gyeonggi, South Korea
- Occupation: Law professor
- Known for: human rights expert, 1992 arrest

Korean name
- Hangul: 백태웅
- Hanja: 白泰雄
- RR: Baek Taeung
- MR: Paek T'aeung

Baik Tae-Ung (born 1963) is a Professor of Law at the University of Hawaii at Manoa William S. Richardson School of Law in Honolulu, Hawaii. He is Director of the Center for Korean Studies at the University of Hawaii at Manoa. A leading academic authority on transitional justice, social movement, and human rights in Asia, he specializes in international human rights law, comparative law, and Korean law. Baik is a well-known former South Korean prisoner of conscience.

In 2015, he was selected as a member of the United Nations Human Rights Council Working Group on Enforced or Involuntary Disappearances (WGEID) representing the Asia-Pacific region. He served the WGEID until 2022, as a member (2015–2022), Vice-Chair (2018–2020), and Chair-Rapporteur (2020–2021) reviewing the enforced disappearance cases submitted to the United Nations by the States and the families of the victims or civil society organizations.

He had conducted research on human rights issues as a visiting scholar at the East Asian Legal Studies program at Harvard Law School from 2002 to 2003, and, during his sabbatical in 2017–18, researched as a visiting scholar at the Seoul National University Law Research Institute. He is also a member of the Crimes Against Humanity Initiative Advisory Council, a project of the Whitney R. Harris World Law Institute at Washington University School of Law in St. Louis to establish the world's first treaty on the prevention and punishment of crimes against humanity

== Background ==
Baik was born in Paju, Gyeonggido, and raised in Busan, South Korea. His parents' hometown was Geochang, Gyeongsangnamdo. He graduated from Seoul National University College of Law in Seoul, South Korea, and he continued his legal studies at Notre Dame Law School in the United States, earning his Master (LL.M.) and Doctoral (JSD) degrees in International Human Rights Law.

Previously, he was assistant professor and director of the Korean Legal Studies Program at Peter A. Allard School of Law in Vancouver.

Baik was a legal advisor for the South Korean Delegation in the 56th United Nations Sub-Commission on the Promotion and Protection of Human Rights and has worked for Human Rights Watch in New York as a research consultant with a focus on human rights problems in both North and South Koreas.

He is admitted to the Bar in the State of New York.

== Prisoner of conscience ==
Amnesty International designated Baik a prisoner of conscience for his imprisonment as a former leader of the South Korean Socialist Workers' Alliance, or shortly known as Sanomaeng.

On April 29, 1992, the South Korean Agency for National Security and Planning arrested Baik for violating the National Security Law (NSL) for leading Sanomaeng, which it alleged was an anti-state organization. Under the NSL at the time, an anti-state organization was an "association or group within the territory of the Republic of Korea or outside of it, which has the structure of command and control, as organized for the purpose of assuming a title of the government or disturbing the State". In advance of Sanomaeng, the Agency alleged Baik to have "published and distributed over 20 printed documents about Sanomaeng, to have organized two attacks on police boxes, to have communicated with other Sanomaeng members and to have received money from them".

During his trial in July 1992 before the Seoul District Court, at which the Agency and the Prosecutor requested a death sentence. Baik told the court that following his arrest, he was interrogated for 22 days and subjected to various forms of abuse:

During the 22 days of ANSP interrogation, I was subjected to various types of torture such as sleep deprivation, drug injection and mob beating. Going through these rounds of torture I prepared myself for death three times . . .Five days before my [being sent to the prosecution], interrogators had this look on their faces that they had had enough of it, taking me to a special torture chamber. In the middle of the night investigators beat me for hours. They took turns in beating. Their demand was that complete silence was unacceptable.

Baik received a sentence of life imprisonment on 27 October 1992. Amnesty International quoted another report as stating that the judge wished for Baik to be "segregated from society indefinitely" for his refusal to accept the market economy mandated in the Constitution; however, his renunciation of violence had spared him the requested sentence of death. The High Court reduced Baik's sentence to 15 years' imprisonment on February 20, 1993.

After a campaign by Amnesty International and other civil society organizations for Baik's freedom, he was released in August 1998 from Wonju Correctional Institution in Wonju after six years and three months of imprisonment.

== Publications ==
Baik is the author of the book Emerging Regional Human Rights Systems in Asia. The translated and updated version of was published in Korea by Changbi Publishers Inc., entitled Seeking the Human Rights Community in Asia, in 2017. It received the 2017 Book of Peace Award by the IPUS, Seoul National University, and was selected as 2018 Excellent Academic Book by the National Academy of Sciences, Republic of Korea. He is also the author of The Dream of Korean Socialist Movement and has published several academic articles.
