= Seocho-dong =

Neighborhood in Seoul, South Korea

Coordinates: 37°29′N 127°01′E

- Seoul Arts Center located in Seocho-dong.

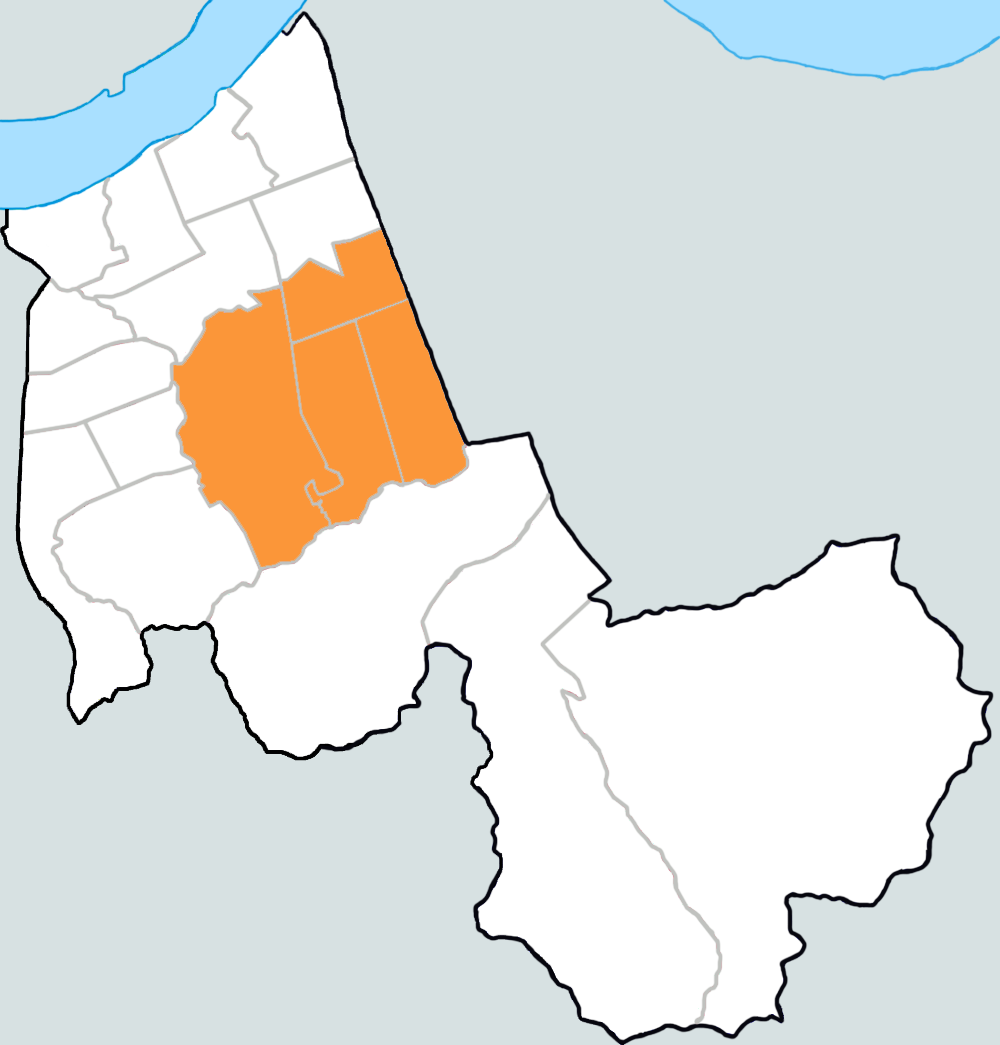
- Seocho-dong within Seocho District
- Country: South Korea

Area
  - Total: 6.51 km^{2} (2.51 sq mi)

Population (2012)
  - Total: 107,989
  - Density: 16,600/km^{2} (43,000/sq mi)

Korean name
- Hangul: 서초동
- Hanja: 瑞草洞
- RR: Seocho-dong
- MR: Sŏch'o-dong

Seocho-dong (Korean: 서초동) is a dong (neighbourhood) of Seocho District, Seoul, South Korea. Seocho-dong is divided into 4 different dong which are Seocho 1-dong, 2-dong, 3-dong and 4-dong. The main street is Teheranno. There is Gangnam Station in Seocho-dong, which is one of the biggest stations in Korea.

== Education ==
- Universities
  - Seoul National University of Education
- High Schools
  - Seocho High School
  - Seoul High School
  - Yangjae High School
- Middle Schools
  - Seocho Middle School
  - Seoil Middle School
  - Seoun Middle School
  - Yeongdong Middle School
- Elementary Schools
  - The Elementary School attached to Seoul National University of Education
  - Seocho Elementary School
  - Seoil Elementary School
  - Wonmyeong Elementary School
  - Seoi Elementary School
  - Sinjung Elementary School

== Transportation ==
- Gangnam Station of and of Shinbundang Line
- Seoul National University of Education Station of and of
- Seocho Station of
- Nambu Bus Terminal Station of
- Yangjae Station of and of Shinbundang Line

== See also ==
- Administrative divisions of South Korea
