= Seocho station =

Train station in South Korea

Coordinates: 37°29′31″N 127°00′29″E

서초; Seocho
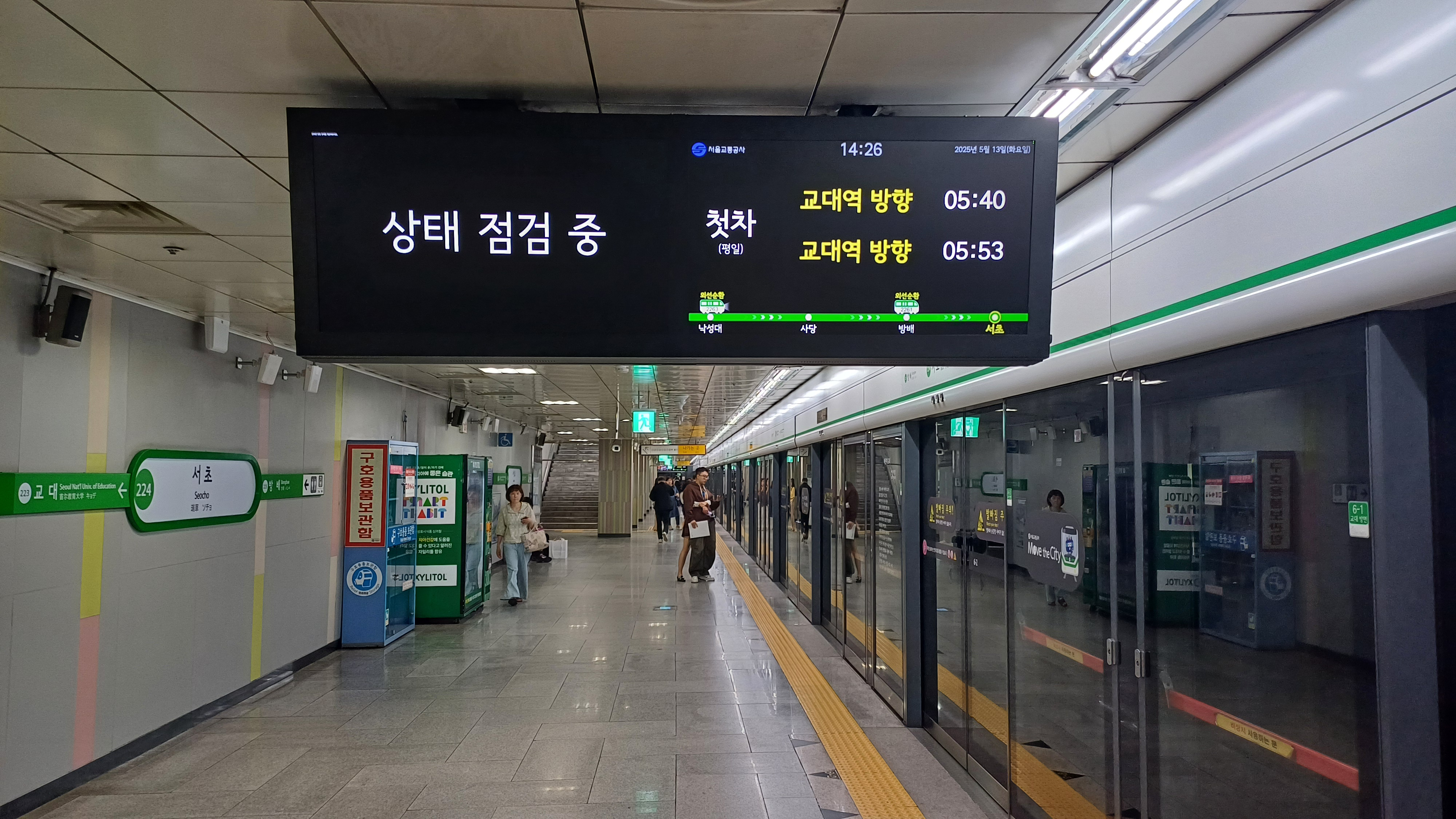
- Station sign

Korean name
- Hangul: 서초역
- Hanja: 瑞草驛
- RR: Seocho-yeok
- MR: Sŏch'o-yŏk

General information
- Location: 1500 Seocho 3-dong, Seocho-gu, Seoul
- Operator: Seoul Metro
- Line: Line 2
- Platforms: 2
- Tracks: 2

Construction
- Structure type: Underground

History
- Opened: December 17, 1983

Passengers
- (Daily) Based on Jan-Dec of 2012. Line 2: 40,112

Services
Preceding station	Seoul Metropolitan Subway	Following station
Seoul National University of Education Next counterclockwise	Line 2	Bangbae Next clockwise
Location

Seocho Station is a station on the Seoul Subway Line 2. It is located in Seocho-dong, Seocho-gu, Seoul.

== Station layout ==
G	Street level	Exit

L1; Concourse	Lobby	Customer Service, Shops, Vending machines, ATMs

L2; Platform level	Side platform, doors will open on the right
L2; Platform level	Inner circle	← Line 2 Next clockwise (Bangbae)
L2; Platform level	Outer circle	Line 2 Next counterclockwise (Seoul Nat'l Univ. of Education) →
L2; Platform level	Side platform, doors will open on the right

== Ridership ==
Station	Numbers						
Station	2000	2001	2002	2003	2004	2005	2006
Line2	16698	16278	15702	15590	16347	16677	16509

== Neighborhoods ==
- Exit 1: Korea Research Institute for Local Administration
- Exit 5: Supreme Public Prosecutor's Office
- Exit 5: National Library of Korea
- Exit 5: Supreme Court of Korea
- Exit 5: Seocho Police Station
- Exit 6: Seoul Central Public Prosecutor's Office
