= Seoul National University of Education station =

Subway station at Seocho, Seoul

교대 (법원·검찰청); Seoul Nat'l Univ. of Education (Court & Prosecutors' Office)
교대 (법원·검찰청); Seoul Nat'l Univ. of Education (Court & Prosecutors' Office)
- Station nameplate (Line 2)

Korean name
- Hangul: 교대역
- Hanja: 敎大驛
- Revised Romanization: Gyodae-yeok
- McCune–Reischauer: Kyodae-yŏk

General information
- Location: 294 Seochodaero Jiha; Seocho-gu, Seoul
- Coordinates: 37°29′37″N 127°00′49″E
- Operator: Seoul Metro
- Lines: Line 2 Line 3
- Platforms: 3
- Tracks: 4

Construction
- Structure type: Underground

Key dates
- December 23, 1982: Line 2 opened
- October 18, 1985: Line 3 opened

Passengers
- (Daily) Based on Jan-Dec of 2012. Line 2: 85,532; Line 3: 26,526

Services
Preceding station	Seoul Metropolitan Subway	Following station
Gangnam Next counterclockwise	Line 2	Seocho Next clockwise
Express Bus Terminal towards Daehwa	Line 3	Nambu Bus Terminal towards Ogeum
Location

Seoul Nat'l Univ. of Education Station is a station in the Seocho District of Seoul, on Seoul Subway Line 2 and Line 3. It is usually noted on station signs and on-board announcements that the station serves (the Supreme) Court & Prosecutors' Office.

This subway station is a transfer point between the circular Line 2 (the busiest line on the network) which runs east–west at this point, and the north-south Line 3. The station is an extremely busy transfer point for those travelling between central Seoul and Gangnam district, Teheran Valley and the COEX/KWTC complex.

The station is commonly referred to as "Gyodae".

The Seoul National University of Education is located nearby.

== Station layout ==
G	Street level	Exit

B1F; Concourse	Lobby	Customer Service, Shops, Vending machines, ATMs

B2F; Line 2 platforms	Side platform, doors will open on the right
B2F; Line 2 platforms	Inner circle	← Line 2 Next clockwise (Seocho)
B2F; Line 2 platforms	Outer circle	Line 2 Next counterclockwise (Gangnam) →
B2F; Line 2 platforms	Side platform, doors will open on the right

B3F; Line 3 platforms	Northbound	← Line 3 toward Daehwa (Express Bus Terminal)
B3F; Line 3 platforms	Island platform, doors will open on the left
B3F; Line 3 platforms	Southbound	Line 3 toward Ogeum (Nambu Bus Terminal) →

== Gallery ==
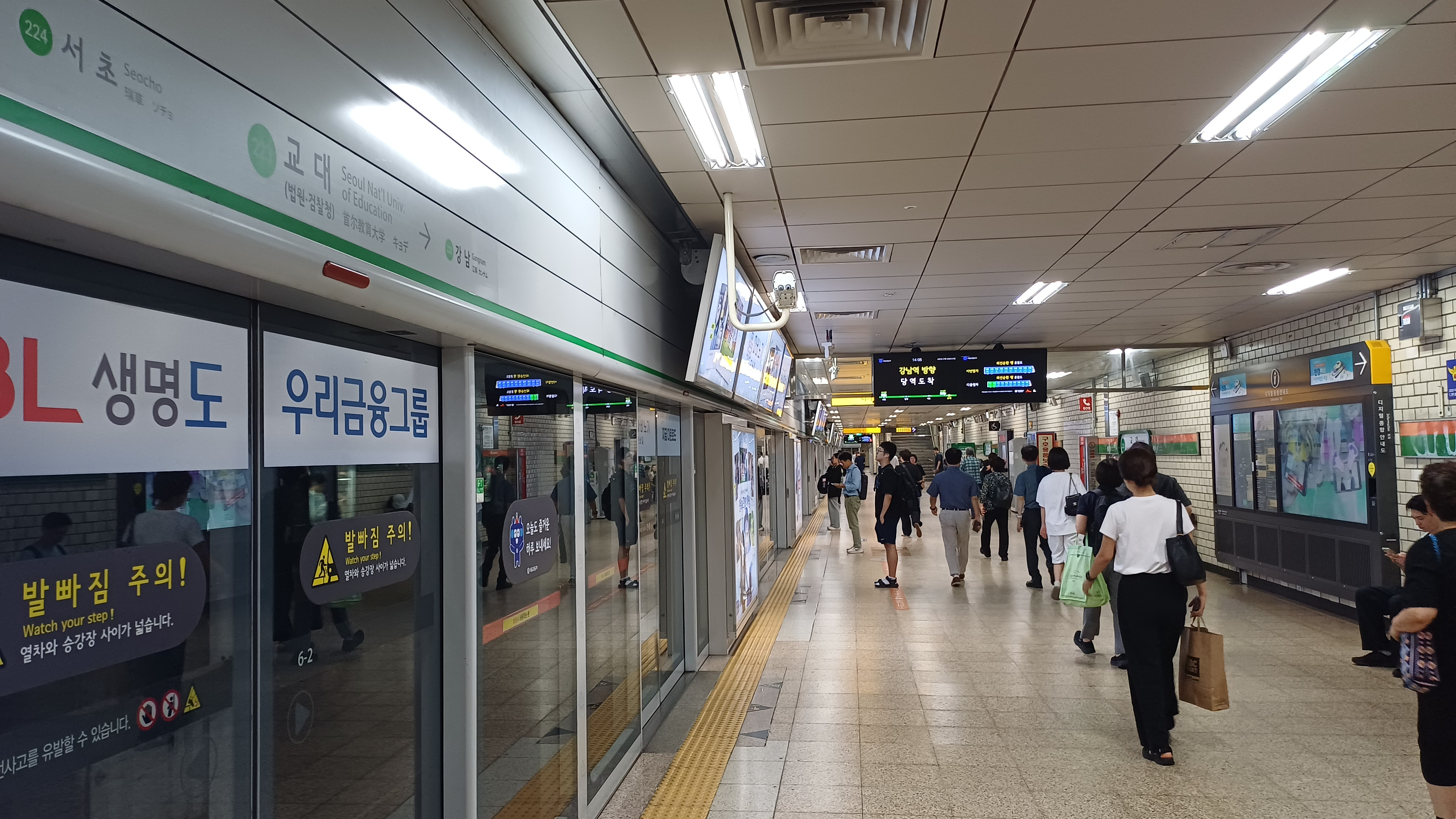
Station platform (Line 2)

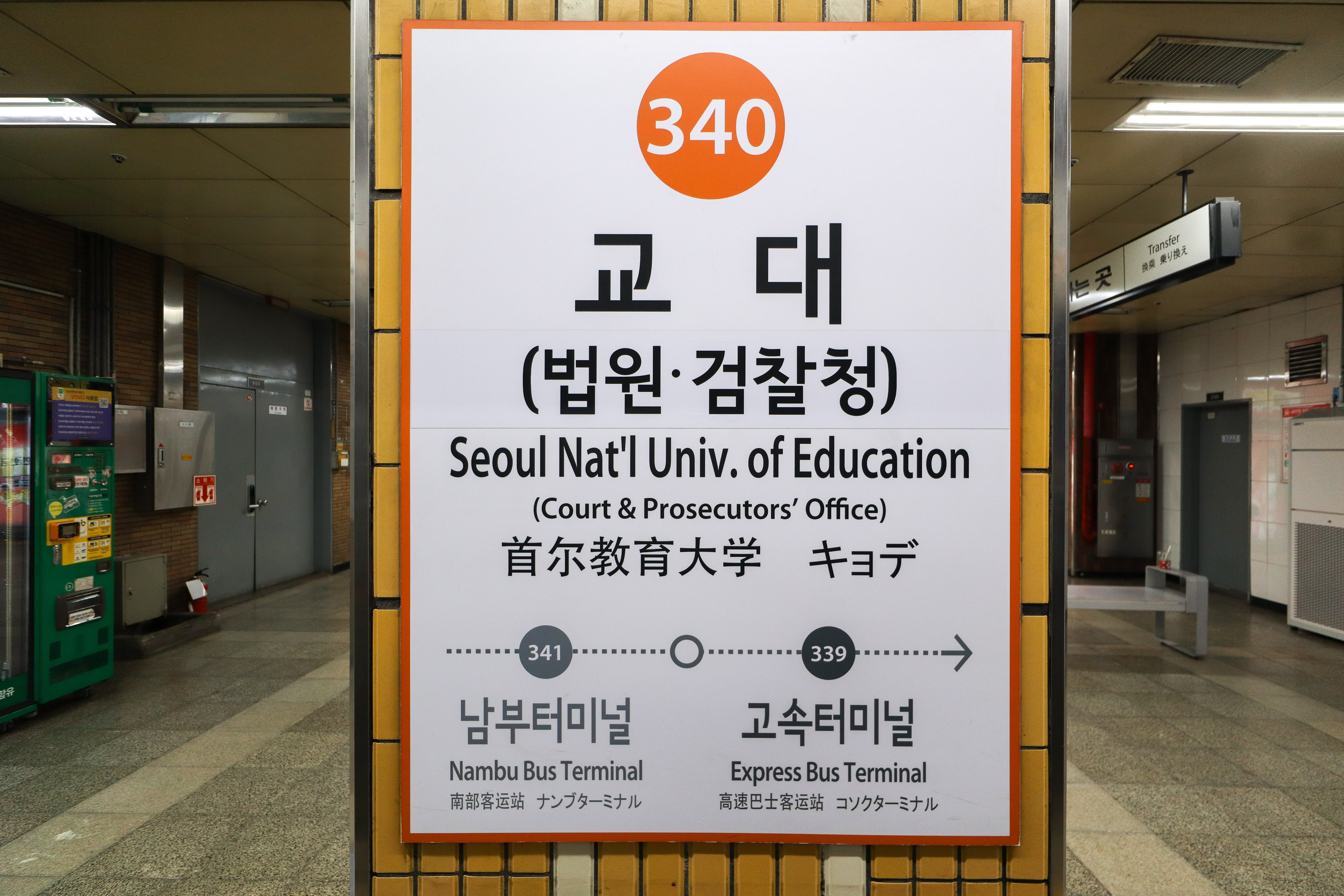
Station nameplate (Line 3)

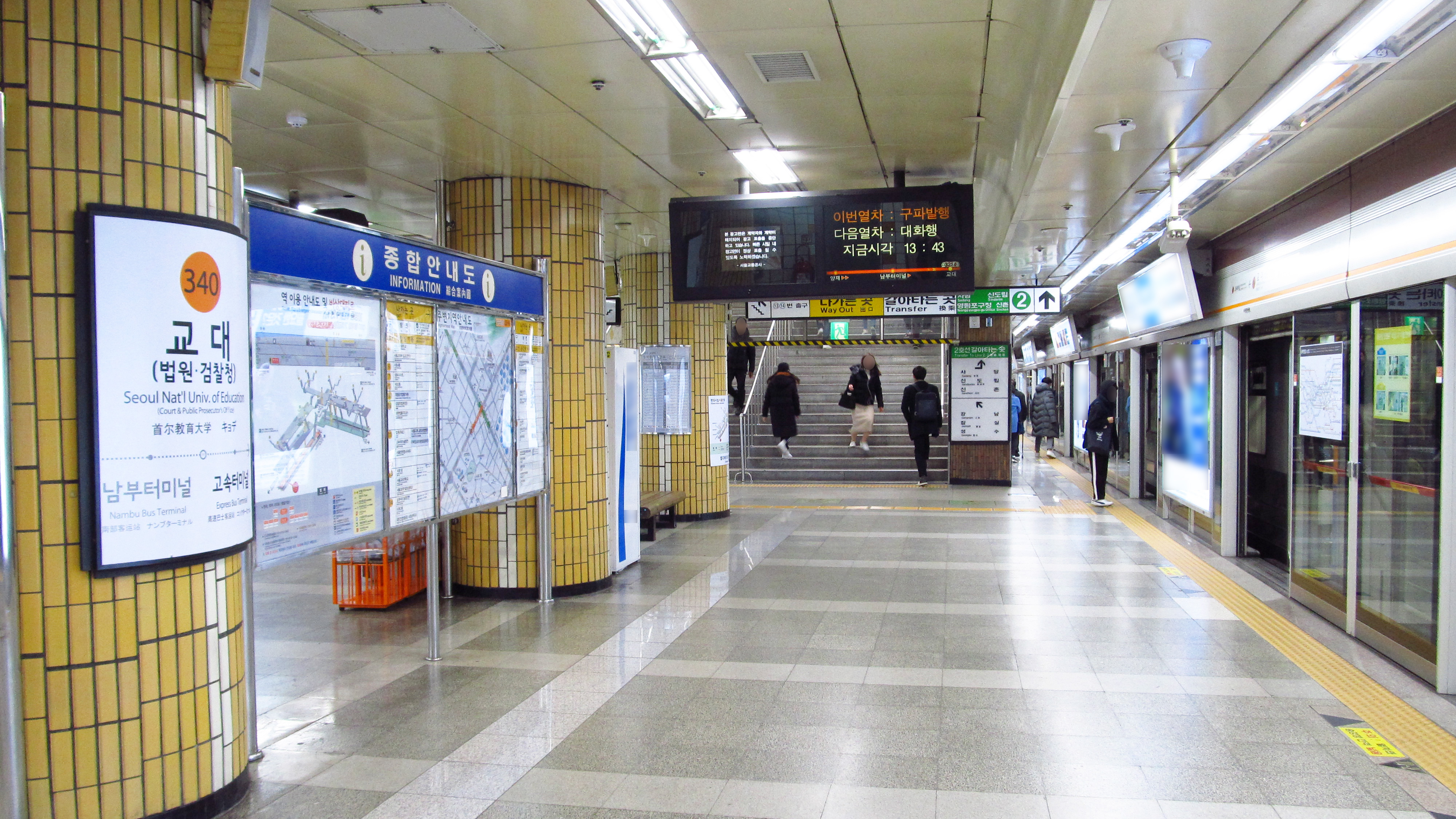
Station platform (Line 3)
