= Park Nohae =

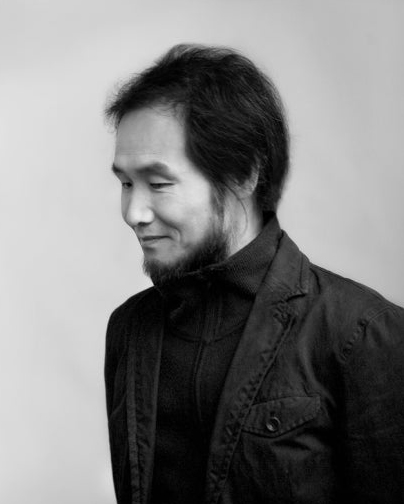
- Park Nohae
- Born: Park Gi-pyeong (박기평); Hampyeong County, South Jeolla Province, South Korea
- Occupations: Poet; photographer; activist
- Board member of: NANUMMUNHWA(Sharing of Culture)

Park Nohae (Korean: 박노해; born 1957) is a South Korean poet, photographer and activist.

At the age of twenty-seven, Park published his first collection of poems, titled Dawn of Labor, in 1984. Despite official bans, this collection sold nearly a million copies, and he became an intensely symbolic figure of resistance, often called the "Faceless Poet."

In 1991 the scene of him smiling brightly while facing the death sentence still evokes a strong memory. After seven and a half years in prison, he was pardoned in 1998. Thereafter, he was reinstated as a contributor to the democratization movement, but he refused any state compensation, saying "I will not live today by selling the past."

In 2003, right after the United States' invasion of Iraq, he flew to the field of war. Since then, he often visits countries that are suffering from war and poverty in order to raise awareness about the situation through his photos and writings. In 2006, he established 〈Zaituna(Olive) Nanum Munhwa School〉in Ain Al-Hilweh, the world's largest Palestinian refugee camp in Lebanon, and he has been supporting the school for 18 years.

In 2024, his first collection of poems, Dawn of labor published in United States.

== Early life ==
Park Nohae was born in 1957 in Hampyeong, South Jeolla Province, a southern province of South Korea, and grew up in a farming town, Beolgyo, Goheung. Both his father, a pansori singer, who had participated in Korea's independence and progressive movements, and his mother who was a devout Catholic, greatly influenced him from his childhood. Later, his brother became a priest and headed the Catholic Priests Association for Justice that took a leading role in the democratization of South Korea, and his younger sister became a nun. At the age of seven when his father suddenly died, his fate began to get on a wild journey, as his family became poor, and the family members had to be separated from each other. Such misfortune and solitude at his early age made him get immersed in reading and writing.

Park left his hometown and moved to Seoul, the capital city of South Korea. He worked during daytime and attended the night classes at Seollin Commercial High School. He began to build up a labor activist's career while working in the fields of construction, textiles, chemicals, metals, and logistics. At that time, Korea was going through a dark period under the military dictatorship; night curfews were in place; freedom of the press, presidential elections, and labor's primary rights were severely violated.

== 1980s, "the icon of Revolutionary" in South Korea ==
There has never been an artistic event
as shocking as 'Dawn of Labor,' before or since.

— Kang Heon, cultural critic

Park Nohae is a history, a symbol, and a myth.
All the way through the history of literature
and society alike, we may never
meet such a being again.

— Doh Jeong-ill, literary critic

The 1980s, when the labor movement was at its most active in South Korea, was also the most active period for the creation of labor poetry. The poetry of this time, represented mainly by Park Nohae and Baek Mu-san. He then took the pseudonym Park Nohae('No' means 'labor,' 'Hae' means 'liberation') and published his first collection of poems, Dawn of Labor, in 1984, under that name. Because it was almost the first collection of poems written by workers from the perspective of workers, it produced a huge shock wave not only in Korean society but also in the literary and intellectual communities. Korea was at that time under the military dictatorship of Chun Doo-hwan, with strict censorship. Despite official bans, this collection sold nearly a million copies and created intense interest. The unknown poet became an intensely symbolic figure of resistance.

== 1990s, Demanded the death sentence, Sentenced to life imprisonment ==
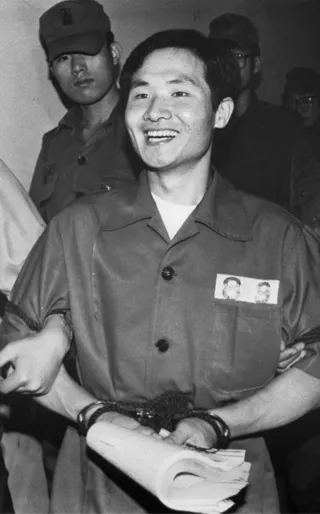
Park Nohae smiling while facing the death sentence

For many years he was active underground, helping establish the South Korean Socialist Workers' Alliance in 1989. After spending seven years of his life hiding from the police, he was finally arrested in 1991. After twenty-four days of investigation, coupled with cruel, illegal torture, at his trial the state prosecutors even demanded the death sentence for him as an enemy of the state. He was finally sentenced to life imprisonment. Park Nohae said the following in his final statement in court: "Even if I disappear on the scaffold, I hope that more Park No-haes will appear and build a society where the working class is the master."

While he was in prison, a second poetry collection was published, True Beginning(1993) as well as a collection of essays, Only a Person is Hope(1997). He was finally freed in 1998 after being amnestied by President Kim Dae-Jung who was awarded the Nobel Peace Prize. Withdrawing from his previous role, he helped establish a nonprofit social organization "Nanum Munhwa"(Culture of Sharing) with Koreans concerned with the great challenges confronting global humanity.

=== 1999 NHK documentary 'Park Nohae, Korea's New Hope - Only a Person is Hope' ===
On 3 May 1999, a documentary titled '#Park Nohae, Korea's New Hope - Only a Person is Hope#', produced by Toshiro Kishi, Seoul Bureau Chief of NHK, was broadcast in Japan. He interviewed Park Nohae for seven months, filming more than 50 hours of footage and compressing it into one hour.

== 2000s, Global Peace Sharing as a photographer as well as an activist ==
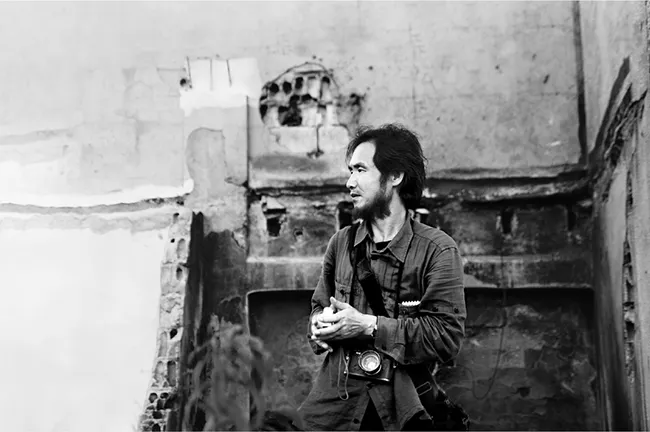
Park Nohae in the battlefield of Lebanon, 2007

In 2003, at the United States' invasion of Iraq, he went to protect helpless civilians and promote peace. At that time, he undertook peace activities in Bagdad and in other Middle Eastern countries for 75 days. In 2006, he was in Lebanon on a similar peace-making mission and publicly opposed the dispatch of Korean combat troops to the Middle East. From the start, he combined poetry-writing and photography, as he went to many countries that were suffering from wars and poverty, such as Palestine, Kurdistan, Pakistan, Aceh(Indonesia), Burma, India, Ethiopia, Sudan, Peru and Bolivia. In 2010, he held his first exhibition of photos "Ra Wilderness," and since then he has continued to hold exhibitions to draw public attention to global issues of poverty, human values, and warfare.

My poetry is a transcript of words
dictated by small and powerless people,
and my photos are portrayals of
their strong prayers of life, and their souls.

— Park Nohae, 2010 Photo exhibition 'Like them, I am there'

Also, in 2010, he finally published a large new collection of poems, So You Must Not Disappear, on themes such as resistance, spirituality, education, living, revolution and love.

=== 2014 Raising the Spirit of the Times with the Topic of 'Another Way' ===
The photo exhibition "Another Way" held in 2014 brought back the 'Park No-hae Phenomenon' by attracting over 35,000 visitors over 27 days. From Tibet, the land that is the roof of the human spirit, to Pakistan, which was once called heaven but is now called hell, to India with its two extreme faces, and further on to Burma, Indonesia, and Laos, a total of 140 carefully selected photos from 6 countries were exhibited.

The rise of the Asian era is not simply a matter of shifting economic power, but rather an event in human history that presents us with the task of 'civilizational transition.' What will be left when a huge population community of more than half the world follows the Western path of 'growth and progress'?

— Park Nohae

The Asia in Park No-hae's photos is not a 'land of tears' or a mystified 'Oriental' Asia, but a land where the 'last seeds' remain. Through his photographs of 'another way,' he presented 'the prototype of a good life' and 'a worldview of hope.'

In 2024, 10th anniversary reissue of the photo essay Another Way was published.

=== 2016–2017 Candlelight Revolution ===
When the citizens of Korea began to hold candlelight demonstrations in protest at the corruption of the Korean government under Park Geun-hae, he and the members of "Culture of Sharing" participated actively, then in 2017 published a large album book Candlelight Revolution for first anniversary of the 2016–17 South Korean candlight protests which contains historical records.

=== 2012-Today ===
Since then, he continues, with the members of "Culture of Sharing," to hold photo exhibitions in a dedicated gallery, the Ra Cafe and Gallery, in Seoul. The photo exhibitions are held under the general theme of 'Questions about Life', and a photo essay of the same name is published each time. such as One Day(2019), Simply, Firmly, Gracefully(2020), The Path(2020), My Dear Little Room(2021), Children Are Amazing(2022), Beneath the Olive Tree(2023), and Mountain Light(2025). All essay texts are in both Korean and English.

== 2020s, publishing books of various genres and writing books on thought ==
In 2021, he published a collection of aphorism, Reading While Walking Along which he has been writing every morning for seven years on social media.

Now there are black shadows cast over the world and barriers rise between people. But humans are walking beings, meeting beings, and reading beings.

— Park Nohae, Reading While Walking Along, preface

In 2022, he published a new collection of poems, the first in 12 years, Seeing Your Heaven.

In 2024, he published a first collection of autobiographical essays, the first in 12 years, The Tear-flowering Boy: Childhood Stories.

In the advanced 'age of the individual' standing on the plateau of liberal democracy and equality, the losses are as great and deep as the achievements; the noble human spirit and virtue have fallen to the ground, and the seeds of a hope that has existed for thousands of years are being lost and forgotten. (…) The reason I struggle to write like this again today is because there is an old spark of hope that I have harbored within me. It is because I must remember and pass on the world and times I experienced, the struggles and wonders of the people I met, in that one place and time on Earth, in a corner of the boundless universe. This is because I have my own experience and testimony that no one can replace, and there is a love and secret message that has been passed down to me.

— Park Nohae, The Tear-flowering Boy: Childhood Stories, Author's Note

In 2024, the 40th anniversary of Dawn of Labor, an English version was published in the United States.

Among the works of poet Park Nohae, I wanted to introduce Dawn of Labor overseas first. I thought that there was no poetry as powerful as this, transcending time and borders. Park Nohae cannot be called just a poet. His life is like the history of an era, and his existence gives inspiration and hope to many people.

— Brother Anthony, English translator of Dawn of Labor

This translation of Park Nohae's first collection of poems, Dawn of Labor, could not arrive at a more propitious moment. For this "faceless poet," this "enemy of the state," whose writings earned him a death sentence and years in solitary confinement, is not only a legendary figure in Korean letters and society but a prophet of global liberation—a man dedicated to the proposition that a community of kindred poetic spirits can inspire social justice. If the plight of factory workers makes him "think about the eradication/ of the Korean language," it also leads him to "dedicate these words, like a round of drinks, to [his] working brothers and sisters, who live and act diligently without losing hope and laughter." These poems clarify what we most need to know, wherever we may find ourselves in the world.

— Christopher Merrill, author of Self-Portrait with Dogwood

He is currently writing a book of reflections titled The Human Path in Space, the only book he has undertaken in the thirty years since his imprisonment. In it, he reflects on the idea of the “Forest of True People,” a community based on simple living, with few possessions. The poet continues to plant and cultivate flowers and trees in his small garden, which he sees as part of a gradual movement toward a new kind of revolution.

== List of works ==
=== Collections of Poems ===
- The Dawn of Labor (노동의 새벽) (First edition: Pulbit, 1984 / 30th anniversary Revised edition: Slow Walking, 2014) - His first book, sold nearly a million copies despite being banned
- True Beginning (참된 시작) (First edition: Changbi Publishers, 1993 / Revised edition: Slow Walking, 2016) - Prison writing, sold over a hundred thousand copies
- So You Must Not Disappear (그러니 그대 사라지지 말아라) (Slow Walking, 2010)
- Looking Up At Your Sky (너의 하늘을 보아) (Slow Walking, 2022)
- Dawn of Labor (English First edition: University of Hawai'i Press, 2024)

=== Essay ===
- Only a Person is Hope (사람만이 희망이다) (First edition: Hainaim, 1997 / Revised edition: Slow Walking, 2015) - Prison writing
- Aceh's Weeping for Too Long (아체는 너무 오래 울고 있다) (Slow Walking, 2005) - Reportage
- It Seems Like Nobody Exists Here (여기에는 아무도 없는 것만 같아요) (Slow Walking, 2007) - Reportage
- Another Way (다른 길) (Slow Walking, 2014) - Photographic essay
- Reading While Walking Along (걷는 독서) (Slow Walking, 2021)
- The Tear-Flowering Boy (눈물꽃 소년) (Slow Walking, 2024) - Autobiographical essays
- Another Way (다른 길) (Slow Walking, 2024) - Photographic essay, 10th anniversary revised edition

=== Photobook ===
- Ra Wilderness (라 광야) (Slow Walking, 2010)
- Like Them, I am There (나 거기에 그들처럼) (Slow Walking, 2010) - Hardcover
- Another Way (다른 길) (Slow Walking, 2014) - Hardcover

=== Supervised and Special Contribution ===
- Candlelight Revolution (촛불혁명) (Slow Walking, 2017)

=== Photo Essay series ===
- 01 One Day (하루) (Slow Walking, 2019)
- 02 Simply, Firmly, Gracefully (단순하게 단단하게 단아하게) (Slow Walking, 2020)
- 03 The Path (길) (Slow Walking, 2020)
- 04 My Dear Little Room (내 작은 방) (Slow Walking, 2022)
- 05 Children are Amazing (아이들은 놀라워라) (Slow Walking, 2022)
- 06 Beneath the Olive Tree (올리브나무 아래) (Slow Walking, 2023)
- 07 Mountain Light (산빛) (Slow Walking, 2025)

=== Poetry Picture Book ===
- The Blue Light Girl (푸른 빛의 소녀가) (Slow Walking, 2020)

== Exhibitions ==
=== Ra Wilderness ===
(라 광야) (Gallery M, Seoul, Korea, 2010) - His first photo exhibition

=== Like Them, I am There ===
(나 거기에 그들처럼) (Sejong Center for the Performing Arts, Seoul, Korea, 2010)

=== Another Way ===
(다른 길) (Sejong Center for the Performing Arts, Seoul, Korea, 2014) - Photo exhibition on Asia (Pakistan, Laos, Burma, Indonesia, Tibet, India)

=== Ra Cafe Gallery Permanent Exhibitions (since 2012) ===
- Photo Exhibition on Pakistan, "A Village Where Clouds Dwell" (April 16 – July 31, 2012)
- Photo Exhibition on Burma, "Singing Lake" (August 3 – October 31, 2012)
- Photo Exhibition on Tibet, "Bloom and Fall with Nothing Left" (November 2, 2012 – February 27, 2013)
- Photo Exhibition on Q'ero in the Andes, "Q'erotica" (March 1 – July 10, 2013)
- Photo Exhibition on Sudan "On the Shores of the Nile" (July 12 – November 13, 2013)
- Photo Exhibition on the Middle East "Ra wilderness" (November 15, 2013 – March 1, 2014) (Encore)
- Photo Exhibition on Ethiopia "Blooming Footsteps" (March 3 – July 23, 2014)
- Photo Exhibition on Latin America "Titicaca" (July 25 – November 19, 2014)
- Photo Exhibition on Peru "Gracias a la vida" (November 21, 2014 – March 18, 2015)
- Photo Exhibition on Aljazeera, titled "Like them beneath the Sun" (March 20, 2015 – July 15, 2015)
- Photo Exhibition on India "Dire Dire" (July 17, 2015 – January 13, 2016)
- Photo Exhibition on Kashmir, "Kashmir's Spring" (January 15 – June 29, 2016)
- Photo Exhibition on Indonesia, "The Caldera's Wind" (July 1, 2016 – December 28)
- Photo Exhibition on Kurds "Kurdistan" (December 30, 2016 – June 28, 2017)
- Photo Exhibition on Laos "Morning of Laos" (June 30, 2017 – February 28, 2018)
- Photo Exhibition on Palestine, "Dream of the Olive Tree" (March 2, 2018 – October 31)
- Photo Exhibition titled "Goodbye, and..." (November 2, 2018 – February 10, 2019)
- Photo Exhibition titled "One Day"(하루) (Jun 22, 2019 – Jan 10, 2020)
- Photo Exhibition titled "Simply, Firmly, Gracefully"(단순하게 단단하게 단아하게) (Jan 15, 2020 – Aug 30, 2020)
- Photo Exhibition titled "The Path"(길) (Sep 1, 2020 – Jun 6, 2021)
- Text&Photo Exhibition titled "Reading While Walking Along"(걷는 독서) (Jun 8, 2021 – Dec. 31, 2021)
- Photo Exhibition titled "My Dear Little Room"(내 작은 방) (Jan 4, 2022 – Sep 18, 2022)
- Photo Exhibition titled "Children are Amazing"(아이들은 놀라워라) (Sep 30, 2022 – Oct 1, 2023)
- Photo Exhibition titled "Beneath the Olive Tree"(올리브나무 아래) (Oct 4, 2023 – Aug 25, 2024)
- Photo Exhibition titled "A New Day"(다른 오늘)(Aug 30, 2024 – June 29, 2025)
- Photo Exhibition titled "Mountain Light"(산빛)(Jul 4, 2025 – Mar 29, 2026)
