= Seoul National University of Education =

National university for elementary education in Seoul

Coordinates: 37°29′24.00″N 127°00′59.00″E

- 서울교육대학교
- Type: National
- Established: May 22, 1946; 80 years ago
- President: Jang Shin-ho (장신호)
- Location: Seocho, Seoul, South Korea
- Website: www.snue.ac.kr

- Seoul National University of Education
- Hangul: 서울교육대학교
- Hanja: 서울教育大學校
- RR: Seoul gyoyuk daehakgyo
- MR: Sŏul kyoyuk taehakkyo

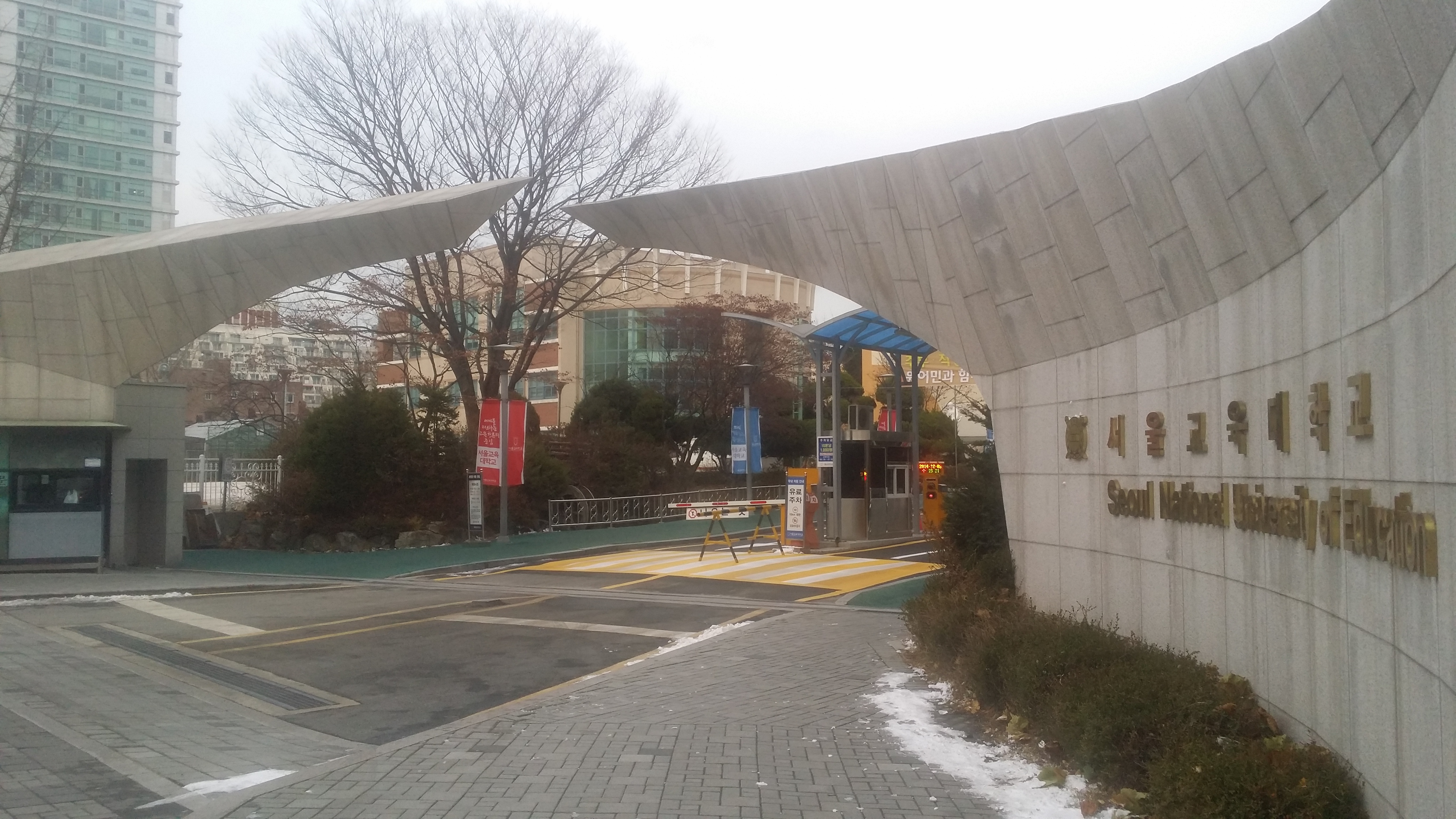
Back gate

The Seoul National University of Education (SNUE) is a public university in Seocho-gu, Seoul, South Korea, which provides specialized training for future public elementary school teachers in South Korea. Founded in May 1946 under the name of Kyunggi Public Normal School, the university is the first national university that specializes in elementary school teacher training. The university offers graduate and undergraduate programs, and has an attached elementary school.

== History ==
The school was originally founded as Kyunggi Public Normal School on May 22, 1946. The attached elementary school, which functions as a research school for teachers-in-training and researchers, opened on March 1, 1953. On March 1, 1962, the university was incorporated as a branch of Seoul National University.
In 1977, the campus moved to its current location in Seocho-gu, Seoul.
The school has expanded throughout the years into various institutes and support centers, such as the International Language Institute and the Center for the Education of Gifted Children in Science.
After a series of name changes due to organizational shifts over the years, Seoul National University of Education was endowed with its current name in 1993. Shortly thereafter in 1996, SNUE established its Graduate School of Education.

=== Timeline ===
- 22.5.1946 - Kyunggi Public Normal School (경기공립사범학교) was founded.
- 10.10.1949 - Renamed to Seoul National Teachers School (국립 서울 사범학교).
- 1.3.1953 - The Elementary School attached to SNTS(서울사범부속국민학교) established.
- 1.3.1962 - Reorganized as the Teacher's College branch of Seoul National University; the First Dean, Mr. Cho Jae Ho, inaugurated.
- 1.3.1963 - Renamed Seoul National Teachers Junior College, Elementary School Teacher in Service Training Center established.
- 10.10.1968 - Teacher Training Center Attached to SNUE established.
- 16.6.1969 - The 201st RNTC established.
- 1.9.1969 - Students Guidance Center established.
- 29.9.1973 - Science Education Center established in accordance with the decree of the establishment of the national school. (Presidential decree, Number 6881)
- 23.2.1977 - Moved to the new campus at 636 Seocho Dong, Seocho-gu, Seoul.
- 1.3.1983 - Promoted to 4-year Seoul National Teachers College in accordance with the educational law (no. 3370).
- 1.2.1983 - Compulsory Education Research Center established.
- 5.3.1986 - Elementary Education Research Center established.
- 21.1.1988 - The dormitory became a legal organization in accordance with the decree of the establishment of the national school article number 29
- 24.2.1988 - Renaming of 'Student Guidance Center' to 'Student Service Center' in accordance with the decree of the establishment of the national school, Elementary Education Research Center became a legal research center, Computer Center established
- 1.9.1992 - The 175 ROTC established
- 1.3.1993 - Renamed to Seoul National University of Education
- 2.3.1995 - Social Education Center Attached to SNUE established
- 10.11.1995 - SNUE Graduate School of Education established
- 26.8.1996 - Online SNUE opened in Hitel, Korean PC communication network.
- 1.3.1997 - Added more majors to the Graduate School curriculum. (Major in Elementary Ethics Education, Music Education, Education Methods, English Education)
- 1.3.1998 - Added more majors to the Graduate School curriculum. (Major in Elementary Mathematics Education, Fine Arts Education, Computer Education)
- 1.3.2001 - Added more majors to the Graduate School curriculum. (Major in Elementary Unification Education, Early Childhood Education, Global & Cultural Studies Education)

== Academics ==
=== Undergraduate College ===
The Undergraduate College offers the single major of Elementary Education and variety of specialized concentrations within the major:

- Ethics Education
- Korean Language Education
- Social Studies Education
- Mathematics Education
- Science Education
- Physical Education
- Music Education
- Fine Arts Education
- Practical Arts Education
- Elementary Education
- English Education
- Computer Education
- Early Childhood and Special Education

=== Graduate school ===
The SNUE Graduate School aims to train teachers specializing in elementary education. It also promotes various fields and specialties, continuing education, and the improvement of academic abilities for elementary school teachers. It offers the following majors:

- Elementary Ethics Education
- Elementary Korean Language Education
- Elementary Social Studies Education
- Elementary Mathematics Education
- Elementary Science Education
- Elementary Physical Education
- Elementary Music Education
- Elementary Fine Arts Education
- Elementary Education Methods
- Elementary English Education
- Elementary Computer Education
- Elementary Practical Arts Education
- Elementary Educational Administration
- Elementary Counseling Education
- Elementary Environmental Education
- Elementary Unified Education
- Global & Cultural Studies Education
- Early Childhood Education

=== TESOL Courses ===
SNUE also has an active TESOL program consisting of a standard attendance program along with a Saturday only course for students who are unable to follow the regular course. The course was designed to give both native and non-native English teachers the skills to teach effectively in the classroom. SNUE's TESOL program is delivered in conjunction with the Australian Griffith University and the two universities also conduct overseas trips for further training between Seoul, South Korea and Brisbane, Australia.

== Campus ==
SNUE is located at Seocho-dong, Seocho-gu, in the southern part of Seoul. While this part of Seoul was a newly developing area with scarce population and lower land value in 1977 (when the campus was established), the area is now the opposite after its rapid development in the 70s and the 80s.

=== Dormitory ===
The dormitory is for students from provincial areas. It helps SNUE students to experience a successful group life by encouraging autonomy and discipline. It has convenient facilities such as a lobby, a reading room, bathrooms, cooking facilities, a seminar room, a physical exercise room, a water purifier, pianos, and more. Freshmen generally are given a priority admission to the dormitory (50% of the total capacity). Dormitory members are arranged according to the year and personal preferences.

=== Attached Elementary School ===
The attached elementary school is an experimental research school for effective teaching practices and performance policy, as judged by the Ministry of Education. It offers compulsory elementary education, substantial studies, and activities that provide guidance for Intern Teachers, analysis and application of experimental textbooks, experimental application and generalization of the curriculum, experimental research of various educational policies, and workshops for teachers to reform the classroom. The school also has special educational support programs, such as the operation of classes for Korean students from other countries, active education of folk art, education for special aptitude with varied learning through hands-on experience and ICT (information, communication & technology) education.

=== Public transit access ===
The campus is served by Seoul Nat'l Univ. of Education Station, a transit station between Seoul Subway Line 2 and 3.

Seoul Express Bus Terminal and Seoul Nambu Bus Terminal are a station away from the campus, making the campus accessible for students from outer-Seoul area.

== Student life ==
Student life in SNUE is different from that of other universities. Due to the university's status as a specialized institution, students already have a set curriculum laid out for all four years. For example, freshmen students only get to choose 3 classes out of 10 classes they attend their first semester.

Students who share the same specialized course form a Class, and the Class remains the same until they graduate. Students in a Class usually attend the same lectures (except few selective ones)and participate in other activities together for 4 years.

While this has some disadvantages, such as a limited opportunity for broader social engagement, students often form a tight cohort within their class. This cohort is advantageous, as the students will often go into the same highly-specialized field of education.

== Controversies ==
SNUE made headlines when President Song Kwang-yong was quoted in the October 28, 2009 edition of The Korea Times as claiming that teachers from Western nations "are not qualified and are often involved in sexual harassment and drugs". Song later clarified that the quote was fabricated by Kang Shin-who, a journalist who has been previously criticized for misquoting interviewees or fabricating quotes.

== See also ==
- List of national universities in South Korea
- List of universities and colleges in South Korea
- Education in Korea
