= Kim Se-hwang =

South Korean guitarist, singer-songwriter

- Also known as: James Kim
- Born: 김세황; November 16, 1971 (age 54); South Korea
- Genres: Pop; rock; classical
- Occupations: Guitarist; singer-songwriter; arranger
- Instruments: Guitar
- Years active: 1991–present
- Formerly of: N.EX.T, NovaSonic, 2Cell
- Website: kimsehwang.com

Kim Se-hwang (Korean: 김세황; born November 16, 1971) is a South Korean guitarist, singer-songwriter and arranger. In 1991, he formed Downtown, a rock group, and produced their self-titled debut album in 1993. He was a member of the rock band N.EX.T, which he joined in 1994, the metal band NovaSonic and the rock band 2Cell. In 2011, he produced the album Vivaldi: The Four Seasons, reinterpreting portions of The Four Seasons with an electric guitar. In 2014, he became the first Korean artist to have his guitar displayed in the Guitar Center store in Hollywood, at "Hollywood's RockWalk", a hall of fame honoring musical artists.

== Life and career ==
=== Early life in the U.S. ===
Kim was born in South Korea and started playing guitar when he was 4 years old, with his first introduction from his mother who had been a classical guitarist. His father was a South Korean diplomat and the family was stationed in Washington, D.C. from 1974 to 1986. Although his mother gave up her career after marrying, she continued to promote South Korean culture through performances at diplomatic soirees, including at the Smithsonian, and continued to teach and share classical music with him at home. She also liked 70's guitar music such as Santana and Jeff Beck and made music education a part of Sehwang's childhood. He said he grew up in a family environment "filled with a desire for unification" because his father was from Hamhung, a city in North Korea, which helped him develop his personality as a musician who seeks a peaceful consensus.

He returned to South Korea in 1986, after twelve years in America, and started his career in the early nineties.

=== N.EX.T and other bands ===
He debuted with his own rock band named "Downtown" in 1991. The other members were bassist Jung Han-jeong and drummer Lee Chang-hyun. Sehw produced their album DOWNTOWN in 1993. In 1994, N.EX.T's lead singer and founder Shin Hae-chul met with him and invited him to join his band as a guitarist. He accepted the offer and remained with them until they disbanded in early 1998. That year, 1998, he formed the metal band NovaSonic with two other N.EX.T members, Kim Seung-hwan and Lee Su-yong and joined by rapper Kim Jin-pyo. He remained with them until 2005. He rejoined N.EX.T when they regrouped in 2005, and remained with them until 2012. Also, during N.EX.T's hiatus, he played in the rock band 2Cell; and performed on albums for all three bands.

Kim remembers favorite performances with N.EX.T, rehearsing at the Royal Albert Hall, giving concerts in South Korea with the Royal Philharmonic Orchestra and recording N.E.X.T's 1997 album Lazenca (A Space Rock Opera) with the London Symphony Orchestra. He performed with the band again on August 8, 2015, for their last appearance at the Pentaport Rock Festival, along with band members Kim Young-seok and Lee Su-yong, and other musicians, for a special post-humous tribute to their leader Shin Hae Cheol, who had died on October 27, 2014.

=== Performances and collaborations ===
He has performed and collaborated with musicians including Joe Lynn Turner and Deep Purple, Stuart Hamm, Scott Henderson, Guthrie Govan, Martin Taylor, Akira Jimbo, Steve Vai, Loudness, Lee Ritenour and Vinnie Moore.

He has also performed for and represented brands such as Orange Amp, Yamaha, Boss, Roland, D'Addario, Carvin, EMG, Tronical, Suhr Guitars and Gibson.

=== Classical music ===
He expanded his musical career with a crossover between rock and roll and classical music on June 23, 2011 with the release of his album Vivaldi: The Four Seasons with the Seoul Philharmonic Orchestra. He said he had always liked Vivaldi's concerto, which he often heard his mother play, as a child. He kept postponing attempting it himself until his interest was revived in May 2010 when he performed a duet on the SBS program Stocking with electronic violinist Eugene Park, who also played the legendary concerto. Then on October 24, 2010, he made his classical debut at Sejong Center for the Performing Arts when he performed the "Winter" movement of "The Four Seasons" with violin and cello. He described preparing for the album, practicing twelve hours a day with the passion of middle schooler learning guitar. He said he wanted to mitigate the difference between the sound of the violin, which has no breaks, with the guitar, which is quite different. On the album he used his Suhr "Kim Se-hwang Modern Custom" guitar, custom-made for him by the company, to his specifications, after he joined them as an endorser in 2010.

A year later, in June 2012, he performed Luis Bacalov's "Concerto Grosso" for I Musici's 60th Anniversary during their South Korean tour.

=== Television and public appearances ===
In addition to performing on musical programs, he appeared on television as a judge for KBS's 2012 Top Band Season 2 and MBC Music's 2014 Green Song Contest. From the fall of 2015 through January 2016, he was an original cast member of Knowing Bros, his debut performance on an entertainment show. The show's production team referred to him as "one of the three biggest guitarists in Asia" during one episode.

On August 9, 2012 he performed and served as an events judge with other musicians for mentally disabled musicians at the "Pyeongchang Special Music Festival", in commemoration of the 2013 Special Olympics World Winter Games. Additionally he served as a judge on the Ministry of Unification's music contest "Uni Music Race 2016 (UMR2016)".

=== Lectures and music education ===
He lectures on music and the philosophy of music and has been a practicing music instructor at Dongduk Women's University, the faculty at Seoul Arts College (SAC), the faculty at Kimpo University (beginning in 2016), and Hanyang University's Social Education Center.

== Style and influences ==
He has described his inspirations as a long list of "Guitar Gods" that increases daily, including Jimi Hendrix, Eric Clapton, Jeff Beck, Led Zeppelin, Deep Purple, AC/DC, Santana, B.B. King, Prince, Eddie Van Halen, Steve Lukather, Def Leppard, and more.

Guitarist Stuart Hamm compares his sound to Joe Satriani and Steve Vai.

== Honors and awards ==
In 1997, he received an endorsement guitar, a sky-blue "P4 limited" from Washburn Guitars, which to his knowledge, was the first for a South Korean instrumentalist from a western company. He was the first Korean performer at the NAMM Show in Anaheim, California in 2013 In 2014, he donated his signature red Yamaha Pacifica Artist Custom "Kim Se Hwang" guitar for display at the Guitar Center store when he was inducted into "Hollywood's RockWalk", alongside those of guitarists Eddie Van Halen, Steve Lukather, Kirk Hammett and Slash, among others. In May 2014, he was the first Asian to receive an "Honorary Doctorate of Music in Performance" from the Musicians Institute in Hollywood. In May 2016, he was appointed as the first Korean artist to represent the guitar brand Gibson.

== Personal ==
On January 12, 2008 he married Jeong Ae-Hwa, a twenty-eight-year old corporate designer, to whom he had been introduced by friends in 2000. They have a daughter and son. On November 20, 2014, he performed in a parents' concert at his daughter's kindergarten.

== Discography ==
=== Downtown ===
- DOWNTOWN (1993)

=== NovaSonic ===
- NOVASONIC (1999)
- NOVASONIC 2 (2000)
- NOVASONIC 3 (2001)
- 4th House Han (2003)

=== 2Cell ===
- 2Cell (2004)

=== Studio albums ===
- Vivaldi: The Four Seasons (2011)

=== Singles ===
- "Nostalgia" SM Station Season 2, with Jungmo (2016)
- "DCT(Dreams Come True) feat. Simon Phillips, Stuart Hamm (2017)
- "WE NEED A CHANGE" by Linah London (feat. Sehwang Kim, Karl Kula) (2018) (YouTube) → The song was ranked No.10 on the UK Pop Club Chart, Feb 15 2019.

== Filmography ==
Year	Title	Role	Network	Note(s)
2015-2016	Knowing Bros	Cast	JTBC	Episodes 1-7
