= Yamaha RGX =

Electric guitar series

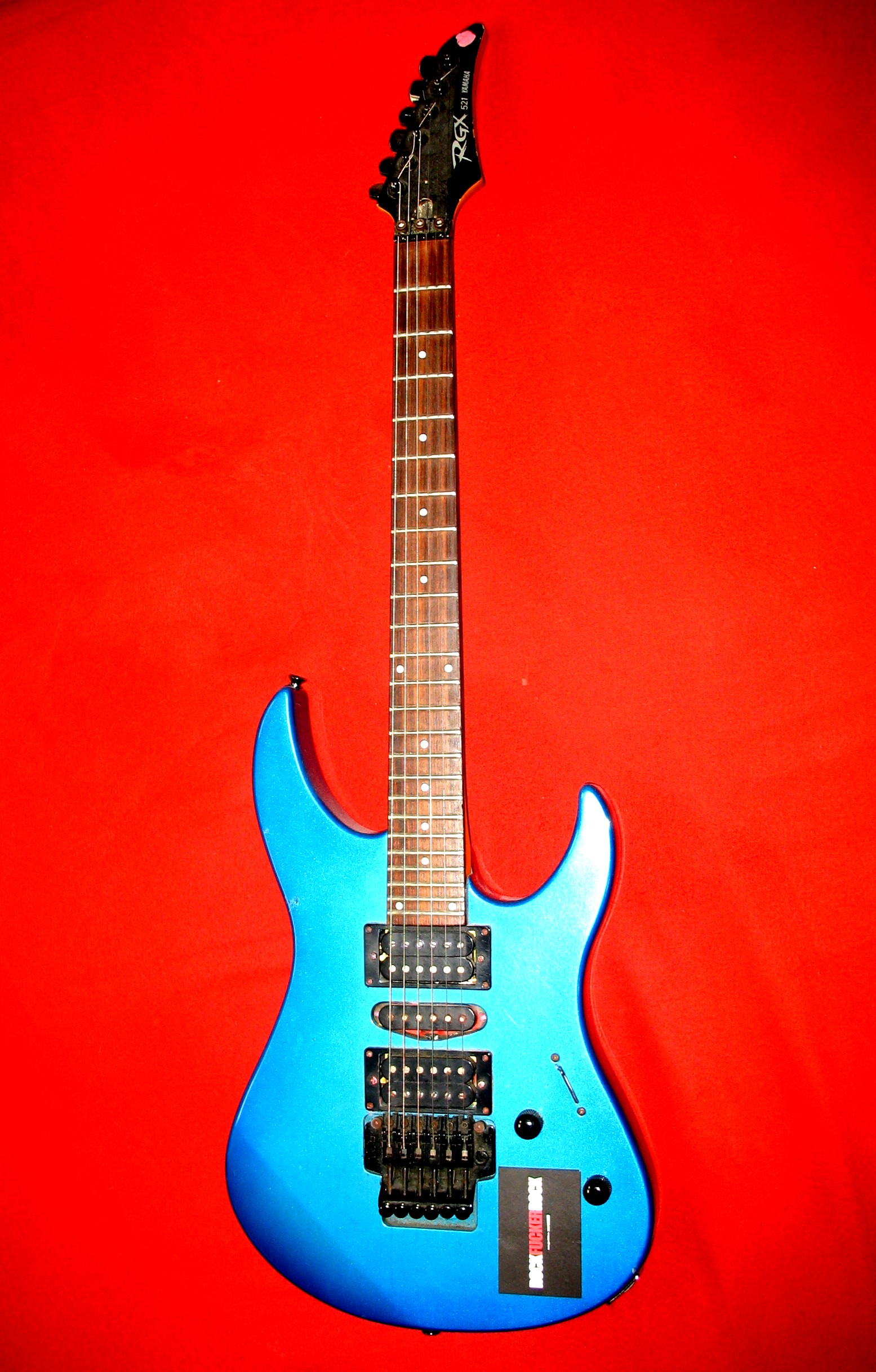
- Yamaha RGX521D guitar
- Manufacturer: Yamaha
- Period: 1987

Construction
- Body type: Solid
- Neck joint: Bolt-on or neck-through

Hardware
- Bridge: locking vibrato
- Pickup: H-S-H

The Yamaha RGX and RGZ electric guitars Series are manufactured by the Yamaha Corporation and bear a close resemblance to the Ibanez RG series, the Jackson Soloist and other "superstrat" enhanced copies of the Fender Stratocaster. These Taiwan-made instruments were introduced in 1987.

RGX Series guitars often have 24 or more frets and a bolt-on neck. Some high-end models use a neck-through-body design. Some come with Yamaha active pickups, in HSS (humbucker/single coil/single coil), HH (dual humbuckers) and HSH (humbucker/single coil/humbucker) configurations.

Most of these instruments were generally known as RGZ, including the RGZ820R, a custom green, red and black plaid (often referred to as "watermelon plaid") graphic model initially with a Yamaha "RM-II locking vibrato" licensed Floyd Rose tremolo and later a Takeuchi TRS-Pro Licensed Floyd Rose tremolo and Yamaha's own "Rockin' Magic Pro II" tremolo. Some RGZ models are often retrofitted with Seymour Duncan Parallel Axis Trembucker humbucking pickups (though they came with Yamaha-branded pickups), played by rock guitarist Blues Saraceno.

The RGX guitars were upgraded in 2003 with a 3D headstock sporting a 3+3 tuner layout and a piezo bridge option for acoustic-like tones. Famous endorsees of the RGX/RGZ guitars included Blues Saraceno and Ty Tabor of King's X, who got his namesake RGX-TT and RGX-TTD6 signature models in 2000.

== See also ==
- Yamaha electric guitar models
- Superstrat
