= List of Yamaha guitars =

This is a list of guitars manufactured by the Yamaha Corporation.

== List of guitars ==
- 10
- 102
- 112
- 1212 - Dates of manufacture: 1994 - Manufacture of the 1212 began in 1994
- 1221 - Dates of manufacture: 1994 - Manufacture of the 1221 began in 1994
- 1221 M - Dates of manufacture: 1994 - Manufacture of the 1221 M began in 1994
- 1221 M S - Dates of manufacture: 1994 - * made the first 1221 M S in 1994
- 1221MS
- 1230
- 1230 S
- 1412
- 15
- 1511
- 302s
- 310
- 460S 12str
- 812 S
- 812W
- 821
- 904
- 912 J
- A1M
- A1R
- A3M
- A3R
- AC1M
- AC1R
- AC3M
- AC3R
- AE 11
- AE 1200 S
- AE 500
- AE1200
- AE18
- AE2000
- AE2000S
- AE500
- AES 1500
- AES 1500 B
- AES 1500 B (New)
- AES 420
- AES 500
- AES 520
- AES 620
- AES 620
- AES 620HB
- AES 720
- AES 800
- AES 800 B
- AES 920
- AES AD6 AMIR DERAKH SIGNATURE
- AES FRANK GAMBALE SIGNATURE MODEL
- AES RS7 RYAN SHUCK SIGNATURE
- AES1500
- AES1500-B
- AES420
- AES500
- AES620
- AES620HB
- AES620SH
- AES630
- AES720
- AES800
- AES800-B Bigsby
- AES820
- AES820D6
- AES920
- AES-FG Frank Gambale Signature Guitar
- AEX 1500 Martin Taylor Hybrid Guitar
- AEX 500
- AEX 500 N(2)
- AEX 502
- AEX 520
- AEX 520
- AEX-500
- AEX-500N
- AEX-500N2
- AEX-500S
- AEX-502
- APX 4A
- APX 6A
- APX 700 12 NT
- APX 700II 12
- APX SPL I
- APX SPL II
- APX-10
- APX-20C
- APX-3
- APX-4ASPL
- APX-4-12
- APX-5
- APX-5 CBS
- APX-5A
- APX-5-12A
- APX-5NA
- APX-6
- APX-6LA
- APX-6NA
- APX-7A
- APX-7C
- APX-8
- APX-8-12C
- APX-9-12
- APX-9C
- APX-9N
- APX-9NA
- AS800
- C40 Classical.
- C45
- C80
- CD-110CE
- CG-100
- CG-100 A
- CG-101
- CG-110
- CG-110 A
- CG-111 C
- CG-111 S
- CG-120 A
- CG-130 A
- CG-150 CA
- CG-150 CCA
- CG-150 CCE
- CG-150 S
- CG-150 SA
- CG-151 C
- CG-151 S
- CG-170 CA
- CG-170 SA
- CG-171 S
- CG-171 SF
- CG-180 S
- CG-180 SA
- CG-192
- CG-201S
- CG-510CA
- CG-60A
- CG-90-MA
- CGX-101
- CGX-111SC
- CGX-111SCA
- CGX-171CC Classical Guitar
- CGX171CCA
- CGX-171SCF
- CJ-12
- CJ-818
- CJ-838S
- CJX-12S
- CLASSIC
- CN525E
- CPX10
- CPX15
- CPX15A
- CPX15AD
- CPX15CM
- CPX15E
- CPX15S
- CPX15W Compass West
- CPX5
- CPX700-12 NT
- CPX700II-12
- CPX8
- CPX8-12 12-String
- CPX8-SY
- CPX900
- CPXW
- CSF-35
- CSF-60
- CUSTOM
- CV820WB Wes Borland Signature
- D120
- DW-20
- DW-4S
- DW-4S-12
- DW-4SC
- DW-4T
- DW-5S
- DW-6
- DW-7
- DW-8
- DW7-12
- DW15
- DWX-7C ABS
- DWX-8C
- Dynamic Guitar No. 15
- Dynamic Guitar No. 20
- EC-10 Eterna
- EC-12 Eterna
- EF-10
- EF-15 Eterna
- EF-35 Eterna
- EG-012
- EG-112
- EG-112C
- EG-303
- EGK-300
- ERG-121
- ERG-121C
- ET112
- EZ-AG
- EZ-EG
- F-210
- F-310
- F-310PKG
- F-325
- F-335
- F-340
- F-340BL
- F-35P
- F-360
- F-36S
- F-370
- FD01S
- FD-02
- FG Junior
- FG-04LTD
- FG-1000
- FG-110
- FG-110-1
- FG-110E
- FG-122
- FG-140
- FG-150
- FG-1500
- FG-160
- FG-160
- FG-160-1BK Special Edition
- FG-160E
- FG-170
- FG-180
- FG-200
- FG-2000
- FG-230
- FG2500
- FG-260
- FG295S
- FG-300
- FG-312
- FG-325
- FG-330
- FG-331
- FG335
- FG-335E
- FG-335II
- FG-336SB
- FG-340
- FG-345
- FG-350
- FG-350D
- FG350F
- FG-350W
- FG-351SB
- FG-360
- FG-365
- FG-365S
- FG-365SII
- FG-375S
- FG-375SII
- FG-400
- FG-400A
- FG-401
- FG-402
- FG-402MS
- FG-403S
- FG-403MS
- FG-410A
- FG-410EA
- FG-411
- FG-411 12
- FG-411C-12
- FG-411CE
- FG-411-SC
- FG-411SCE
- FG-412 12 string
- FG-412 BL
- FG-412L
- FG-412S
- FG-412SB 12-String
- FG-413S
- FG-413S 12-String
- FG-420
- FG-420-12
- FG-420-12A
- FG-420CE
- FG-420E-12
- FG-420E-12A
- FG-422 OBB
- FG-423S
- FG-430
- FG-432S
- FG-433S
- FG-435
- FG-435A
- FG-440
- FG-441S
- FG-450S
- FG-450SA
- FG-460S
- FG-460F-12
- FG-460-SA
- FG-461S
- FG-465
- FG-470S
- FG-480S
- FG-502
- FG-502M
- FG-512 12-String
- FG-512II
- FG-580
- FG-612S 12-String
- FG-700
- FG700S
- Fg700S
- FG-720S 12-string
- FG-730S
- FG-75
- FG-750S
- FG-75-1
- FG-830
- FGB1
- FGS-345
- FGX-04 LTD
- FGX-412
- FGX-412C-12
- FGX-412C-12 BL
- FGX-412C
- FGX-412C-MAB
- FGX-412S
- FGX-412SC
- FGX-413SC
- FGX-413SC-12
- FGX-423SC-12 BL
- FGX720SCA
- FGX-B1
- FJ-645
- FJ-681 Jumbo
- FN-575E
- FPX-300
- FS-3
- FS-5
- FSX-3
- FSX-5
- FS-100C
- FS-310
- FS-350S
- FS-413S
- FS-500SJ
- FS-720S
- FS-800
- FS-800C
- FX-200
- FX-310
- FX-335
- FX370C
- FZ-1000
- G10
- G120A
- G130A
- G-130A
- G170A
- G-225 Classical
- G-228 Classical
- G-231 Classical
- G-231 II Classical
- G-235 Classical
- G-235 II Classical
- G-240 Classical
- G245-S
- G250-S
- G255-S
- G50 Classical Guitar
- G50A
- G55 Classical
- G55A
- G65A
- G80-A Classical
- G85A
- G90-A Flamenco Classical Guitar
- GC-15D
- GC-3 Classical
- GC-30
- GC-30C Classical Handcrafted
- GC-3D Classical
- GD-10
- GD-10-C Classical Handcrafted
- GD20-C Classical
- GL-1
- GLX-1
- Image Custom
- Image Standard
- Kyle May Signature
- L-10A
- L-15A Handcrafted
- L-20A Handcrafted
- L-25A Handcrafted
- L-5A
- L-8S
- LA-8
- LD-10
- LD-10E
- Les Paul Copy
- LJ16
- LJX6C
- LL-11
- LL-11E
- LL-16
- LL-1E
- LL-25-12
- LL-26
- LL-35
- LL36
- LL56
- LL-400
- LL500
- LL500 CX
- LL-6
- LL-TA
- LLX-26 C
- LLX-400
- LLX6
- Lord Player
- Lord Player 400
- LS10
- LS10T
- LS16
- LS400
- LS500
- LS-TA
- LW-5
- MSG Custom
- MSG Deluxe
- MSG Standard
- No. 120 Nippon Gakki
- PAC 012
- PAC 120 S
- PAC 1511 MS MIKE STERN SIGNATURE MODEL
- PAC 302S
- PAC 303-12 12-STRING
- PAC 303-12 II
- PAC 311 MS
- PAC 312
- PAC 312 II
- PAC 412
- PAC 412V
- PAC 604 W
- PAC 612V
- PAC 812 W
- Pacific 112P
- Pacific 312 II
- Pacifica 012
- Pacifica 102
- Pacifica 102S
- Pacifica 112
- Pacifica 112J
- Pacifica 112L
- Pacifica 112M
- Pacifica 112MX
- Pacifica 112SX
- Pacifica 112V
- Pacifica 112X
- Pacifica 112XC
- Pacifica 120
- Pacifica 120S
- Pacifica 120SD
- Pacifica 1212
- Pacifica 1221
- Pacifica 1221M
- Pacifica 122L
- Pacifica 1230S
- Pacifica 1412
- Pacifica 1421
- Pacifica 1511 Mike Stern
- Pacifica 302S
- Pacifica 303-12 12 String
- Pacifica 311 Mike Stern
- Pacifica 311H
- Pacifica 312
- PACIFICA 402 S
- Pacifica 402S
- Pacifica 412
- Pacifica 510V
- Pacifica 512
- Pacifica 521
- Pacifica 604
- Pacifica 604W
- Pacifica 611HFM
- Pacifica 612V
- Pacifica 712
- Pacifica 721
- Pacifica 812V
- Pacifica 812W
- Pacifica 821D
- Pacifica 821DX
- Pacifica 821R
- Pacifica 904
- Pacifica 912
- Pacifica 921
- PACIFICA PAC 112
- PACIFICA PAC 112J
- Pacifica USA 1
- PACIFICA USA 1
- Pacifica USA 2
- PACIFICA USA 2
- PC-112
- PYO7092 MSG Standard
- RG-110
- RGX 120 D
- RGX 121 D (RGZ 121 P)
- RGX 121 S
- rgx 211
- RGX 220 DZ
- RGX 320 FZ
- RGX 320FZ
- RGX 420 S
- RGX 420 SD6 (Drop 6)
- RGX 421 D
- RGX 520FZ
- RGX 621 D (RGZ 621 P)
- RGX 820 R
- RGX 821 (821D)
- RGX Custom
- RGX Standard
- RGX-110
- RGX-112
- RGX-112P
- RGX-1200
- RGX-120D
- RGX-1212S
- RGX-121D
- RGX-121DM
- RGX-121S
- RGX-121Z
- RGX-1220A
- RGX-1220S
- RGX-1221S
- RGX-211M
- RGX-220
- RGX-312
- RGX-320FZ
- RGX-321D
- RGX-321FP
- RGX-321FP-R
- RGX-420 D6
- RGX-420S
- RGX-420S
- RGX-421 Pro
- RGX-421 Pro
- RGX-421D
- RGX-421D
- RGX-421DM
- RGX-421DM
- RGX-421DZ
- RGX-421DZ
- RGX-512J
- RGX-512J
- RGX-520DZ
- RGX-520DZ
- RGX-520FZ
- RGX-520FZ
- RGX-521
- RGX-521
- RGX-603a
- RGX-603S
- RGX-610M
- RGX-610M
- RGX-612
- RGX-612
- RGX-612A
- RGX-612A
- RGX-612S
- RGX-612S
- RGX-620S
- RGX-620S
- RGX-620Z
- RGX-620Z
- RGX-621D
- RGX-621D
- RGX-721DG
- RGX-721DG
- RGX-820DZ
- RGX-820DZ
- RGX-820R
- RGX-820R
- RGX-820Z
- RGX-820Z
- RGX-821D
- RGX-821D
- RGX-A2
- RGX-A2
- RGX-TT
- RGX-TT
- RGXTT TY TABOR SIGNATURE MODEL
- RGXTTD6 (Drop 6) Ty Tabor Signature Model
- RGZ 112P
- RGZ 321P
- RGZ 611M
- RGZ 612P
- RGZ 612PL
- RGZ Custom
- RGZ Custom
- RGZ-112P
- RGZ-112P
- RGZ-211M
- RGZ-211M
- RGZ-321P
- RGZ-321P
- RGZ-621
- RGZ-621
- RGZ-820R
- RGZ-820R
- RS320
- RS420
- RS502
- RS620
- RS720B
- RS820CR
- RSE20
- RSS02T
- RSS20
- RSP02T
- RSP20
- S-50 a
- SA 1100
- SA 2000
- SA 2100
- SA 2200
- SA 500
- SA 800
- SA 900
- SA1100
- SA1200S
- SA15
- SA2000
- SA2000s
- SA2100
- SA2200
- SA30
- SA30T
- SA500
- SA503 TVL
- SA503TVL
- SA-5
- SA50B
- SA700
- SA800
- SAS1500
- SAS-1500
- SBG 1000
- SBG 2000
- SBG 3000
- SBG 500
- SBG 500 B
- SBG 700 S
- SBG1000
- SBG1200
- SBG1300TS
- SBG200
- SBG2000
- SBG2100
- SBG300
- SBG3000
- SBG500
- SBG500B
- SBG700S
- SC 400
- SC 600
- SC-1000
- SC-1200
- SC-300T
- SC-400
- SC-700
- SC-800
- SE110
- SE1203A
- SE1212
- SE150
- SE200
- SE203
- SE211
- SE250
- SE300
- SE300H
- SE312
- SE312M
- SE350
- SE350H
- SE450
- SE603M
- SE612
- SE612A
- SE700E
- SE700HE
- SE700M
- SE903A
- SF1000 SuperFlighter
- SF500 SuperFlighter
- SF600
- SF700
- SG 500B
- SG 700S
- SG1000
- SG1000S
- SG-12
- SG1200S
- SG1300T
- SG1500
- SG1500S
- SG1996
- SG2
- SG-20
- SG200
- SG2000
- SG2000S
- SG2100S
- SG3
- SG-30
- SG300
- SG3000S
- SG-3C
- SG-40S
- SG400
- SG-450
- SG-45
- SG-5
- SG-50
- SG500
- SG500T
- SG5A
- SG600
- SG-60T
- SG-7
- SG-70
- SG700
- SG700S
- SG-7A
- SG-80T
- SG800
- SG85
- SGV 300
- SGV 500
- SGV 700 (Japan only)
- SGV 800
- SGV 1200 (Japan only)
- SGV Blue Jeans
- SH-01 Shouter
- SHB 400
- SHB400
- SJ-400S
- SJ 550 HR
- SJ-180
- SJ-500
- SJ-550HM
- SJ-800
- SL700C
- SLG100N Silent Guitar
- SLG100S Silent Guitar
- SLG130NW Silent Guitar
- SLG200N Silent Guitar (nylon string)
- SLG200S Silent Guitar (steel string)
- SLG200NW
- SPECIAL
- SR-500
- SSC 500
- SSC-500
- Studio Lord
- Studio Lord 380SL
- Studio Lord 450SL
- Studio Lord 600
- Studio Lord SL500
- Studio Lord SL800S
- Super RocknRoller 400
- Super Roknroller 500
- Super Roknroller 700
- Weddington Classic
- Weddington Custom
- Weddington Special
- X-40
- YG521
- YG521MR
- YG612
- YG612FP
- YG621
- YG621MR
- YG820DR
- YG821D
- YG821DMR
- YG1212
- YG1221MR
- YGF-410-12
- YSG

== See also ==
- Yamaha electric guitar models
- List of Yamaha signature instruments
- Superstrat
