= The Songs for the One =

Album by Shin Hae-chul

Studio album by Shin Hae-chul
- Released: January 29, 2007
- Recorded: 2006; Trackdown Scoring Stage, Sydney
- Genre: Jazz; big band; traditional pop
- Length: 49:17
- Language: English; Korean
- Label: Siren; Mnet Media
- Producer: Park Kwon-il

Shin Hae-chul studio album chronology
Monocrom (1999)	The Songs for the One (2007)

Shin Hae-chul major release chronology
Monocrom (1999)	The Songs for the One (2007)	Reboot Myself Part. 1 (2014)

The Songs for the One is the fifth studio album by South Korean musician Shin Hae-chul. It was released on 29 January 2007, under Siren Entertainment and distributed by Blue Cord Technology and Mnet Media. The album, a complete sonic departure from his previous works that were more rock-oriented, features mostly remakes of jazz and traditional pop songs in both English and Korean played by a big band, with the only new original song with lyrics being "Thank You and I Love You". The song was written by Shin (along with Yoon Chae and Peter Casey) in dedication to his wife who had given birth to their daughter the year before release.

== Background ==
Prior to the album's development, Shin was not known as a jazz enthusiast. He recalled wearing a bow tie and singing while listening to a mixture of Frank Sinatra, hard rock, and heavy metal — the last two genres were the kinds of music he had previously produced and released. Shin decided to release music inspired by big band orchestrations because the swing ensemble was his favourite.

Shin and his 28-member band practised for six months of preparation before participating in a simultaneous recording. They faced difficulty in recording in South Korea, so he flew to Sydney and finished sessions there in six days. Peter Casey had worked with Shin to create the album. Shin voluntarily gave up his roles in arranging the album and as the sole producer in favour of singing the lead.

Songs originally by Shin include "Inspiring Generation", "Thank You and I Love You" and "Jazz Cafe"; the latter was initially released as a song on his second studio album Myself in 1991. For promotion, Shin and his crossover band Seba held a performance titled "Shin Hae Chul Jazz scandal with seba" at the Centennial Memorial Hall of Yonsei University.

== Track listing ==
No.	Title	Writer(s)	Length
1.	"Inspiring Generation" (감격시대; instrumental)	Shin Hae-chul	1:03
2.	"L-O-V-E" (by Nat King Cole)	Bert Kaempfert; Milt Gabler	2:41
3.	"My Way" (by Frank Sinatra)	Claude François; Jacques Revaux; Paul Anka	3:31
4.	"A Thousand Dreams of You" (by Fats Waller)	Paul Francis Webster; Louis Alter	3:29
5.	"A Boarding Student" (하숙생; by Choi Hee-jun)	Kim Seok-ya; Kim Ho-gil	2:43
6.	"I Left My Heart in San Francisco" (by Tony Bennett)	George Cory; Douglass Cross	3:20
7.	"Moon River" (by Henry Mancini)	Mancini; Johnny Mercer	3:15
8.	"Rose" (장미; by April and May)	Kim Mi-seon; Park Soon-jin; Lee Jeong-seon; Oh Bong-joon	3:23
9.	"Somethin' Stupid" (by Frank and Nancy Sinatra)	C. Carson Parks	2:59
10.	"Thank You and I Love You"	Shin; Yoon Chae; Peter Casey	4:01
11.	"When October Goes" (by Barry Manilow)	Mercer; Manilow	4:09
12.	"Sway" (by Dean Martin)	Pablo Beltran Ruiz	3:47
13.	"A Song Dedicated to My Wife" (by Park Il-nam)	Jo Un-pa; Im Jong-soo	3:44
14.	"Jazz Cafe" (재즈 카페)	Shin; Casey	4:38
15.	"You Are So Beautiful" (by Joe Cocker)	Billy Preston; Bruce Fisher	2:34
Total length:			49:17

== Personnel ==
This list is derived from the album booklet.

- Shin Hae-chul – executive producer and lead vocals; songwriting ("Thank You and I Love You")

Session musicians

- Peter Casey – conducting
  - Paul Panichi, Simon Sweeney, Ralph Pyl, Paul Thorne – trumpet
  - Anthony Kable, Ben Gurton, Mark Barnsley – trombone
  - Colin Philpott – bass trombone
  - Mark Taylor – alto saxophone, clarinet, flute
  - Andrew Robertson – alto saxophone, clarinet
  - Graham Jesse, Adrian Cunningham – tenor saxophone, clarinet
  - Stephen Fitzmaurice – baritone saxophone, bass clarinet
  - Vanessa Park, Martyn Hentschel, Li Liu, Aeree Coward, Bing Xia, Dara Daly, Nicholas Parry – violin
  - Andrew Marciniak – violin, viola
  - Charlotte Roberts – violoncello
  - Casey Poon – strings manager
  - Gerald Masters – piano, keyboard
  - Jonathan Zwarts – bass
- Jim Pennell – guitar, nylon guitar
- Gordon Rytmeister – drums
- Tony Azzoparadi – percussion
- Chris Kamzelas – guitar
- Oh Hee-jung (Beautiful Days) – vocals (9)
- Lee Jung-in – vocals (10)
