= NEXT (South Korean band) =

South Korean rock band

- Origin: Seoul, South Korea
- Genres: Heavy metal; hard rock; progressive metal; alternative metal
- Years active: 1992–1997; 2003–2015
- Label: Danal Entertainment
- Past members: Shin Hae-chul; Jeong Gi-song; Lee Dong-gyu; Im Chang-su; Lee Su-yong; Kim Se-hwang; Kim Yeong-seok; Won San-guk; Devin Lee; Dr. Juny; Dong Hyeok; Ji Hyeon-su; Yun Te-ra; Jade; Kim Dan

NEXT (Korean: 넥스트; stylized as N.EX.T as an abbreviation for New EXperiment Team) was a South Korean rock band known for its provocative songs that critiqued social injustice. The band was formed by iconic Korean experimental rock singer Shin Hae-chul and debuted in 1992 with the album Home. NEXT went through several line-up changes over the years and has been inactive since Shin's death in 2014.

== History ==
NEXT (New EXperiment Team) was the band of singer/songwriter Shin Hae Chul (신해철). The group split up following the 1997 release of Lazenca: A Space Rock Opera, and the instrumentalists formed the alternative metal band Novasonic with rapper Kim Jun Pyo.

N.EX.T reformed around 2003 following the disbanding of Novasonic, and composed the soundtrack for the Korean release of Guilty Gear XX #Reload. A few of its instrumental songs were re-worked into songs with vocals on the following album, The Return Of N.EX.T Part 3: The Book of War/The Diary of a Soldier. The Return of N.EX.T Part 3 included the song "Dear America" which featured many prominent Korean vocalists such as Psy, Kim Jun Pyo and Crash's Ahn Heung-Chan. Guitarist Kim Se-hwang released his first solo album, Vivaldi: The Four Seasons, on June 27, 2011.

In 2014, group leader Shin Hae-chul died due to cardiac arrest after receiving poor medical treatment following a surgery where the surgeon illegally conducted a gastric bypass without patient consent. On August 8, 2015, the band made their last appearance at the Pentaport Rock Festival, along with other musicians, for a special memorial stage for Shin. Since then, NEXT has been considered to be on hiatus.

== Themes ==
NEXT's songs contain many cultural criticisms, with "Turn Off the T.V." and "Money" pointing to mediation and consumerism. Criticism of human disregard for the environment can be found in "Lazenca, Save Us" and "The World We Made," which creates musical contrasts between a pleasant, natural world and a terrifying, industrial, human-influenced world. "Cyber Budha Company Ltd." tells of a dark future in which humans can purchase small amounts of divinity through the use of machines and credit cards.

== Members ==
NEXT went through multiple line-up changes between 1992 and 2014.

- Shin Hae-chul (1992–2014) – vocals
- Jeong Gi-song (1992) – guitar
- Lee Dong-gyu (1992–1994) – drums, bass guitar
- Im Chang-su (1994) – guitar
- Lee Su-yong (1994–1997, 2006) – drums
- Kim Se-hwang (1994–1997, 2005–2014) – guitar
- Kim Yeong-seok (1995–1997, 2006) – bass guitar
- Won San-guk (2003–2005) – bass guitar
- Devin Lee (2003–2006) – guitar
- Dr. Juny (2003–2005) – drums
- Dong Hyeok (2003–2005) – keyboard
- Ji Hyeon-su (2006–2014) – keyboard
- Yun Te-ra (2007–2008) – drums
- Jade (2007–2014) – bass guitar
- Kim Dan (2008–2014) – drums

== Discography ==
=== Studio albums ===
Title	Album details	Peak chart positions	Sales
Title	Album details	KOR	Sales
Home	Released: June 1, 1992; Label: Jigu Inc., Danal Entertainment	—N/a	—N/a
The Return of N.EX.T Part I: The Being	Released: May 1, 1994; Label: Danal Entertainment	—N/a	—N/a
The Return of N.EX.T Part II: World	Released: September 15, 1995; Label: Daeyoung AV Co., Ltd., Danal Entertainment	—N/a	—N/a
Lazenca - A Space Rock Opera	Released: November 30, 1997; Label: Bugs	—N/a	—N/a
Guilty Gear XX #Reload Korean Version Original Sound Track	Released: November 6, 2003; Label: Team	-	-
The Return of N.EX.T Part III: Republic of Korea	Released: June 16, 2004; Label: Sony Music Entertainment (Korea) Inc.	6	KOR: 39,639+
ReGame?	Released: February 23, 2006; Label: Sony Music Entertainment (Korea) Inc.	15	KOR: 9,874+
666 Trilogy Part I	Released: December 9, 2008; Label: OGAM Entertainment	—N/a	—N/a

=== Compilation and live albums ===
Title	Album details
Live Concert Chapter 1	Released: May 25, 1995; Label: Danal Entertainment
Live Concert Chapter 2	Released: May 25, 1995; Label: Danal Entertainment
N.EX.T Is Alive [The World] Tour	Released: February 9, 1996; Label: Daeyoung AV Co., Ltd., Danal Entertainment
The First Fan Service: Live 2	Released: August 1, 1997; Label: EMI Records, Bugs

=== Soundtrack albums ===
Title	Album details
We Must Go To Apgujung-Dong On Windy Days	Released: 1993; Label: Danal Entertainment

=== Singles ===
Title	Year	Peak chart positions	Sales	Album
Title	Year	KOR	Sales	Album
"Here I Stand For You"	1997	—N/a	—N/a	Here I Stand For You single album
"I Want It All (Demo 0.7)"	2014	—	—N/a	Non-album single
"Cry"	2016	-	-	Cry OST
"—" denotes releases that did not chart.

== See also ==
- Shin Hae-chul
