= Yamaha Pacifica =

Series of electric guitar models from Yamaha

Pacifica
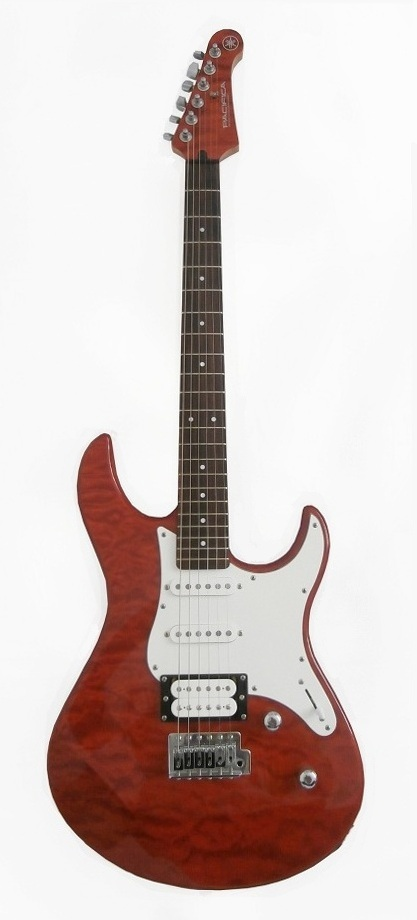
- Manufacturer: Yamaha
- Period: 1989–Present

Construction
- Body type: Solid
- Neck joint: Bolt-on or Set
- Scale: 25-1/2” (648 mm) average scale of Pacifica guitars

Woods
- Body: Agathis; Alder; Swamp Ash (vary on models)
- Neck: Maple
- Fretboard: Rosewood; Maple (vary on models)

Hardware
- Bridge: Vintage vibrato, Floyd Rose type vibrato, Wilkinson vibrato, or hard tail Tele (vary on models)
- Pickup(s): 1 humbucking and 2 single-coil pickups or 1 humbucking and 1 Hot Rails (vary on models)

Colors available
- Black, lake blue, metallic red, natural, old violin sunburst, and translucent green they vary on different models.

Yamaha Pacifica is the name of a series of electric guitars manufactured by Yamaha. The line was originally designed in Yamaha's California custom-shop by Rich Lasner, working with guitar builder Leo Knapp. Initially intended by Lasner and Knapp as a test project, Yamaha Japan chose to produce the instruments.

Many variants of the Pacifica have been produced since the 1990s, including twelve string models, carved-top and set-neck versions.

== Models ==
Pacificas all have one of two basic body shapes: a Stratocaster inspired double cutaway shape, or a Telecaster-like single cutaway. Apart from these similarities, the models vary in materials, hardware, and electronics. As of December 2009, there were currently 5 models in production.

The best-selling and most recognisable models are the entry-level PAC012 and PAC112. The 112 has a solid Alder body and has always been available with a clear varnish finish, showing the grain of the wood. At the time of the original launch this guitar was intended to compete with some of Fender's budget models. The entry level PAC012 has one Yamaha humbucker and two single coil pickups, an agathis body and a Strat-style vibrato bridge.

The early PAC1412 and PAC1421 models had set necks and carved tops with Floyd Rose locking vibrato bridges. These guitars were ultimately too costly to produce and hence too expensive for Yamaha's market. Other variations include the twelve-string PAC303 12, and the reversed headstock PAC721R.

The high-end PAC1511MS has a solid swamp ash body, with a Seymour Duncan humbucker neck pickup, and a Seymour Duncan "hot-rails" humbucker pickup in the bridge position, and a non-vibrato bridge with strings passing through the body. A more affordable version of the Mike Stern signature model Pacifica is the PAC311MS. Both are Telecaster-style guitars similar in shape, but in the case of the PAC311MS controls are slanted rather than on a chrome plate parallel to the strings and the M stands for Maple (neck) and the S for Singlecut as there also was a PAC311S with a rosewood neck. The 311MS and 311S were released in 1998 and production lasted only a couple of years. The 1511MS, however, remains in production. This illustrates how some Pacifica's were lower or higher priced versions of conceptually similar guitars.

The 904 model featured a Warmoth produced neck with a compound radius, locking Sperzel machine-heads, and a push-push tone control (like the 604W and 604V) that split the front dual single coil pickup into a single one. The Body was an ash slab top on an alder back and featured a highly engineered neck joint.

At the 2011 Frankfurt Musikmesse Yamaha announced the 611HFM, 510V and 311H models and the reintroduction of the 120H. The 120H is similar to the 112V, but features a hardtail, instead of a tremolo bridge, and a pair of humbucker pickups.

For the 2024 line-up, Yamaha introduced the Professional and Standard Plus models carrying a leading "P" and "S+" in the model number instead of a digit. Both feature stainless steel frets and "Reflectone" branded pick-ups. The Professional is placed as the flagship model, made in Japan with a 10" to 14" compound radius neck and additional processing of the body intended to improve resonance. The Standard Plus has a 13 3/4" single radius neck and is made in Indonesia. In a departure from the typical construction of S-type guitars, the new S+ and P models place the pickup selector and volume and tone potentiometers separate from the pick guard. The highest numbered model in the 2024 model year carries a leading 6.

Endorsers of the Pacifica guitars include Mike Stern, and Matteo Mancuso. The Mike Stern signature guitar is the PAC1511MS.

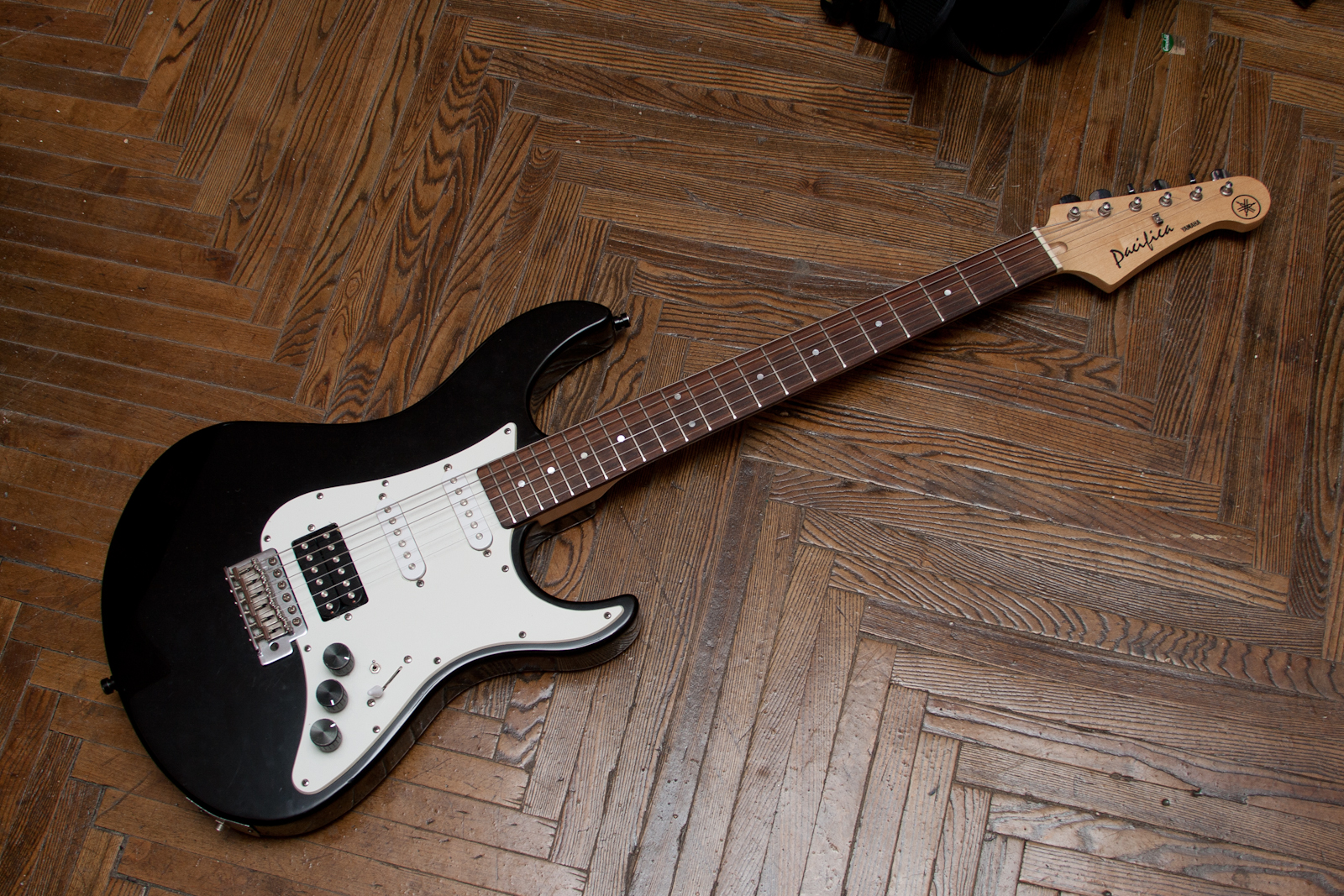
Pacifica 012BL

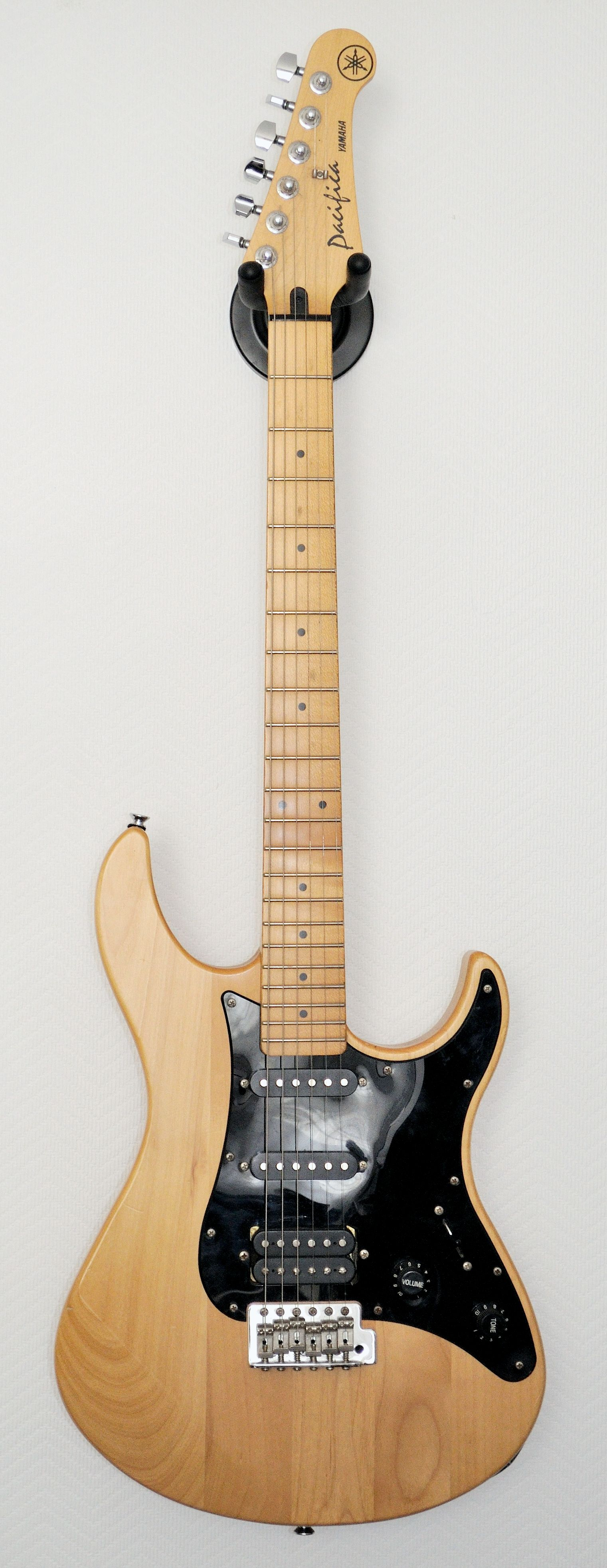
Pacifica 112

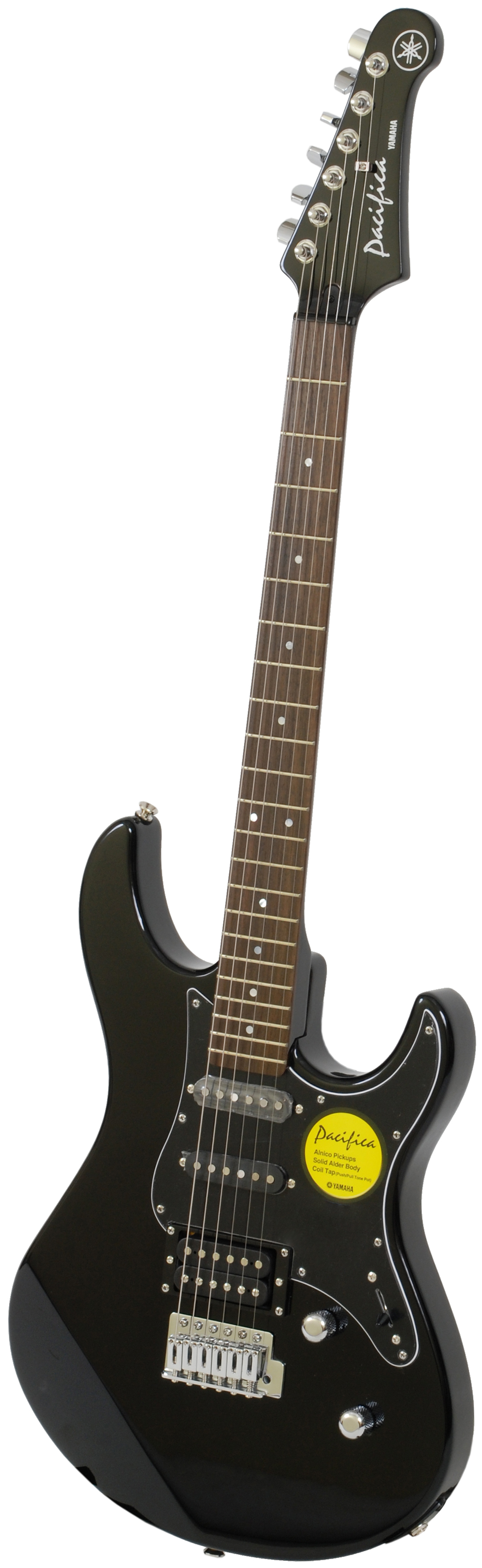
Pacifica 112VCX

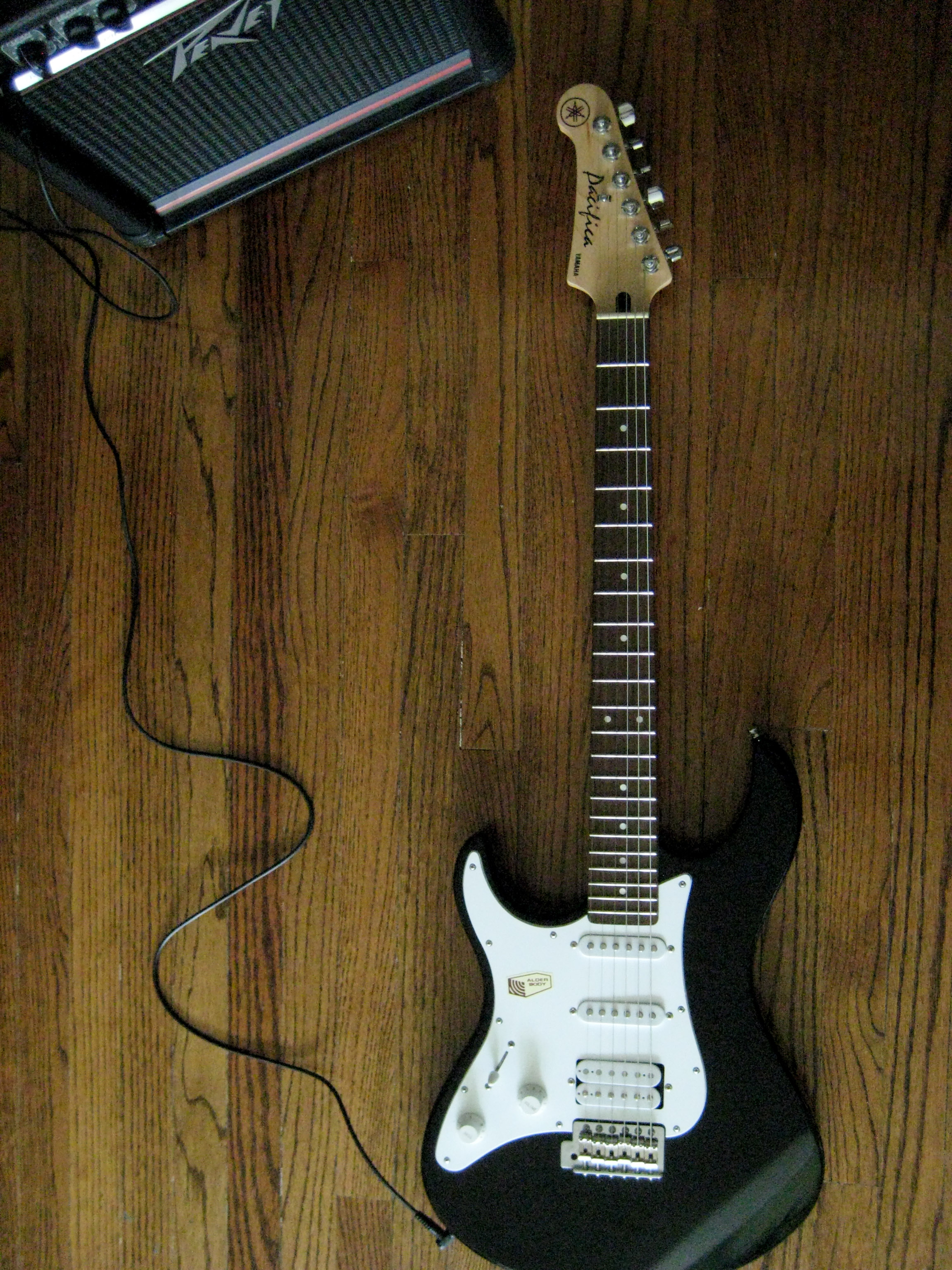
Pacifica 112JL

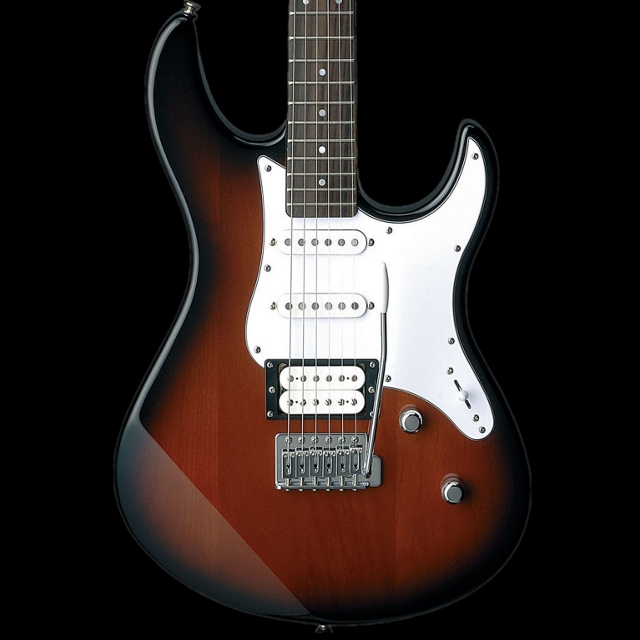
Pacifica 112V

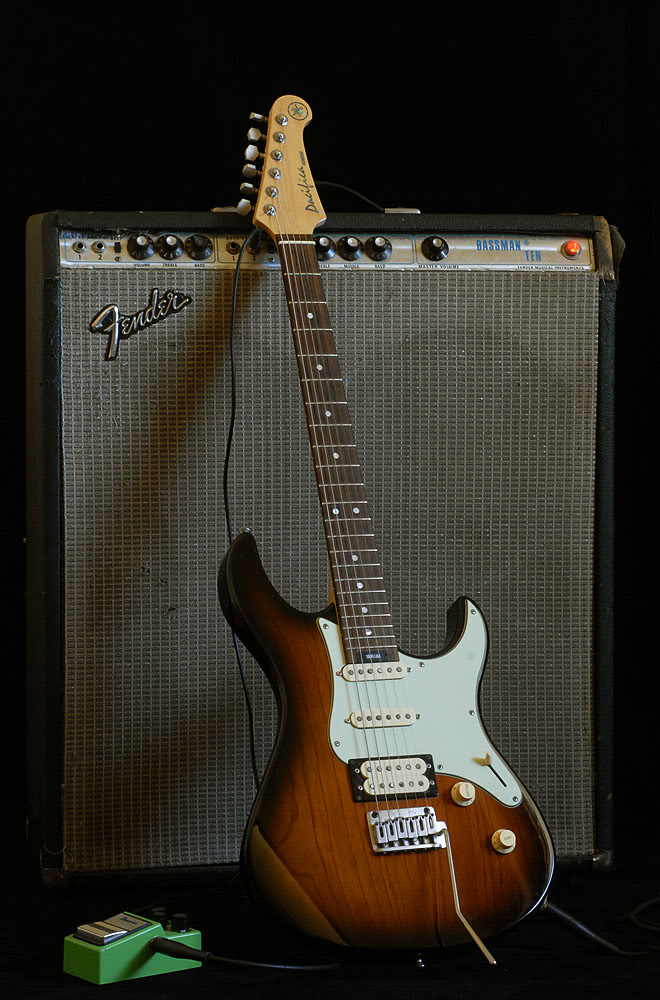
Pacifica 904

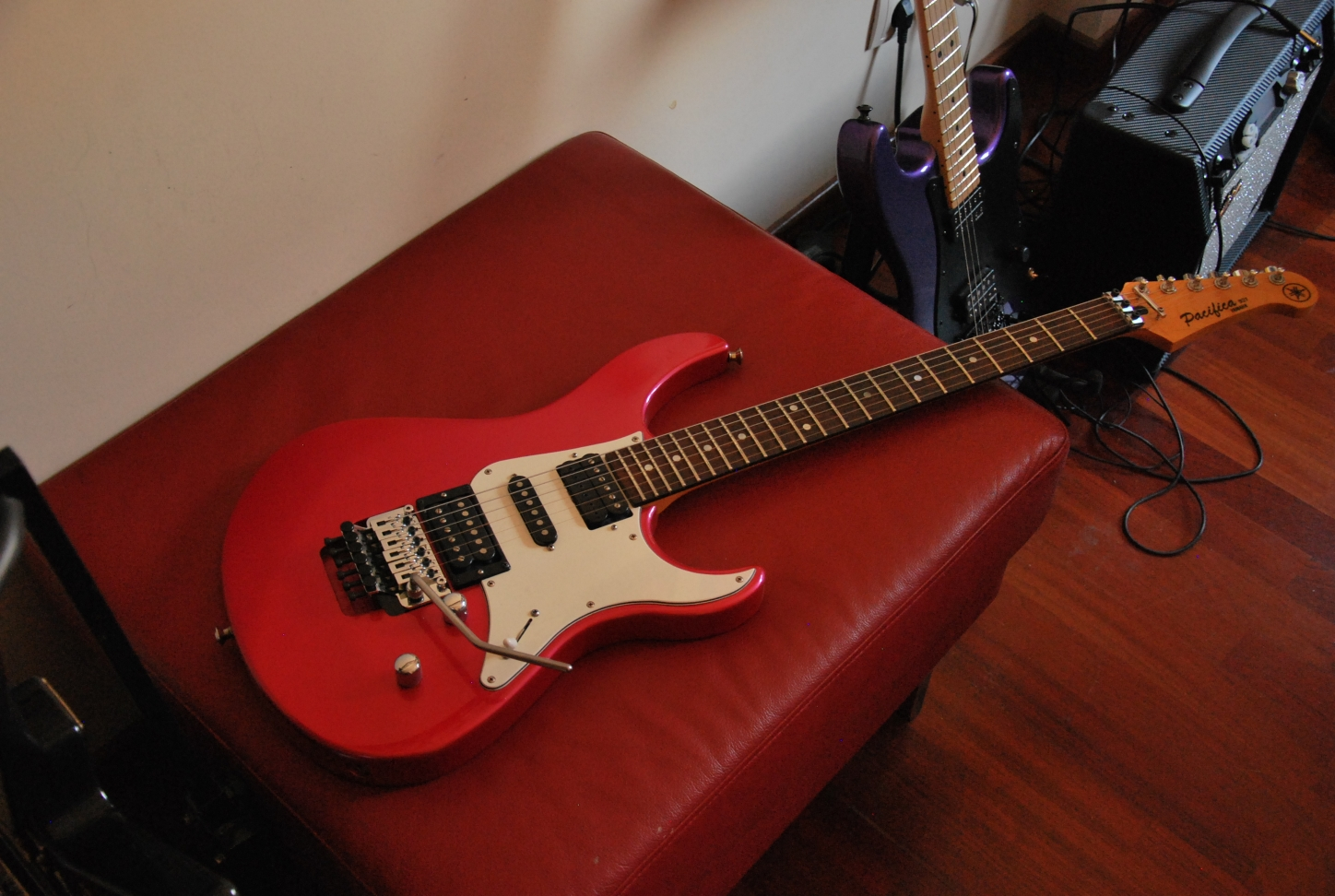
Pacifica 921 (1990)

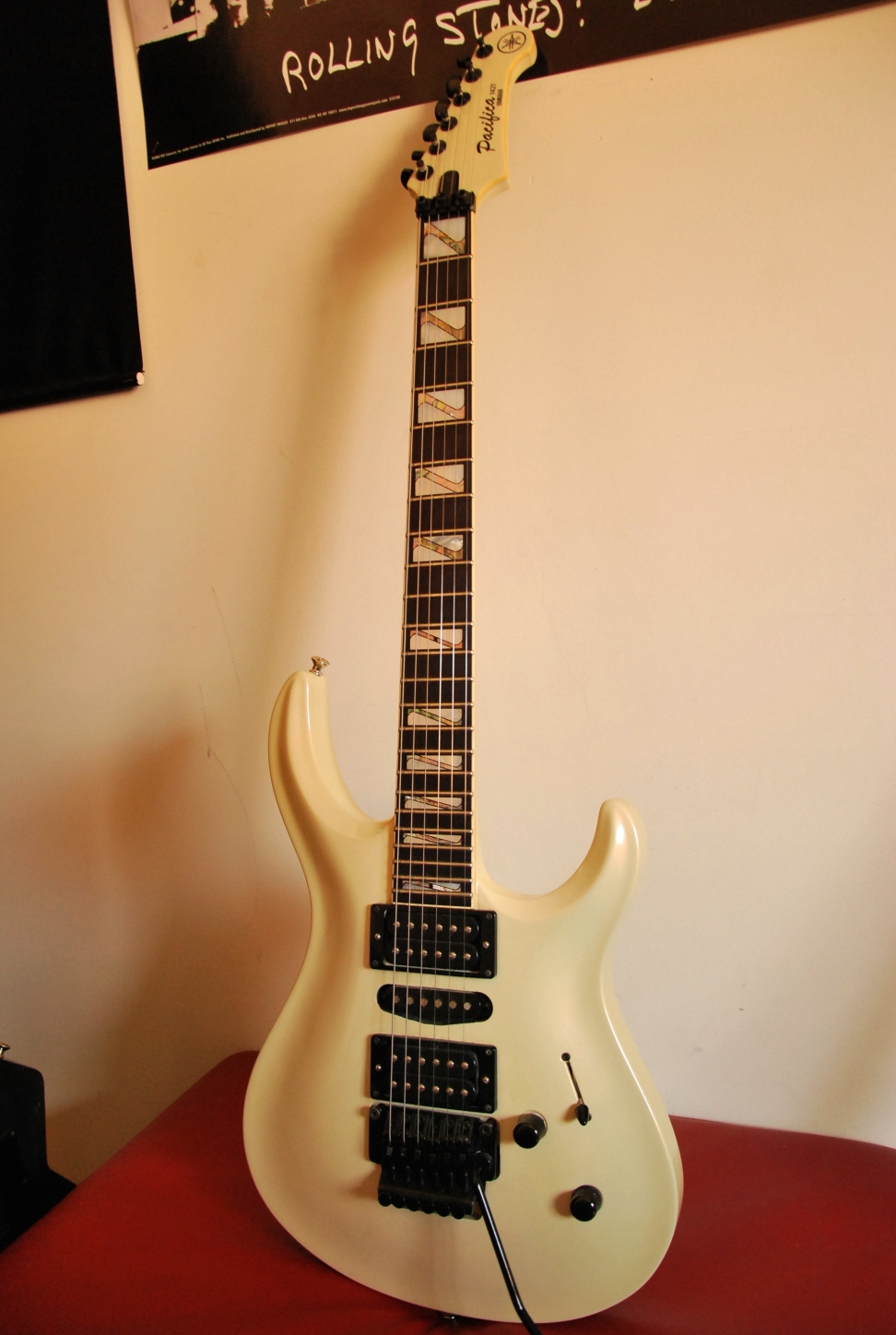
Pacifica 1421 (1991)

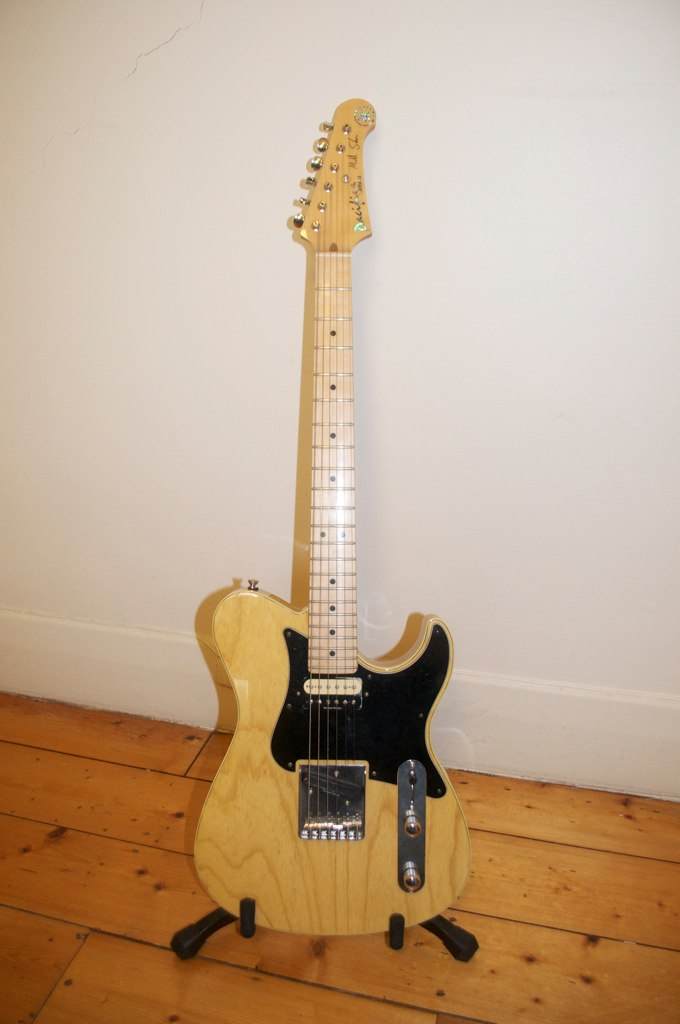
Pacifica 1511MS Mike Stern signature

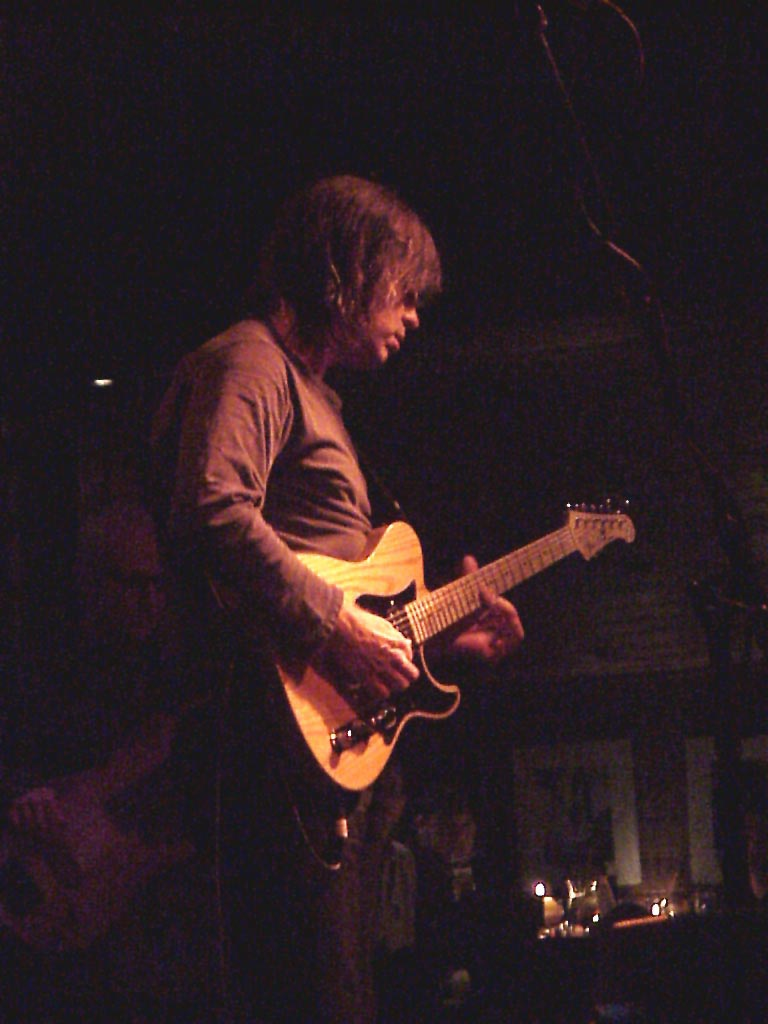
Mike Stern playing his signature model (2001)

== Model numbers ==
E.G. PAC112V

PAC - Identifies the series the guitar belongs to: PAC = Pacifica
112 - Identifies how “high end” the guitar is: 1 indicates basic parts, but an alder body
112 - Identifies how many humbuckers the guitar has (one by the bridge)
112 - Identifies how many single coils the guitar has (one at the neck; one in the middle)
V - Indicates other features: indicates the guitar is equipped with alnico-V pickups.

The first number loosely refers to the class/features of the guitar:
0 = Agathis
1 = Alder
2 = Alder, 2 Pc
3 = Alder, 2 Pc, Better Hardware
4 = Alder, 2 Pc, Better Hardware (Similar to 3?)
5 = Alder, 2 Pc, Better Hardware, Better Contours
6 = Alder, 2 Pc, Better Hardware, Better Contours, Aftermarket Pickups
7 = Alder, 1 Pc, Better Hardware, Better Contours, Aftermarket Pickups
8 = Alder, 1 Pc, Better Hardware, TANJ (Total Access Neck Joint), Aftermarket Pickups
9 = Alder, 1 Pc, Better Hardware, TANJ, SD Pickups, MIA, Warmoth Neck
10 = N/A
11 = N/A
12 = Alder, 1 Pc, Better Hardware, TANJ, SD Pickups, MIA, Set Neck
13 = N/A
14 = Alder, 1 Pc, Better Hardware, TANJ, SD Pickups, MIA, Neck-Thru
15 = (1511 Mike Stern Model)

Other Features:
J = Rosewood Fretboard (where Bubinga is also used)
V = Alnico-V pickups (2nd Generation Pacifica)
S = Single cut
W = Wilkinson tremolo
H = Hardtail (2nd Generation)
D = Alternative Body Shape
FM = Flamed Maple
QM = Quilted Maple
CX = Fancy Pick-guard
X = Ltd. Edition Yellow Satin
CP = Ltd. Edition Mirror Pick-guard and Decals
L = Left Handed
R = Reverse Headstock
MS = Maple Singlecut (311MS) or Mike Stern Model (1511MS,1611MS)
USA 1 = MIA models with single cutaway
USA 2 = MIA models with double cutaway
-12 = 12 String

== See also ==
- Yamaha electric guitar models
