= Yamaha electric guitar models =

Electric guitars by Yamaha

The Yamaha Corporation (ヤマハ株式会社, Yamaha Kabushiki Gaisha) is a multinational corporation and conglomerate based in Japan with a wide range of products and services, predominantly musical instruments, motorcycles, power sports equipment and electronics.

== Yamaha SG Series first era (1966–1971) ==
Yamaha began using the "SG" (solid guitar) prefix for their solid bodied guitars when they introduced their first solid-body model in 1966 and continued using the SG prefix up until 1981.

There were three SG eras - the first era SGs, lasting from 1966 to 1971, saw guitars with double cut-away bodies with similar features to the Fender Jazzmaster. These guitars had single digit suffixes - like SG-3, SG-5 and SG-7.

- SG3

Features: - the round Yamaha logo on the headstock is not a decal, it's a die cast metal piece with chrome tuning forks (the Yamaha logo) raised above a black background. You can turn it with your fingers on my guitar but it doesn't come off - you can also see in the picture that the Yamaha brand name appears on the neck plate. This is also chrome and black but is a stamping not a casting. And this isn't actually a neck plate because it doesn't hold the neck on. If you remove the four screws this plate comes off, you will then see the actual neck plate which has four larger screws holding the neck on. The neck plate has a rectangular "window" in it to allow you to access the truss rod through a hole through the body into the back of the neck (that's right, the truss is accessed through the back of the neck). - All three pickups are identical. They have adjustable pole piece screws. The black and silver areas that you see are actually the tops of the pickup bobbins themselves. The black and silver areas are covered by a domed clear plastic piece. I took the guitar apart a few years ago to give it a good cleaning. I found that the pickups are not held in place with springs at the height adjustment screws like normal pickups, but instead had a large foam rubber block under the body of each pickup. The fretboard is quite thin. Thin enough that the side dots are actually located on the split line between the fretboard material and the wood of the neck. The guitar's serial number is stamped directly into the fretboard between two of the lower frets. - Yamaha was obviously proud of this guitar, and put their name and logo all over it. Besides the Yamaha name on the tuning machines, it has the Yamaha decal and die cast logo on the headstock, the name and logo on the neck plate and the name and logo are molded into the bridge pickup ring between the two bridge pickups. - The SG2 and SG3 were Yamaha's first electric guitar models, and finish details (as described above) are amazing for a 1965 Japanese guitar. If I lay it down next to my Strat, the Strat looks like a bargain basement model by comparison. Later 1960s models in Yamaha's SG series have far cruder appointments. - As was already noted, the bridge has roller saddles and each saddle is height adjustable. The bridge also has the normal coarse height adjustment screws on each end. There are two sheet metal springs on the ends of the bridge pinching the saddles together so they don't move side-to-side. - The guitar shown here has either a metal or black plastic nut, mine is white plastic. There is, of course, a zero fret. - The string tree is also a good quality chrome plated die casting, not a metal stamping like many guitars of the period. - The main knobs are chrome-plated metal with plastic skirts. As for the roller controls, the mysterious 3rd thumbwheel nearest to the bridge pickup is a balance control for the two bridge pickups. This functions whether the slide switch is in the up or down position. - The remaining two thumbwheels are just like their Fender counterparts; they're a volume control and a tone control that override the main volume and tone controls when the slide switch is in the up position.

Supposedly most of them were sold in Japan, and only a few were exported to the US.

- SG5

Yamaha SG Series SG-5 Japan Available 1966 to 1971 Neck: Mahogany. Fingerboard: Rosewood. Number of Frets: 22. Scale Length: 24 ¾ inches. Options: Double Cutaway Bolt-On Neck Chrome Hardware 2 Volume Controls 2 Tone Controls 3-way Pickup Selector Switch

- SG7

The 6-string Yamaha electric guitar made in 1966 / 22 frets / Gold plated knobs and tunes / Weight: 3.5 kg ( 7.7 pounds ) / The entire length: 103 cm ( 40.5 inches ) / Color: Sunburst / The 3-way toggle switch is similar to the Mosrite Ventures model / A unique body shape / There is no other body shape like this one.

The SG7 was the first Yamaha electric guitar unleashed in 1966. Featuring a peculiar asymmetrical body with an elongated horn on the treble side and a hockey stick style headstock, the guitar was designed with the input of Japanese Eleki legend Takeshi Terauchi.

The SG7 was reissued in 2000 as the SGV300 in a range of finishes: Black, Canary Yellow, Metallic Red and Pearl Green. A deluxe SG800 model was also released in the same year. It’s become a modern surf classic.

== Yamaha RGX and RGZ electric guitars series ==
The Yamaha RGX and RGZ electric guitars Series are manufactured by the Yamaha Corporation and bear a close resemblance to the Ibanez RG series, the Jackson Soloist and other "superstrat" enhanced copies of the Fender Stratocaster. These Taiwan-made instruments were introduced in 1987.

RGX Series guitars often have 24 or more frets and a bolt-on neck. Some high-end models use a neck-through-body design. Some come with Yamaha active pickups, two single coils and one humbucker. The RGX series includes models with different pickup configurations and neck constructions.

Most of these instruments were generally known as RGZ, including the RGZ820R, a custom plaid graphic model with two humbuckers and a Floyd Rose licensed locking tremolo, played by rock guitarist Blues Saraceno. The series includes models with different pickup configurations and hardware specifications, reflecting variations across individual instruments.

The RGX guitars were upgraded in 2003 with a 3D headstock sporting a 3+3 tuner layout and a piezo bridge option for acoustic-like tones. Famous endorsees of the RGX/RGZ guitars included Blues Saraceno and Ty Tabor of King's X, who got his namesake RGX-TT and RGX-TTD6 signature models in 2000.

=== 1st RGX generation: 110, 211, 120D and 312 ===
- RGX 110

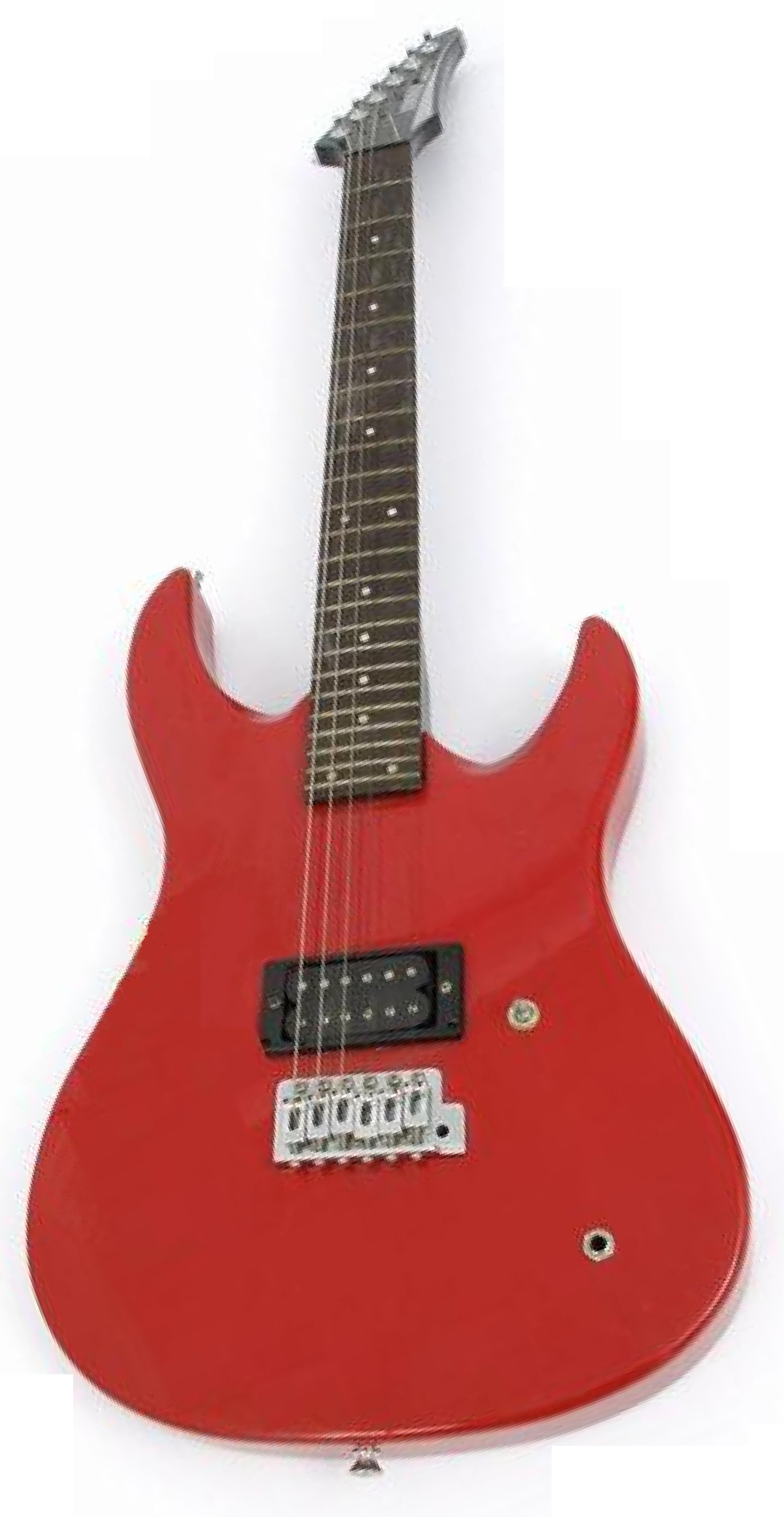
A RGX110 guitar.

Features one single Pickup: a humbucker, in the bridge. Its bridge was a non-licensed "Fender Synchronized tremolo"'s clone. It had 24 frets.

- RGX 120D

Features two humbucker pickups, one tone knob, one volume knob, and a three-way pickup selector.

- RGX 211

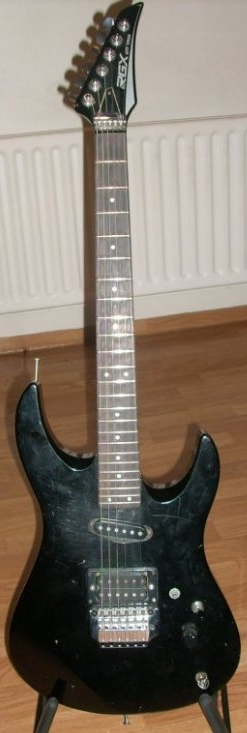
A RGX211 guitar.

Features H-S Pickup's layout design: a humbucker the bridge for fat lead tones and a single-coil in the neck, for treble (and traditional Stratocaster) tones. It had a version of Floyd Rose tremolo's bridge, and a 24 frets scale.

- RGX 312

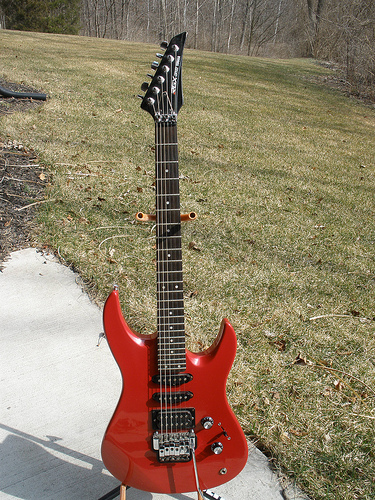
RGX312 guitar.

Yamaha RGX 312 models were produced from 1987 to 1993. Amazing versatility available from its H-S-S (humbucker/ single coil / single coil) pick-up configuration. The neck is straight with low action and a wide fretboard. The RGX312 (1987–1988) is a double cutaway rock style guitar available in Red, Black, or White finish.

Specifications:

Original List Price: $429.00

Neck - single coil Middle - single coil Bridge - Humbucker Construction:

- Alder Body
- Maple Neck
- Bubinga Fretboard

String length: 628mm Nut width: 41mm

- (1)Volume 250k
- (1)Tone 250k with coil splitter
- 5 way Selector
- Top mount input jack
- Bridge – Single locking (nut-side) Yamaha trem with fine tuners, based on the Floyd Rose tremolo system
- Fretboard – Bubinga
- Volume – 250k
- Tone – 250k with coil splitter
- 5 way Selector –
- Neck – single coil
- Middle – single coil
- Bridge – Humbucker
- 24 frets

The RGX312II (1988–1993) is a double cutaway rock style guitar available in Red, Black, White, or Silver Pearl finish. The guitar is set up with Yamaha pickups as follows:

Original List Price: $449.00

Neck - single coil

Middle - single coil

Bridge - Humbucker

Construction:

- Alder Body
- Satin Finish Maple Neck
- Bubinga Fretboard
- String length: 628mm
- Nut width: 43mm
- (1)Volume 250k
- (1)Tone 250k with coil splitter
- 5 way Selector
- Top mount input jack

=== 2nd RGX generation: 603a, 603s, 610m, 611m, and 612s (1987–1990) ===
All of these guitars have in common: a Basswood body, black Hardware (bridge, tuners etc.), double locking tremolo system, 24 fret neck, a half-painted headstock, 24 3/4" scale, and recessed input jack.

- RGX 603a
- RGX 603s

S-S-S pickup configuration

- RGX 610m
- RGX 611m

Satin finish three piece 24-fret bolt-on maple neck with maple fingerboard. RM-Pro vibrato system with pitch rise adjustment. Height-adjustable locking nut. S-H pickup configuration, with angled neck single coil. 3-way pickup selector switch w/ coil tap and three way tone(?) switch. Single 250k volume pot.

- RGX 612s

=== 3rd RGX generation ===
- RGX 120 D

Dates of manufacture: 1994 - 1998. Production of the RGX 120 D began in 1994 and ended in 1998. Features H-H Pickup's layout design: a humbucker in the bridge for fat lead tones, and another one in the neck, for traditional treble tones. Its bridge was a non-licensed "Fender Synchronized tremolo"'s clone. It had 22 frets.

- RGX 121 D (RGZ 121 P)

Manufactured by the same time of the RGX 120 D model, it's essentially the same guitar, but with a different pickup's layout design: H-S-H style. A humbucker the bridge for fat lead tones, a single-coil in the middle position for traditional Stratocaster tones and a humbucker in the neck, for treble tones. It had the same non-licensed "Fender Synchronized tremolo"'s clone bridge. It had 22 frets.

- RGX-420 DZ

Manufactured between 1994 and 1998, features H-H Pickup's layout design: a humbucker in the bridge for fat lead tones, and another one in the neck, for traditional treble tones. It had a version of Floyd Rose tremolo's bridge. It had 24 frets.

- RGX 421 D

YAMAHA produced the RGX 421 D between 1994 and 1998. Features H-S-H Pickup's layout design: a humbucker the bridge for fat lead tones, a single-coil in the middle position for traditional Stratocaster tones and a humbucker in the neck, for treble tones. It had a version of Floyd Rose tremolo's bridge. It had 24 frets.

- RGX 621 D (RGZ 621 P)

The RGX 621D was discontinued in 1995. The RGX 621D's pickups were directly mounted to the guitar's body. The RGX 621D model had a custom scalloped fretboard from the 20th to the 24th frets. This feature was intended to help fast and accurate fingering.

The RGX 621D had a Yamaha height-adjustable locking nut. This allowed players to customize the action and feel of their guitar based on playing style and string gauge preference.

The body was alder. The neck was maple, with 24 fret rosewood fingerboard.

Pickups were two humbuckers (neck and bridge positions) and one single coil (middle position). The controls were a five position pickup selector and master volume and master tone controls. The bridge was a TRS-Pro locking tremolo. All hardware was black chrome finished.

Finish options were Antique Sunburst Satin, Black, Blue Metallic, Red Metallic and Natural Satin

- RGX 820 R

The RGX 820 R was made between 1993 and 1995.

- RGX 821 (821D)

The RGX 821 was made between 1994 and 1996. The RGX 821 / 821D was one of the most expensive guitars in the Yamaha RGX series, selling for around $1000 when new. The RGX 821 pickups were directly mounted to the guitar's body. The RGX 821D and 621D model variants had custom scalloped fretboards from the 20th to the 24th frets. This feature was intended to help fast and accurate fingering.

The RGX 821D had a Yamaha height-adjustable locking nut. This allowed players to customize the action and feel of their guitar based on playing style and string gauge preference.

The body was alder with figured Veneer. The neck was maple, with 24 fret rosewood fingerboard.

Pickups were two humbuckers (neck and bridge positions) and one single coil (middle position). The controls were a five position pickup selector and master volume and master tone controls.

The bridge was a TRS-Pro locking tremolo. All hardware was gold plated.

Finish options were Antique Sunburst, Black Burst, Faded Blue and Violet Burst.

=== 4th RGX generation: the series at the 2000s ===
- RGX 121 S

YAMAHA began making the RGX 121 S in 2002

- RGX 420 S

The RGX 420 S was introduced in 2003. The Yamaha RGX 420 is an electric guitar that, so far, has been released two times in versions "S" and "dz", featuring different paint-finishes but all the same mechanics and electronics.

Features and specifications

- Body – alder or ash
- Neck – maple
- Bridge – traditional fulcrum or Floyd Rose-licensed locking vibrato
- Pickups – two Alnico humbuckers
- Frets – 24 jumbo
- Colors: Flat Black, Shelby Blue, Dark Grey Satin, Blood Red
- RGX 420 SD6 (Drop 6)

YAMAHA manufactured the RGX 420 SD6 (Drop 6) between 2001 and 2003

- RGX 320FZ

Dates of manufacture: 2005. The RGX 320FZ was introduced in 2005

- RGX 520FZ

YAMAHA began making the RGX 520FZ in 2005.

== RGZ Guitar Series ==
- RGZ 112P

A typical fat strat, this guitar features H-S-S (humbucker/ single coil / single coil) pick-up configuration and had a 22-fret, and a non-licensed "Fender Synchronized tremolo"'s bridge. Body with a Fender-style plastic pickguard.

- RGZ 321P

HSH pick-up configuration, alder body, 24-fret neck, and TRS-101 locking tremolo.

- RGZ 611M

Dates of manufacture: 1989 - 1991 The Yamaha 611M was a superstrat style electric with an alder body and bolt-on maple neck. It had a 24 fret maple fingerboard with black dot inlays. The lower part of the headstock was carved. It had superstrat style hardware finished in black, including a double locking Yamaha RM-Pro II tremolo system. Pickups were a diagonally mounted single coil at the neck and a humbucker at the bridge. Controls were a single volume knob, three-way pickup switch, coil splitter, two mini switches for the pickups. It came in red, black, white or yellow colors.

- RGZ 612P
- RGZ 612PL
- RGZ Custom
- RGZ Custom
- RGZ-211M
- RGZ-621
- RGZ-820R

== Pacifica Guitar Series ==
First launched in 1990, the Yamaha Pacifica series was driven by the California session scene of the day-where versatility, performance and individuality were key. The series has become one of the company’s best-selling entry-level electric guitars.

- notable models- Pac- 012,112J,112V
- PAC 1511 MS MIKE STERN SIGNATURE MODEL
- Pacifica PAC611HFM (hardtail) / Pacifica PAC611VFM (vibrato bridge)
- Pacifica 612V
- Pacifica USA 1

== RBX Bass Series ==
The RBX Series are the equivalent bass versions of the RGX line. Introduced in 1987, these Taiwanese-made basses came with active or passive circuitry, a variety of pickup configurations and the choice of 4-string, 5-string, fretted, fretless and left-handed versions. They featured a bolt-on 22 fret maple neck with a rosewood fingerboard and abalone dot inlays, a pointed headstock with 4-in line tuners (4+1 tuner layout on the RBX5 and RBX755A 5-strings), except for the RBX800 and RBX1000 which feature 24 frets and a deep-joint bolt on neck (just the RBX1000 had the deep-joint). Only the RBX550 and RBX600 came with an optional maple fingerboard with black dot position markers (RBX550M, RBX600M). The RBX range has been updated in 1998 with a new body style, a 3D headstock with 2+2 (4-string) or 3+2 (5-string) tuner arrangement and a two-octave rosewood fretboard. The RBX6JM and RBX-JM2 6-strings topped the line, endorsed by Dream Theater bassist John Myung, the latter using a single custom-wound Seymour Duncan SMB-6A humbucking pickup, black hardware, an active 3-band EQ and a 24-fret rosewood fingerboard with oval abalone dot position markers.

== See also ==
- List of Yamaha products#Guitars / Basses
- List of Yamaha guitars
- Yamaha Pacifica
- List of Yamaha signature instruments
- Fat strat
- Superstrat
- Ibanez
- Tagima
- Fernandes Guitars
