= Shin Hae-chul =

South Korean musician (1968–2014)

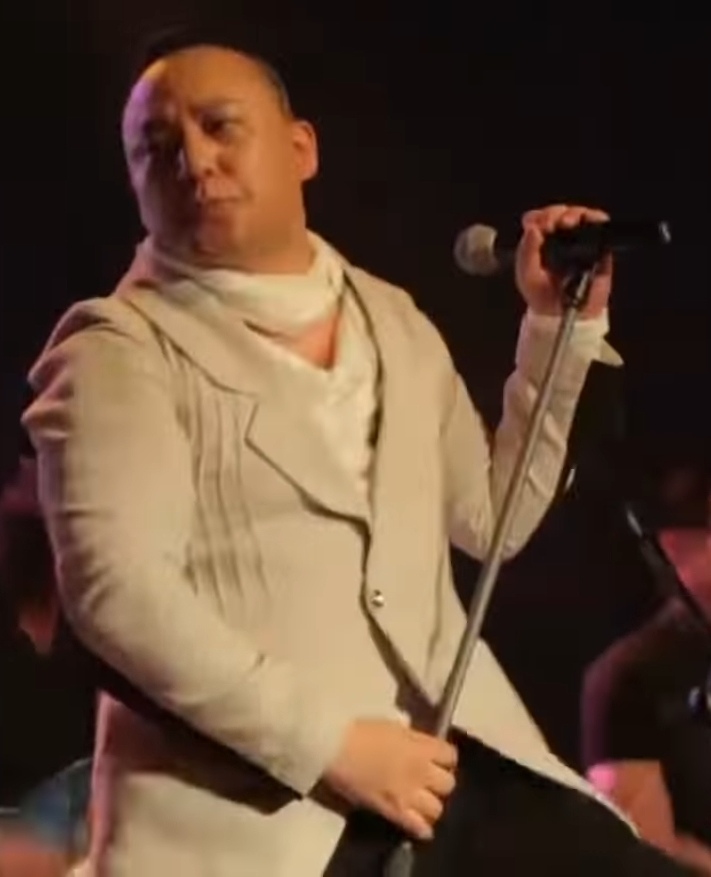
- Shin performing in 2014
- Born: May 6, 1968; Seoul, South Korea
- Died: October 27, 2014 (aged 46); Asan Medical Center, Seoul, South Korea
- Occupations: Singer-songwriter; record producer; radio DJ; author
- Years active: 1988–2014
- Spouse: Yoon Won-hee (m. 2002)
- Children: 2
- Musical career
- Also known as: Crom Wittgenstein
- Genres: Rock; pop; techno; jazz
- Instruments: Vocals; guitar; piano
- Label: Danal Entertainment
- Formerly of: N.EX.T Infinite Orbit

Korean name
- Hangul: 신해철
- Hanja: 申海澈
- RR: Sin Haecheol
- MR: Sin Haech'ŏl
- Website: shinhaechul.com (in Korean)

Shin Hae-chul (Korean: 신해철; May 6, 1968 – October 27, 2014) was a South Korean singer-songwriter and the frontman, vocalist of rock band N.EX.T. He was a record producer known for being a pioneer of Korean experimental rock music. He was referred to by fans as the "Demon Lord" or "The Devil" for his charismatic stage presence.

Shin and his band Muhangwedo debuted at the 1988 MBC Campus Music Festival, where the band won first place for the song "To You." He formed the experimental rock band N.EX.T in 1992. He was also known for hosting a radio show from 2001 to 2012.

Shin died as a result of medical malpractice after undergoing surgery in 2014.

== Early life ==
Shin Hae-chul was born on May 6, 1968. He enrolled in Sogang University in 1987, where he studied philosophy until he dropped out to focus on his music career.

== Career ==
=== Debut ===
Shin formed the band Muhangwedo (무한궤도) in 1988 when he was a sophomore at Sogang University. The band received national attention when it appeared on the televised 1988 MBC Campus Music Festival, a singing competition for amateurs. Muhangwedo won first place for the song "To You" (그대에게) which was written by Shin. The band released one album, 1989's When Our Lives Are Almost Over (우리 앞의 생이 끝나갈 때).

=== Early solo career ===
Shin released his first solo album in 1990, which included a song that had an English rap, which was unconventional in the Korean music scene at the time. The album was a huge hit, leading to Shin rising to the top of Korean pop music charts and receiving multiple Korean pop music awards. His second solo album, Myself, was released in 1991, which was first album in Korea to have used midi. He also started a gig as a radio DJ on MBC FM.

=== The N.EX.T years ===
In 1992, Shin formed the band N.EX.T — moving from pop music to rock. Their first album, Home, was a concept album. While his previous songs were mainly about love or heartache, here Shin started to write more about social issues, such as criticizing the fast lifestyle of urbanites in "City People". The group's second album was released in 1994 titled The Return of N.EX.T Part 1: The Being where Shin introduced more philosophical lyrics, such as questioning the meaning of life in the song "The Ocean: About Immortality". The band's third album, The Return of N.EX.T Part 2: World. Some of the band members changed over time, with Shin being the constant lead singer/songwriter.

During this time he also did a one-time collaboration with singer Yoon Sang to form Nodance, wrote the original sound track for the Korean movie Jungle Story, and was the DJ for the MBC FM radio program FM Music City from 1996 to 1997. In 1996, he created his own label, Big Bang Music.

In 1997 N.EX.T released a rock ballad single, "Here, I Stand for You" which sold 500,000 copies in South Korea. The band went on to release their fourth album Lazenca: A Space Rock Opera in November 1997, which was also the original sound track for the television animation series Lazenca. The band split up after this- Shin went on to study music producing in London.

=== Crom ===
In London, Shin re-named himself Crom (inspired by Cromwell) and released a techno album Crom's Techno Works in 1998. The following year, he formed a project group Monocrom with guitarist Chris Tsangarides and released the eponymous project album Monocrom. The music in the album was experimental, combining heavy metal with Korean folk music, rap, and lyrical rock ballads. Most of the songs in this album were in English, which he collaborated with lyricist D. Yvette Wohn. After the release of Monocrom, Shin went to New York where he worked on producing his live album and some Korean movie soundtracks. In 2000, he created a three-man band Wittgenstein to produce a home studio album of the same name. He also wrote the song "Zergs are Coming" for the StarCraft music album.

=== Return of N.EX.T ===
Shin returned to Korea in 2002 and worked on various projects, mainly writing songs for other artists or for movie soundtracks. In 2004, he re-formed the group N.EX.T although the members were different, and released a double album The Return of N.EX.T Part 3: 개한민국. He also started DJing for a late night radio show Ghost Nation that became extremely popular. In 2007, N.EX.T released a jazz album The Songs for the One inspired by his newborn daughter. In 2008, the band released the album 666 Trilogy. After a long break, the band's final album, Reboot Myself was released in 2014.

=== Producer ===
In 2004, Shin participated in a special project with the best musicians of Korea, an album named "Tribute to Park Nohae's Collection of poems The Dawn of Labor 20th anniversary". It is the first attempted project in the history of Korean music with recordings dedicated to poetry. Shin sang "Heaven" (하늘) with Psy on this album.

=== Radio DJ ===
Throughout his career Shin hosted several radio programs, including Music City with Shin Hae Chul and GhostStation with Shin Hae Chul After supporting and campaigning for the president Roh Moo-hyun in 2002 election, Mr. Shin hosts the popular Ghost Nation on MBC, a late-night radio program since 2003. His fans call him "Mawang" (마왕 'the Demon Lord').

On September 16, 2007, Shin ended Ghost Nation, but he also announced that the show would be broadcast on the internet and no longer through MBC.

== Personal life ==
He married Yoon Won-hee (윤원희) on September 29, 2002, just before the 2002 election. He released his first jazz album The Songs for the One in 2007, dedicated to his wife and daughter.

Shin was found to be suffering from prosopagnosia, on a TV show (MBC Goldfish) in which he made a guest appearance. After that, he hosted a brand-new TV comedy debate program 100-second Debate (since May 2007), with a similar format of the MBC's 100 Minute Debate. On July 29, 2007, he appeared as a victim (guest) of Lee Kyung-kyu's Hidden Camera.

=== Death ===
Shin was treated for gastrointestinal problems by Dr. Kang Se-hoon at Sky Hospital on October 17, 2014. Kang carried out stomach reduction surgery without consent from Shin. During surgery, Kang punctured Shin's upper small intestine and pericardium, which later resulted in peritonitis. After developing a fever, which he was told was normal after surgery, Shin suffered a heart attack on October 22, and died on October 27 from peritonitis, pericarditis, sepsis, and brain damage due to lack of oxygen. At the urging of friends, Shin's family stopped his cremation at short notice and requested an autopsy. In March 2015, Songpa police found that Shin Hae-chul died from medical malpractice. Kang was struck off the medical register, fined and sentenced to one year in jail. The death of Shin through malpractice led to a revision of the law in South Korea to allow a state-run agency to help in malpractice cases. The law is referred to as the "Shin Hae-chul Law."

Shin's remains were cremated on Seoul Memorial Park in Wonji-dong on November 4th and placed in a columbarium at Utopia Memorial Park in Anseong the following day. In October 2015, they moved the remains to a pyramidal grave inspired by one of his daughter's drawings.

=== Tributes ===
Psy's song "Dream" was released in 2015 as a tribute to Shin, donating the profits to his bereaved family. The lyrics recount conversations Psy had with Shin while he was still alive.

On the fourteenth episode of Hangout with Yoo, Yoo Jae-suk played drums, as part of the show format, to accompany the unreleased song "Father and I: Part 3". The song used the pre-recorded vocal narrated monologue of Shin Hae-chul, and was supported by his friend and colleague, Lee Seung-hwan, and fan, Ha Hyun-woo. The new version was called "Stargazer" by Lee Seung-hwan. It was played to and lauded by some of the biggest names in the Korean music industry, all of whom took a moment to praise the genius nature of Shin.

== Discography ==
=== Muhangwedo ===
==== Studio albums ====
Title	Album details	Peak chart positions	Sales
Title	Album details	KOR	Sales
우리 앞의 생이 끝나갈 때 (When Our Lives Are Almost Over)*	Released: 1989; Label: Danal Entertainment	—N/a	—N/a
* denotes unofficial English translation.

=== As a solo artist ===
==== Studio albums ====
Title	Album details	Peak chart positions	Sales
Title	Album details	KOR	Sales
슬픈표정하지 말아요 (Don't Put on a Sad Face)*	Released: May 1, 1990; Label: HKR, Danal Entertainment	—N/a	
Myself	Released: March 20, 1991; Label: Daeyoung AV Co., Danal Entertainment	—N/a	
Crom's Techno Works	Released: June 1, 1998; Label: DMR, Bugs	—N/a	KOR: 150,000
Monocrom	Released: May 1, 1999; Label: Doremi, Bugs	—N/a	
The Songs for the One	Released: January 29, 2007; Label: CJ E&M Music	—N/a	
* denotes unofficial English translation.

==== Extended plays ====
Title	Album details	Peak chart positions	Sales
Title	Album details	KOR	Sales
Reboot Myself Part 1	Released: June 26, 2014; Label: Daeyeong A/V, Danal Entertainment	13	KOR: 1,033+

== Filmography ==
=== Television ===
- Hello Franceska (MBC, 2005)

=== Film ===
- Whatcha Wearin'? (2012)
- On a Windy Day We Must Go to Apgujeong (1993)

== Bibliography ==
- Shin Hae-chul (1991). 사랑의 날개는 너에게. Prunsoop.
- Shin Hae-chul; Ji Seung-ho (2008). 쾌변독설. Buen Libro. ISBN 8995968230
- Shin Hae-chul (2014). 마왕 신해철 (Mawang Shin Hae-chul). Munhakdongne Publishing Corp. ISBN 8954634761
