= Central business district =

Commercial and business area of a city

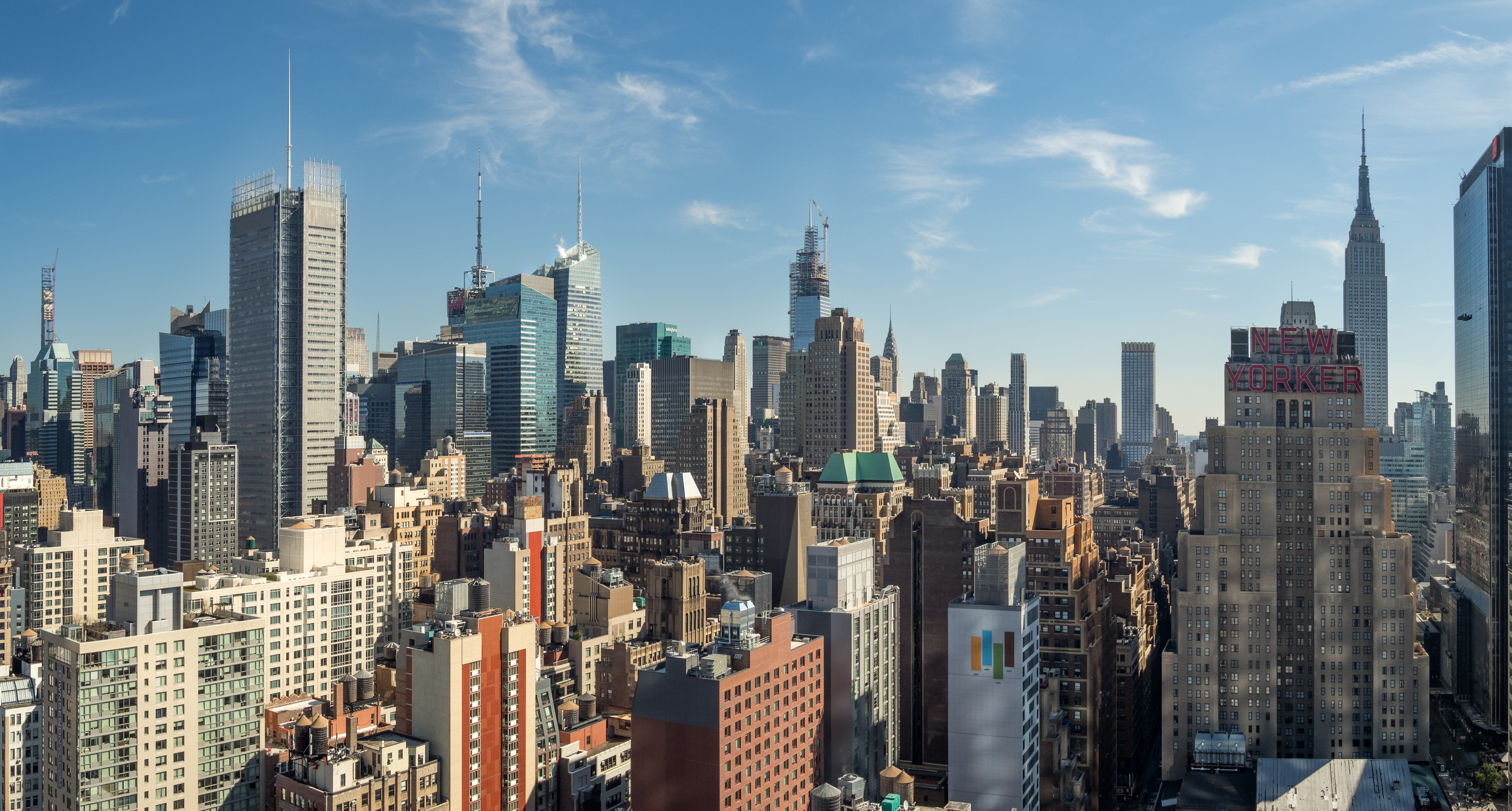
Midtown Manhattan is the central business district of New York City and the largest central business district in the world.

A central business district (CBD) is the commercial and business center of a city. It contains commercial space and offices, and in larger cities will often be described as a financial district. Geographically, it often coincides with the "city center" or "downtown". However, these concepts are not necessarily synonymous: many cities have a central business district located away from its traditional city center. The CBD will often be highly accessible and have a large variety and concentration of specialized goods and services compared to other parts of the city.

In Chicago, the Chicago Loop is the second-largest central business district in the United States. It is also referred to as the core of the city's downtown.

Mexico City also has its own historic city center, the colonial era "Centro Histórico", along with two CBDs: the mid-late 20th century Paseo de la Reforma in Polanco, and the new Santa Fe, respectively. Russia's largest central business district is the Moscow International Business Center in Moscow.

The shape and type of a central business district almost always closely reflect the city's history. Cities with strong preservation laws and maximum building height restrictions, such as Vancouver, Canada and Honolulu, Hawaii, to retain the character of the historic and cultural core may have a CBD quite a distance from the city center (and in some cases, outside the city limits itself). This distinction is quite common in European cities such as: London, Paris, Moscow, Vienna, Prague, and Budapest. The New World grew quickly after the emergence of modern transport, therefore a single centre often included many of the region's tallest buildings and served as both a commercial and cultural city center.

In the 21st century, increasing urbanization has led to the development of megacities that often have multiple CBDs scattered across the urban area. Downtown sections of cities, especially in North America, often are distinct from CBDs and city centers. No two CBDs have the same spatial shape, but there are certain common geometric patterns, which are largely a result of centralized commercial and industrial activities.

== Australia ==
In Australia, the term CBD is widely used officially and colloquially, in the sense of city center. The country's three largest cities, Sydney, Melbourne, and Brisbane have large CBDs. Sydney features growing micro-central business districts, which serve as the hub for their respective areas outside the CBD. An example is Parramatta (considered the financial hub of Western Sydney), Chatswood, and North Sydney. Also on the outskirts of Brisbane, within Brisbane-Gold Coast urban area with a population of three million, a new micro Gold Coast central business district being created in Southport.

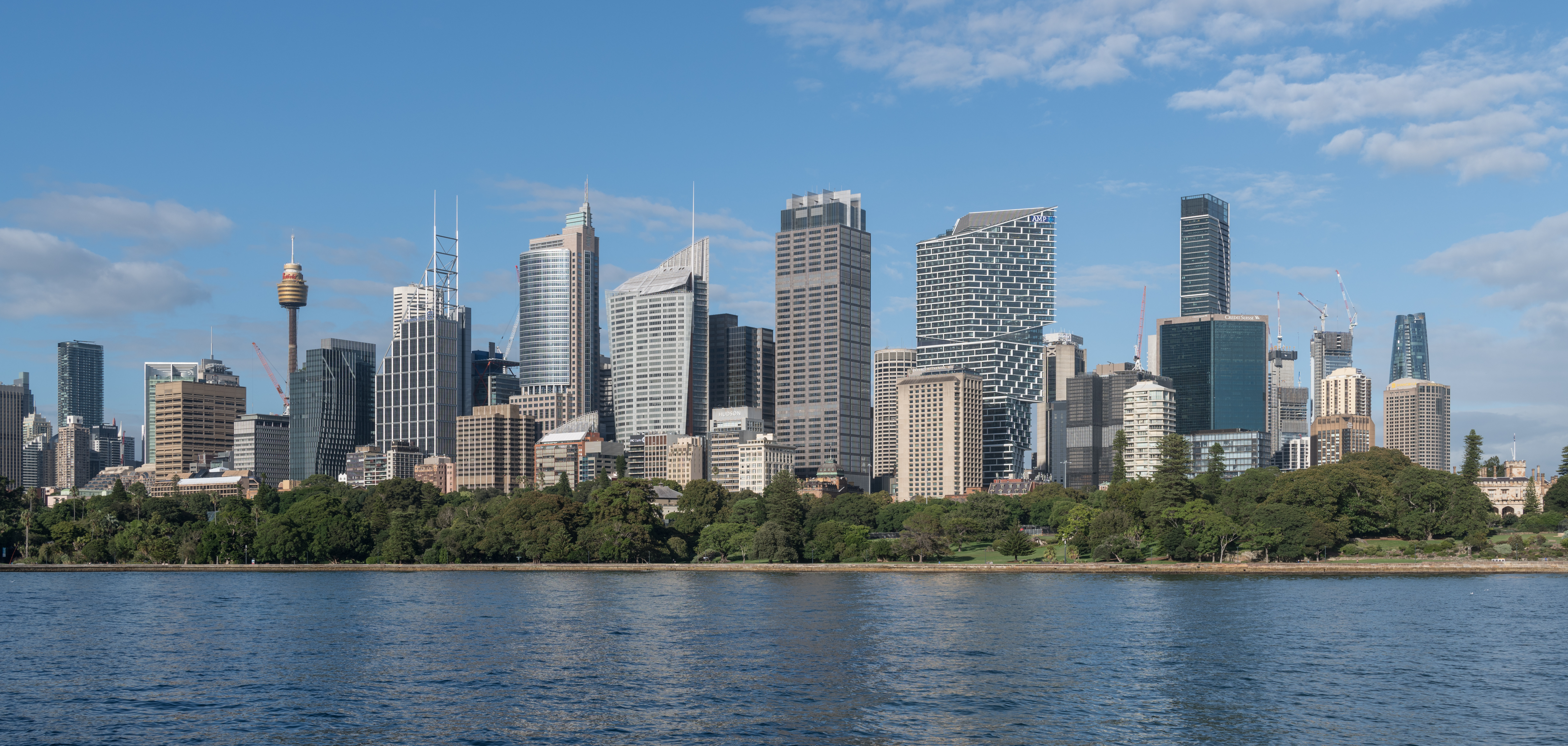
Sydney central business district

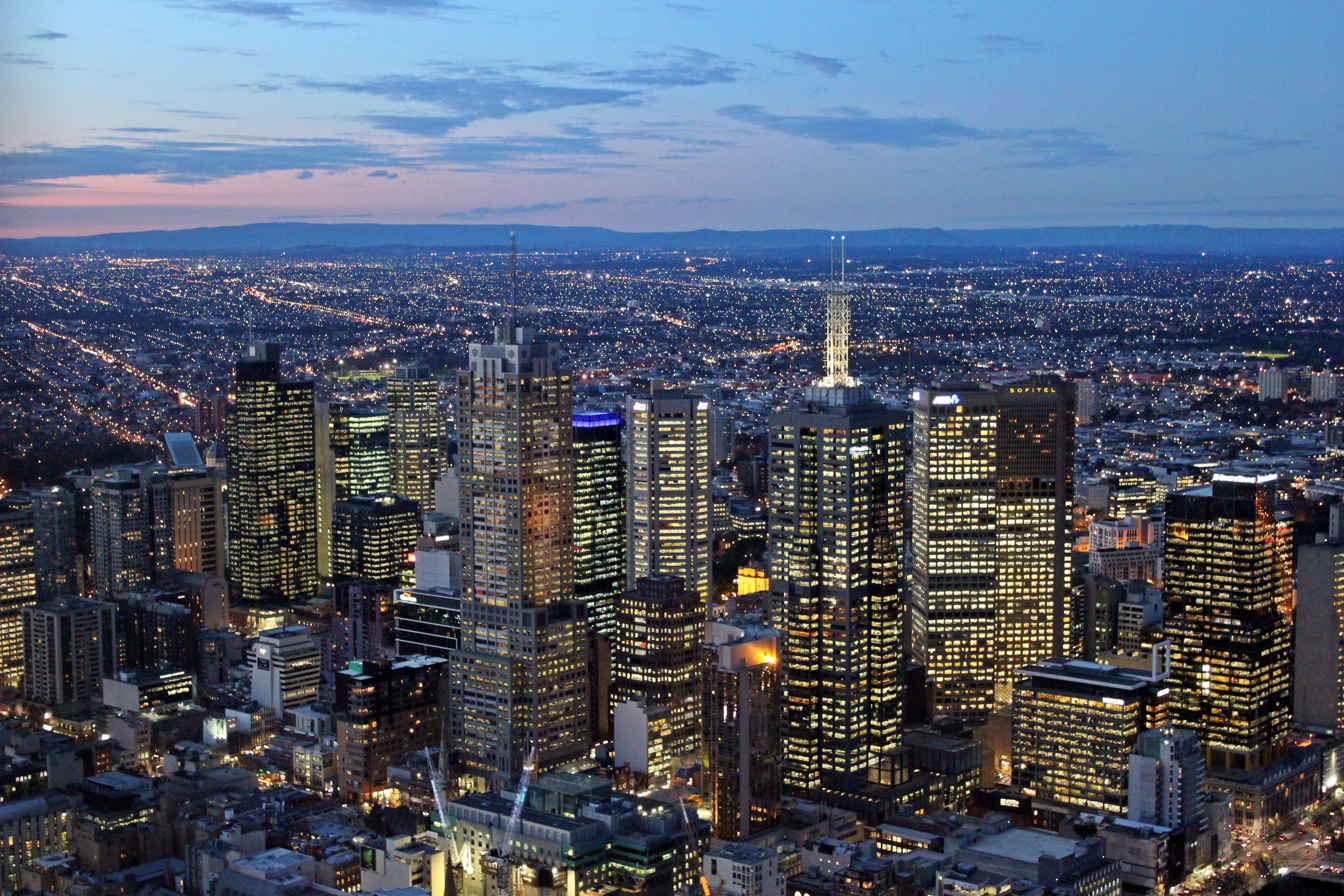
Melbourne central business district

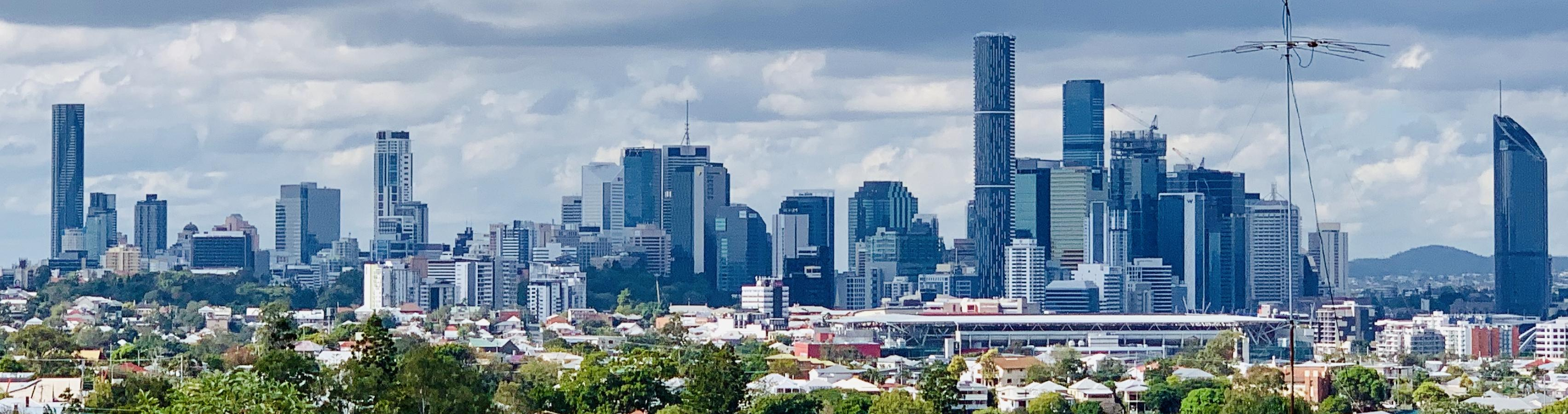
Brisbane central business district

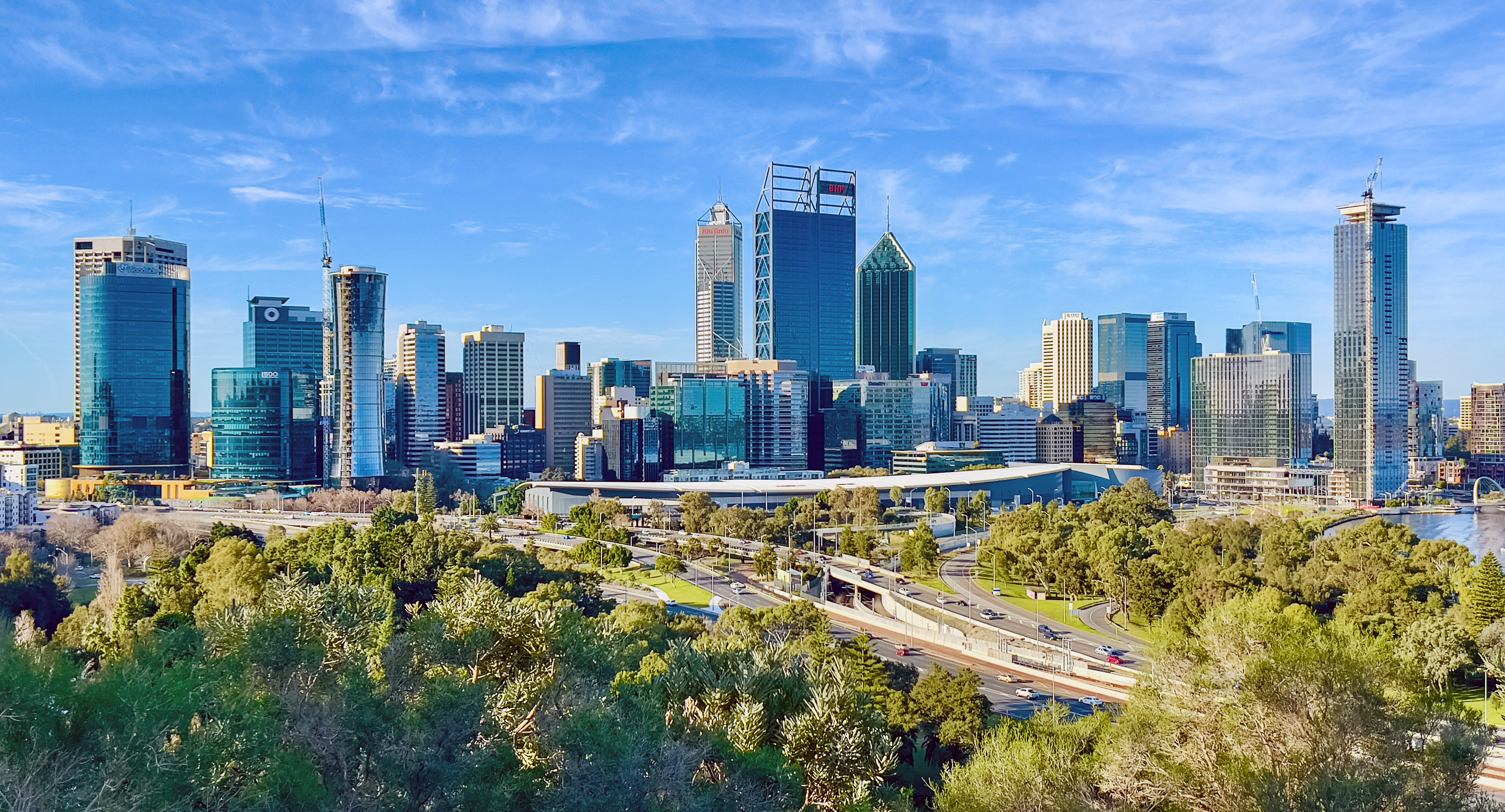
Perth central business district

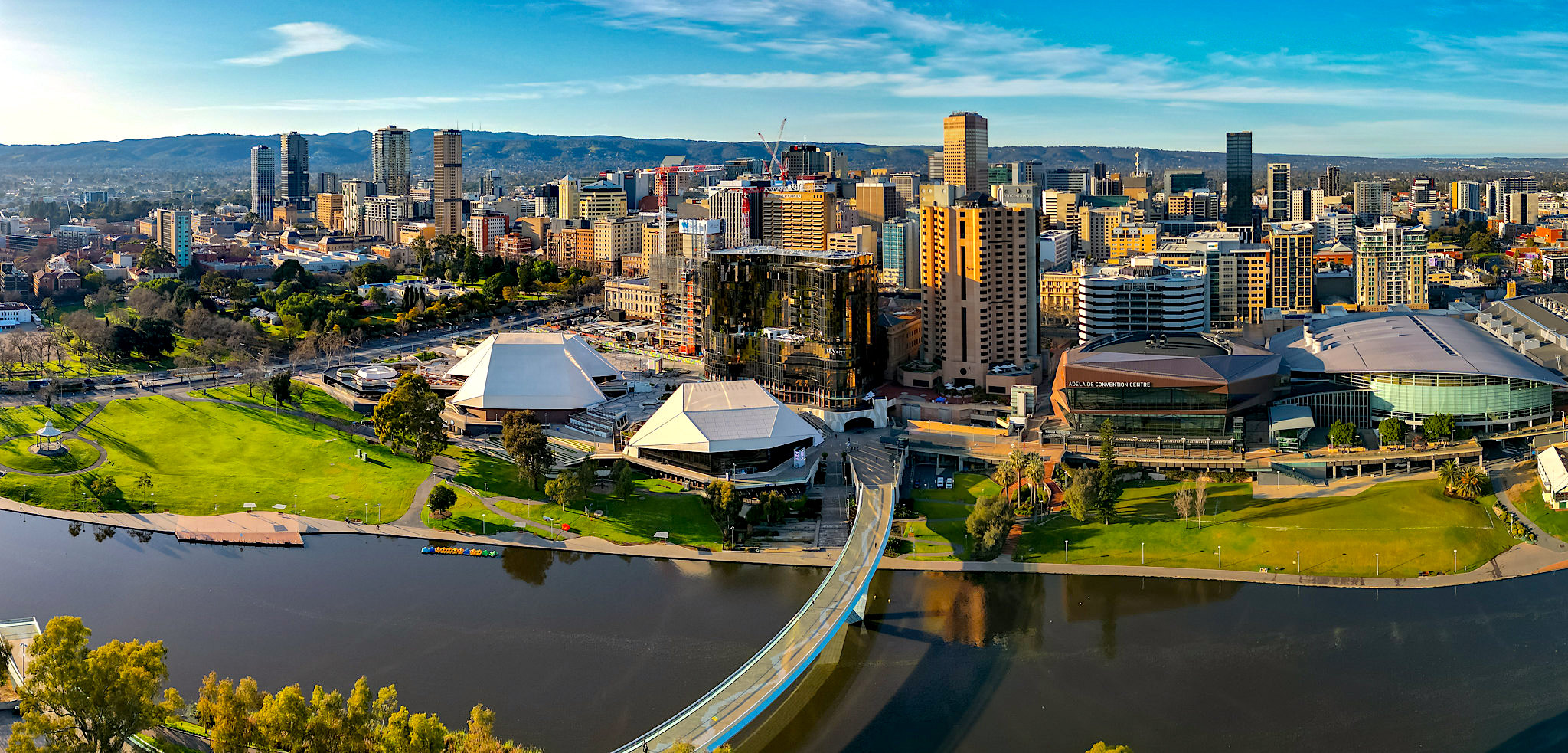
Adelaide central business district

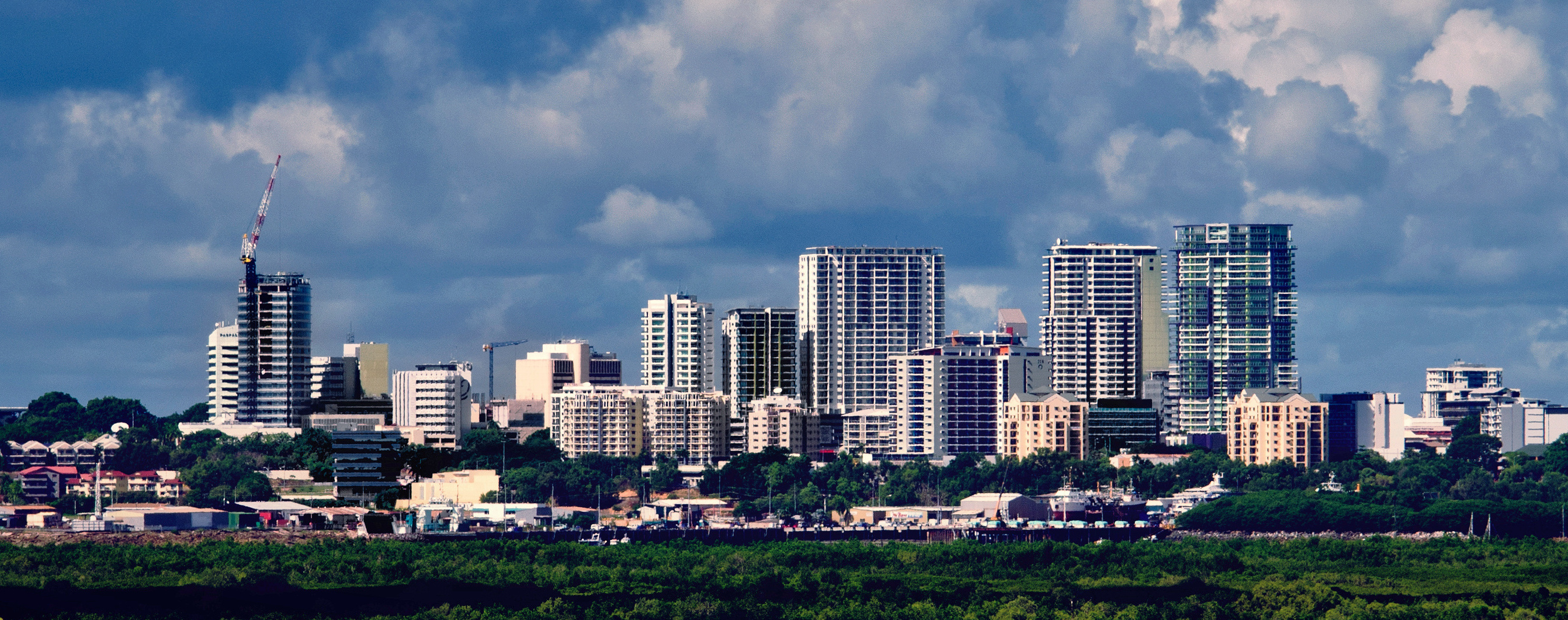
Darwin central business district

== Brazil ==
São Paulo is a multipolar city, with several business districts. Avenida Faria Lima and the neighboring districts, Itaim Bibi and Vila Olímpia, now concentrate a large part of the financial activities in São Paulo and Brazil. Avenida Paulista and nearby streets is a well-established financial center that has several banking offices and corporate headquarters, as well as hospitals. Its Historic Center was the city's first business center; There, the São Paulo Stock Exchange is located. The region comprising Avenidas Berrini, Doutor Chucri Zaidan, and Nações Unidas, the city's newest commercial district, has offices of multinational companies and also commercial services.

In Rio de Janeiro, Brazil's second-largest city, the main business district still is in downtown, where Petrobrás and Vale headquarters are located, but there is a concentration of business in Botafogo harbor and in Barra da Tijuca, a newer Rio de Janeiro suburb located in city's west region.

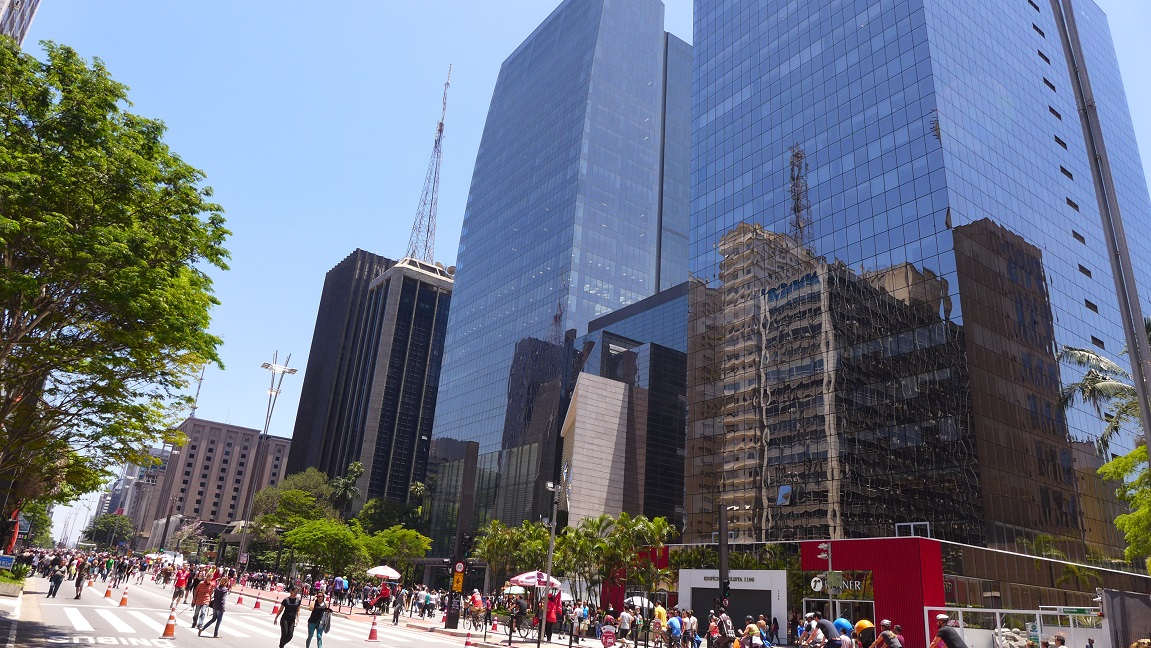
Avenida Paulista, São Paulo

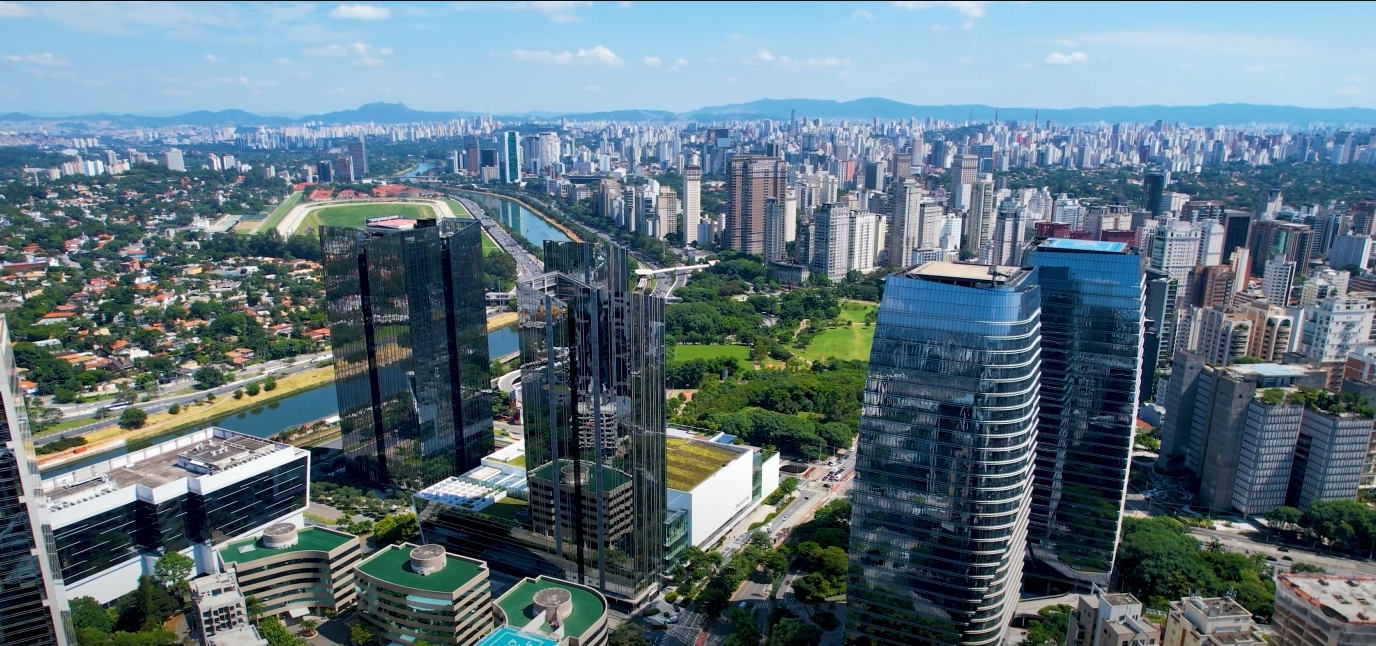
Itaim Bibi, with a view of Marginal Pinheiros, São Paulo

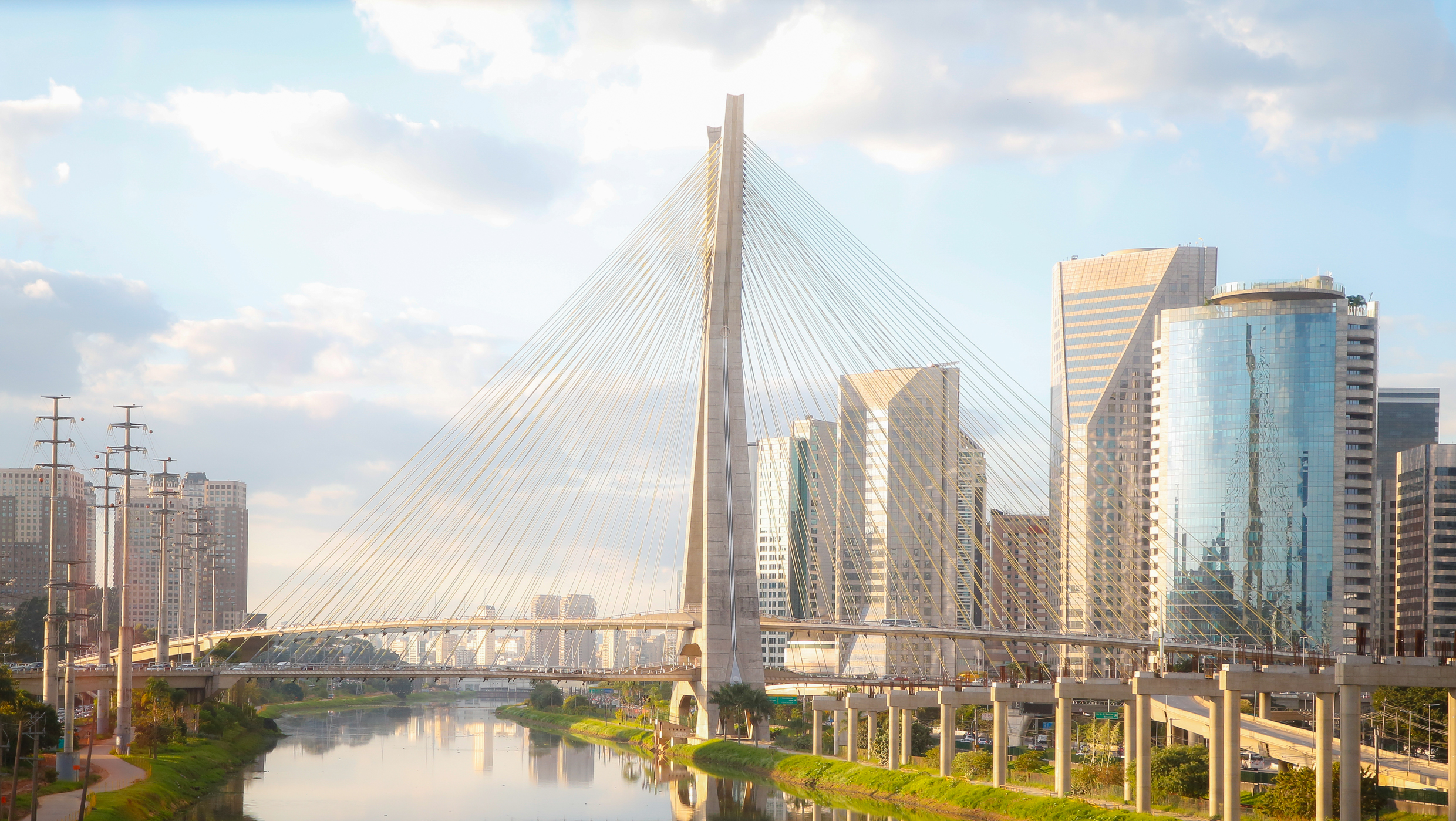
CENU in Brooklin Novo, São Paulo

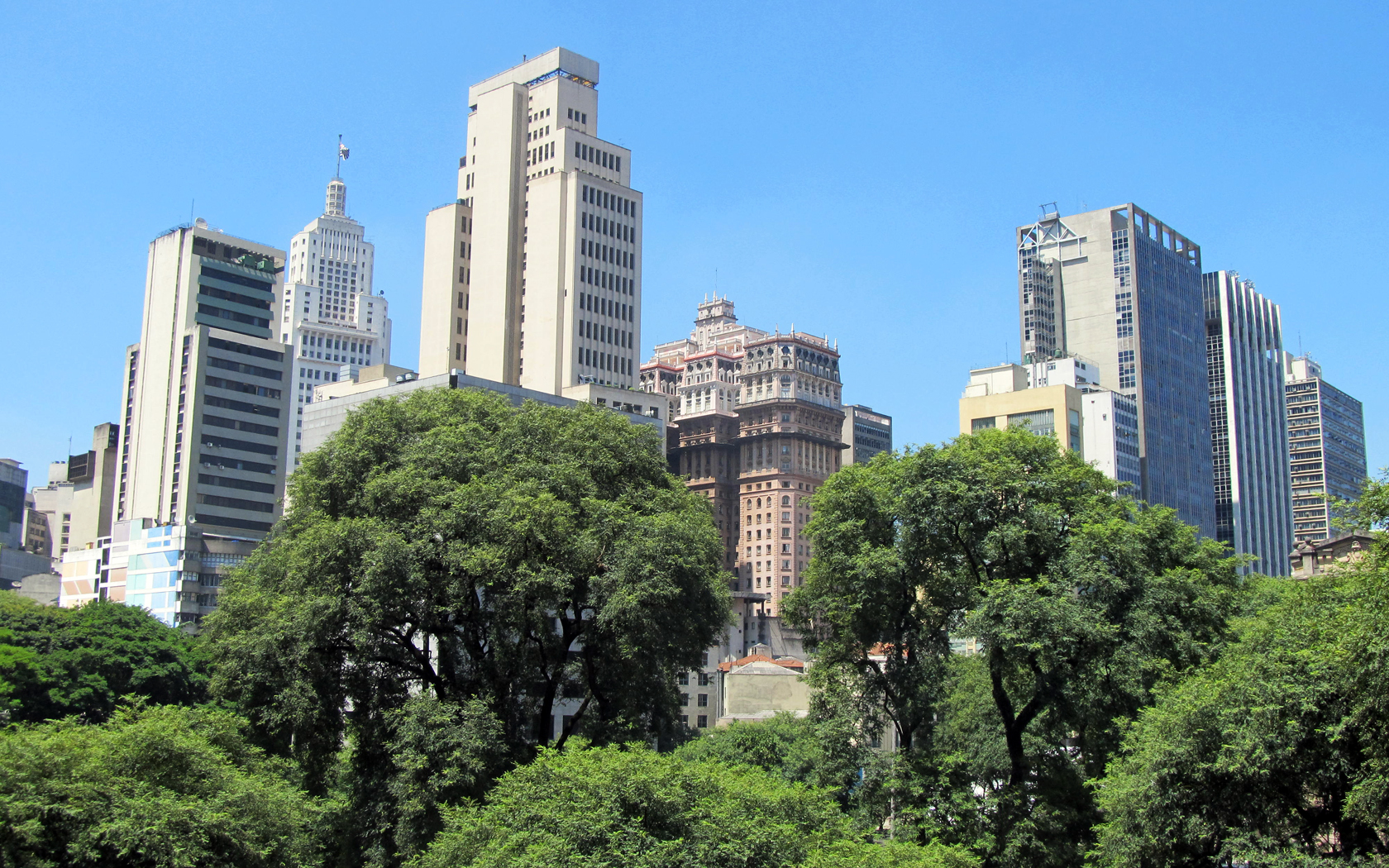
Historic Center of São Paulo, where the São Paulo Stock Exchange is located

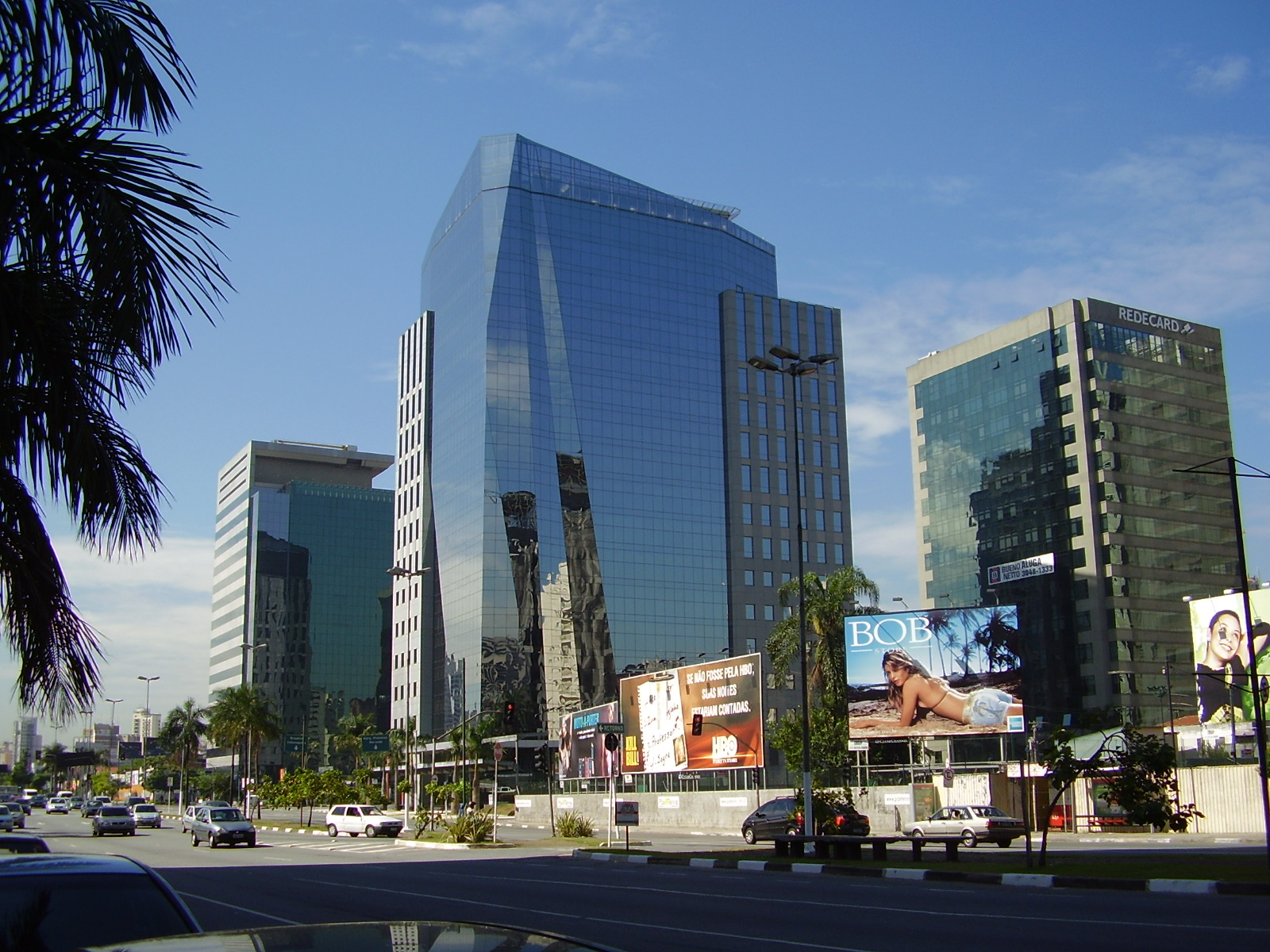
Avenida Faria Lima in Vila Olímpia, São Paulo

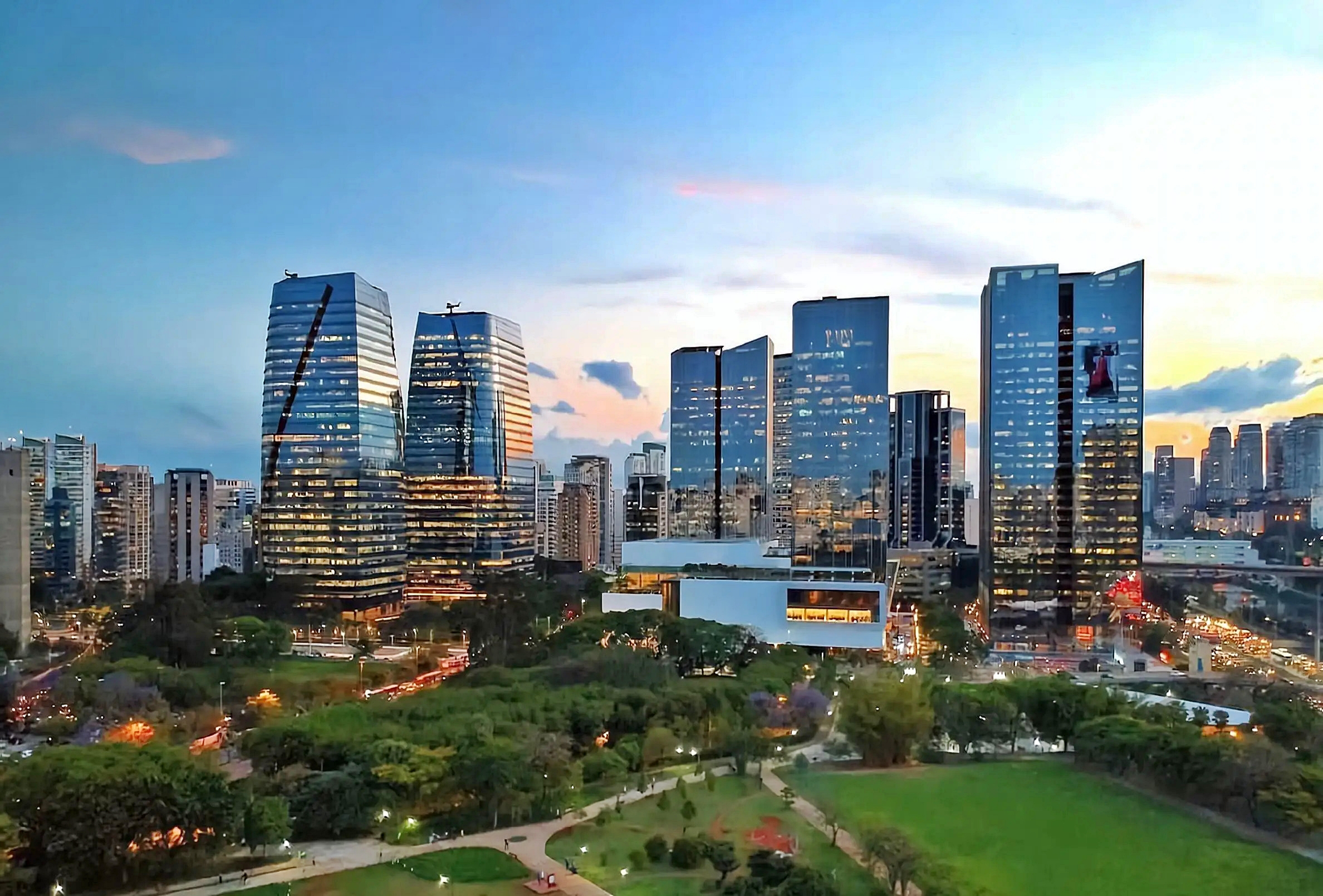
Itaim Bibi, in Pinheiros, São Paulo

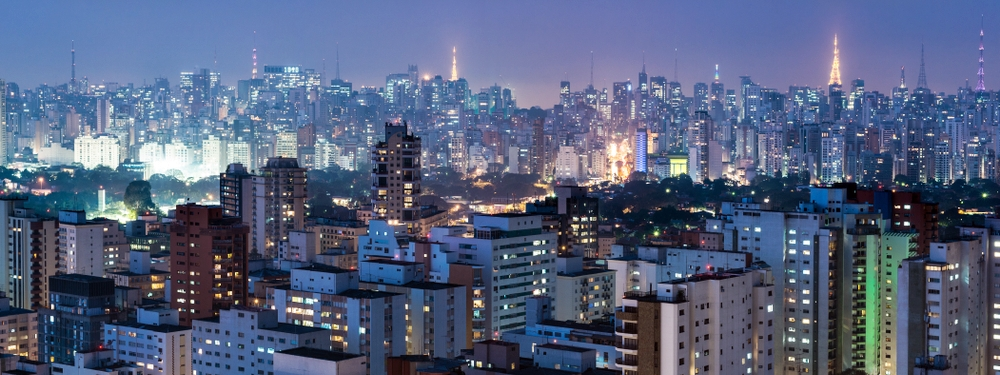
Jardins, São Paulo

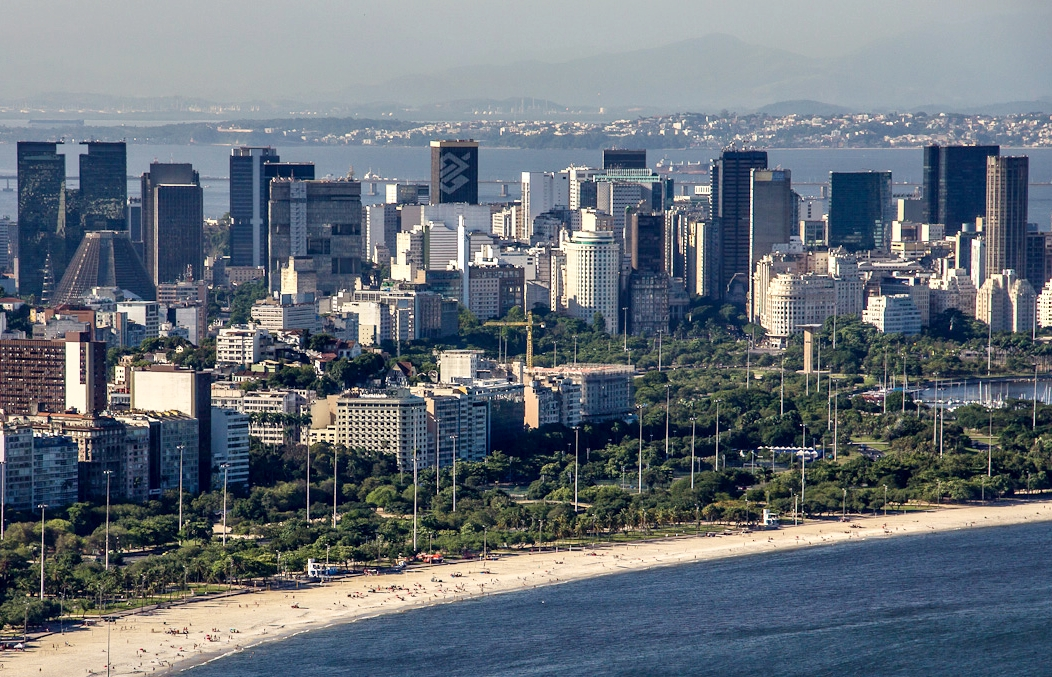
Downtown, Rio de Janeiro

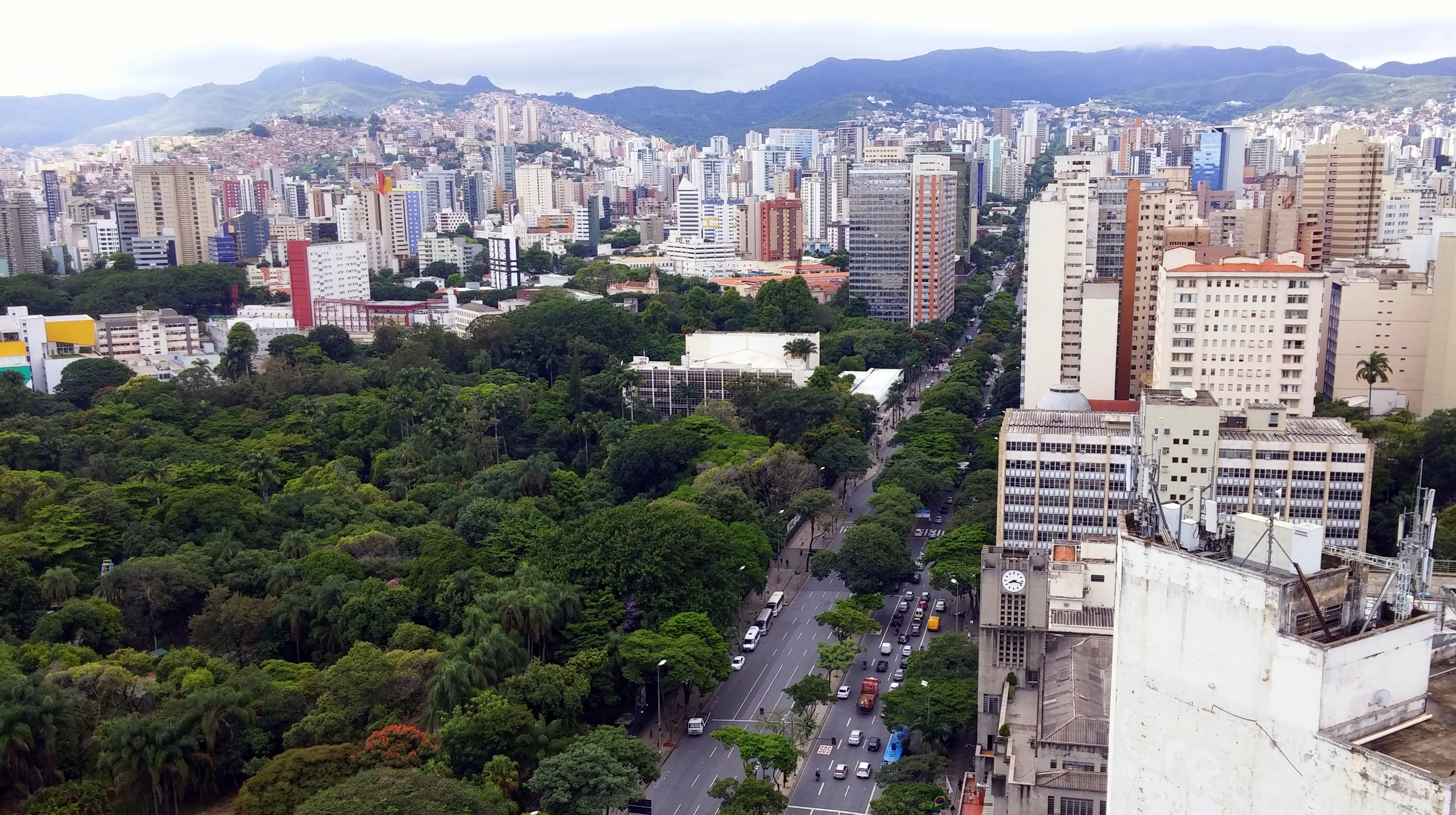
Centro, Belo Horizonte

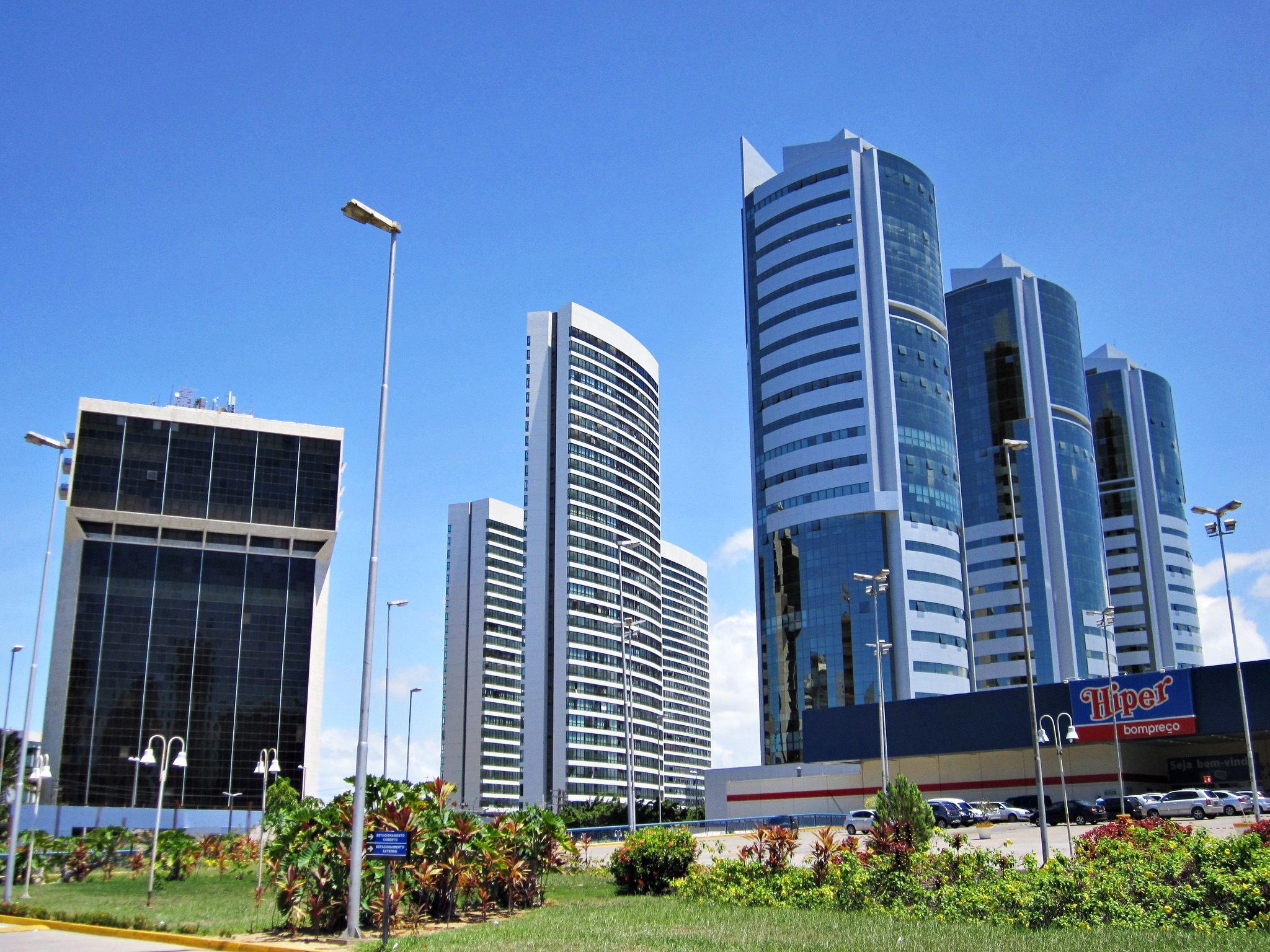
Boa Viagem, Recife

== Canada ==
Toronto has a number of central business districts scattered throughout the city, populated with young, highly educated, white-collar professionals. These CBDs often contain major banks, corporate headquarters, financial institutions, and tech companies. Since the 2010s, high-rise condominiums have become increasingly prevalent as well.

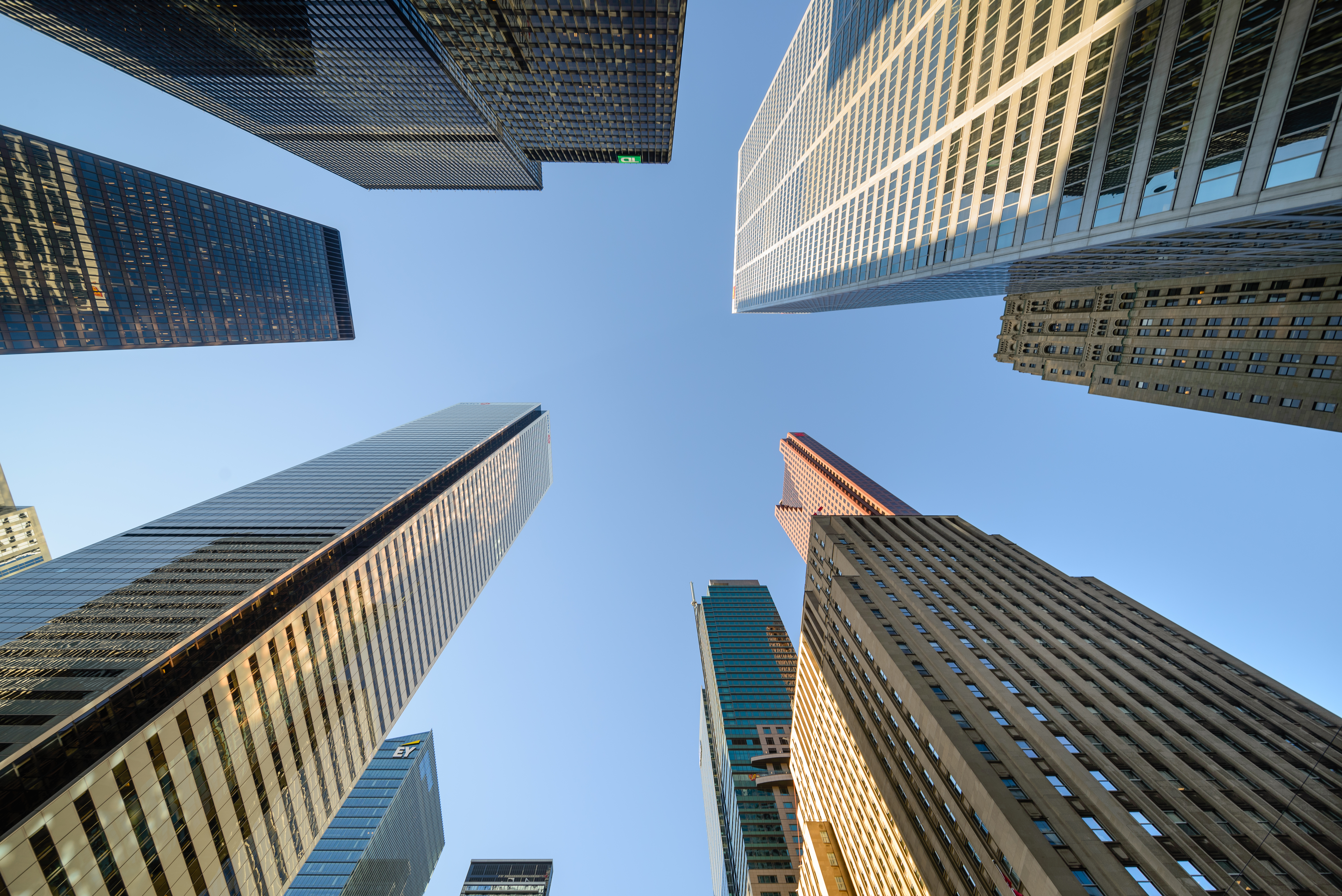
Financial District, Toronto

Yonge–Eglinton

== China ==
- Beijing central business district, Beijing
- Lujiazui, Shanghai
- Zhujiang New Town, Guangzhou, Guangdong
- Futian District, Shenzhen, Guangdong
- Jiefangbei, Chongqing
- Xiaobailou, Tianjin
- Hexi New Town, Nanjing, Jiangsu
- Xinjiekou, Nanjing, Jiangsu
- Jinji Lake, Suzhou, Jiangsu
- Wangjiadun, Wuhan, Hubei
- Qianjiang New City, Hangzhou, Zhejiang
- Ningbo South, Ningbo, Zhejiang
- May Fourth Square, Qingdao, Shandong
- Furong, Changsha, Hunan
- Zhengdong New Area, Zhengzhou, Henan
- Qiandeng Lake, Foshan, Guangdong
- Minjiang North, Fuzhou, Fujian
- Lixia District, Jinan, Shandong
- Tian'e Lake, Hefei, Anhui
- ASEAN Business District, Nanning, Guangxi
- Hengqin, Zhuhai, Guangdong
- Tianshan District, Ürümqi, Xinjiang
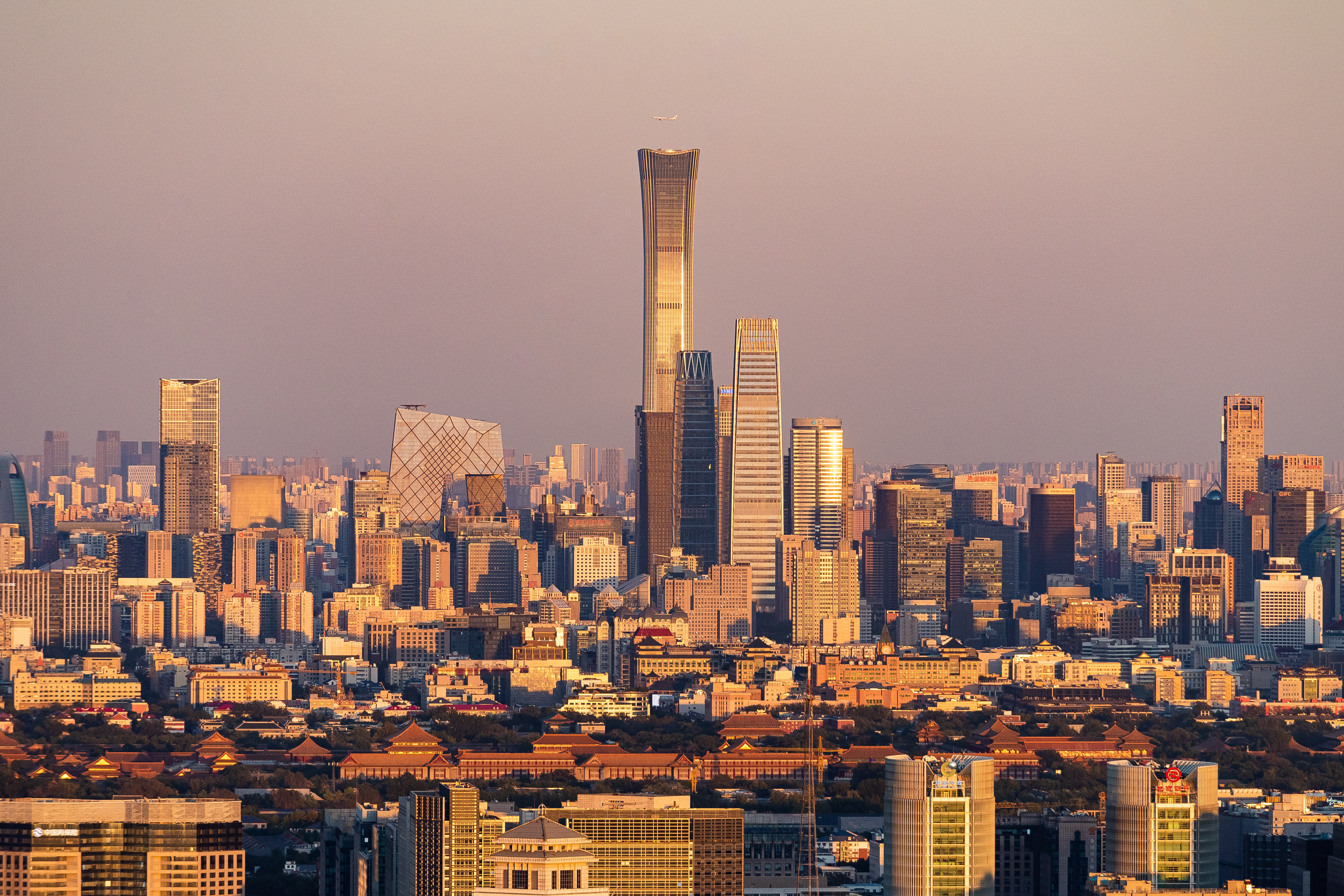
Central business district, Beijing

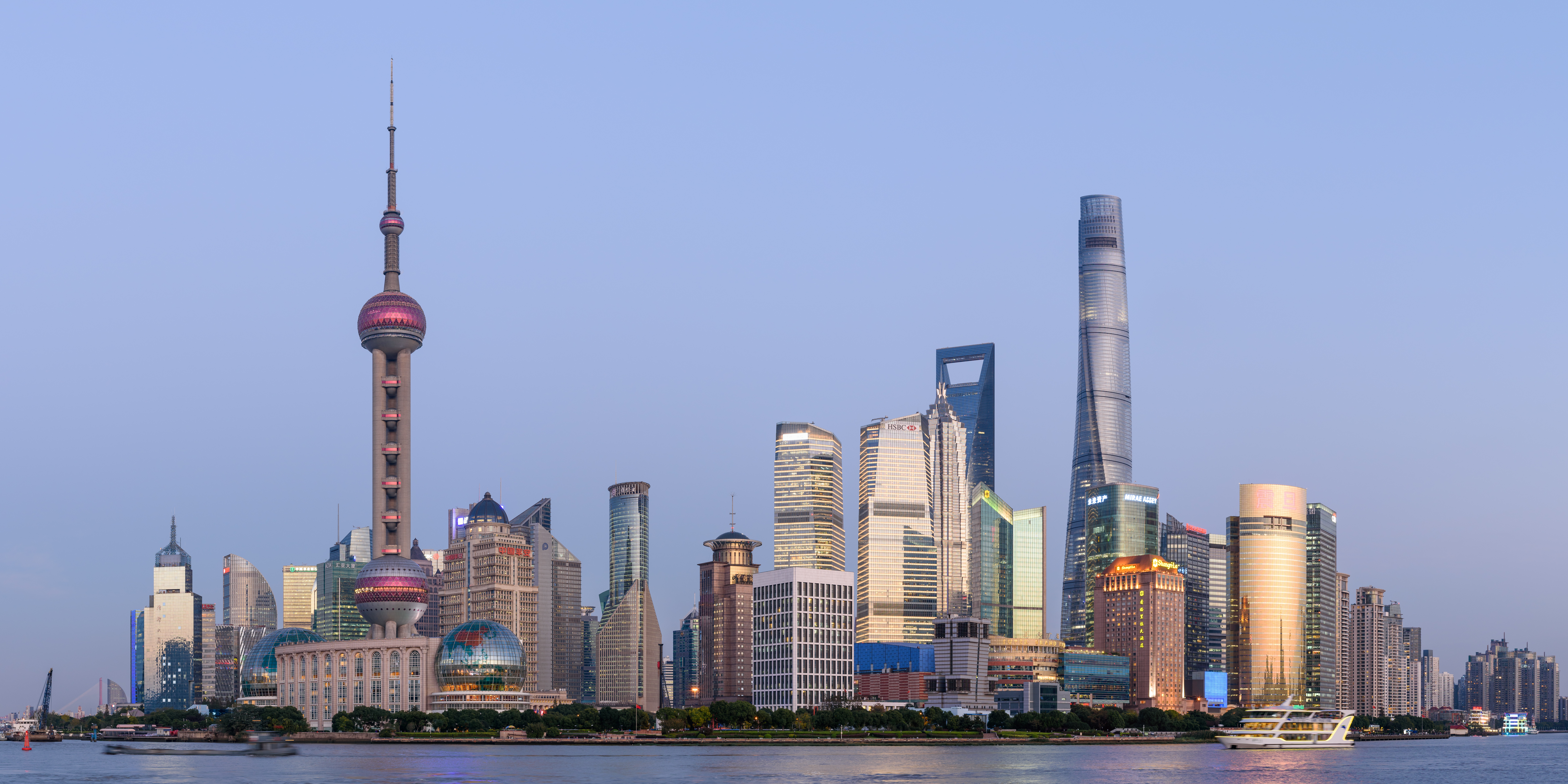
Lujiazui, Shanghai

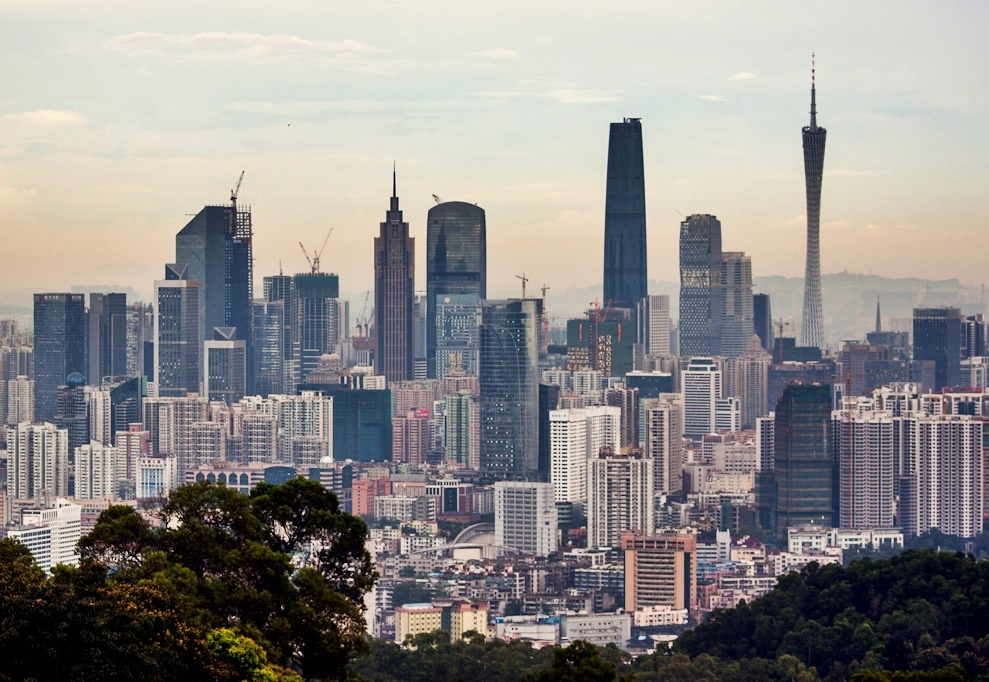
Zhujiang New Town, Guangzhou

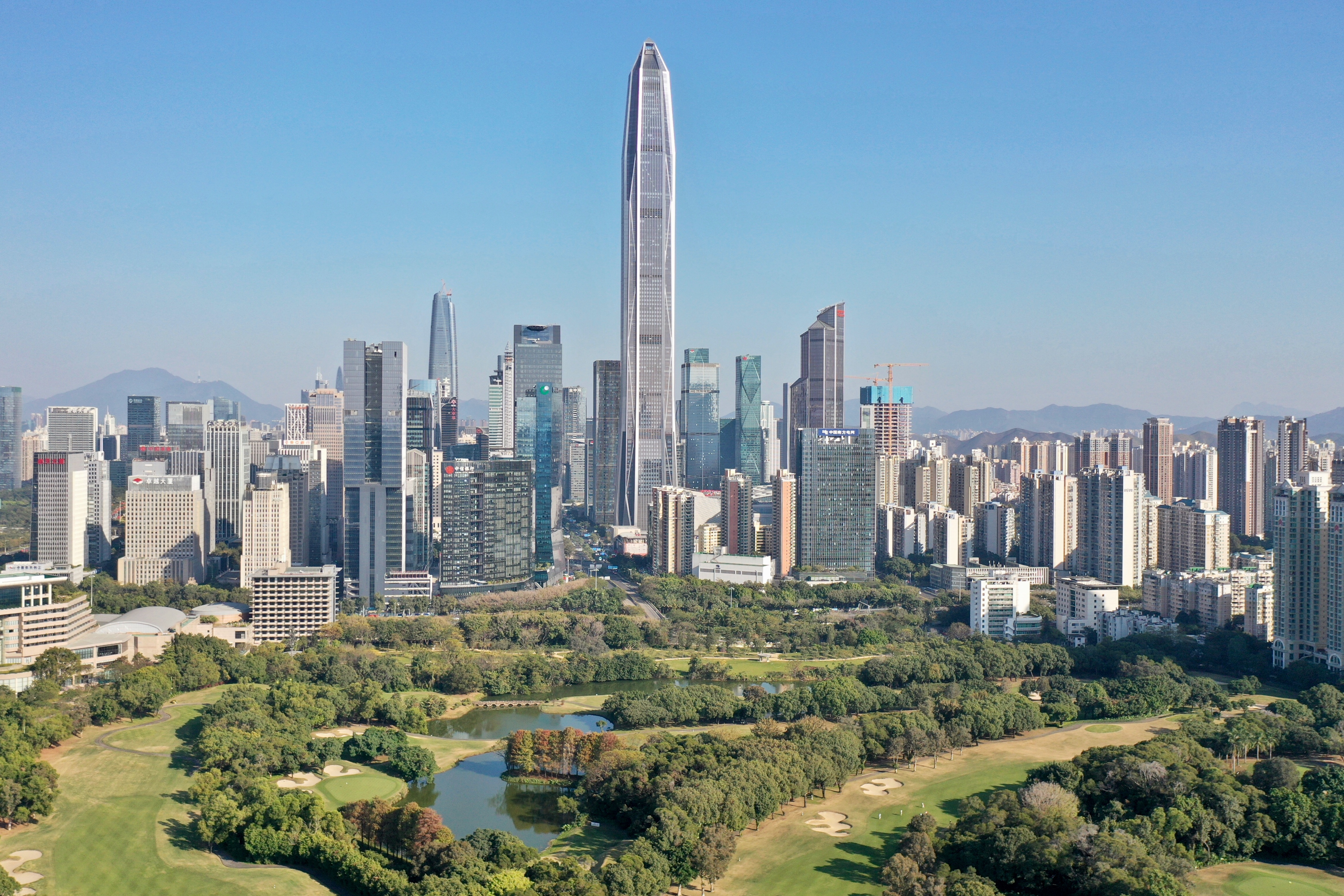
Futian District, Shenzhen

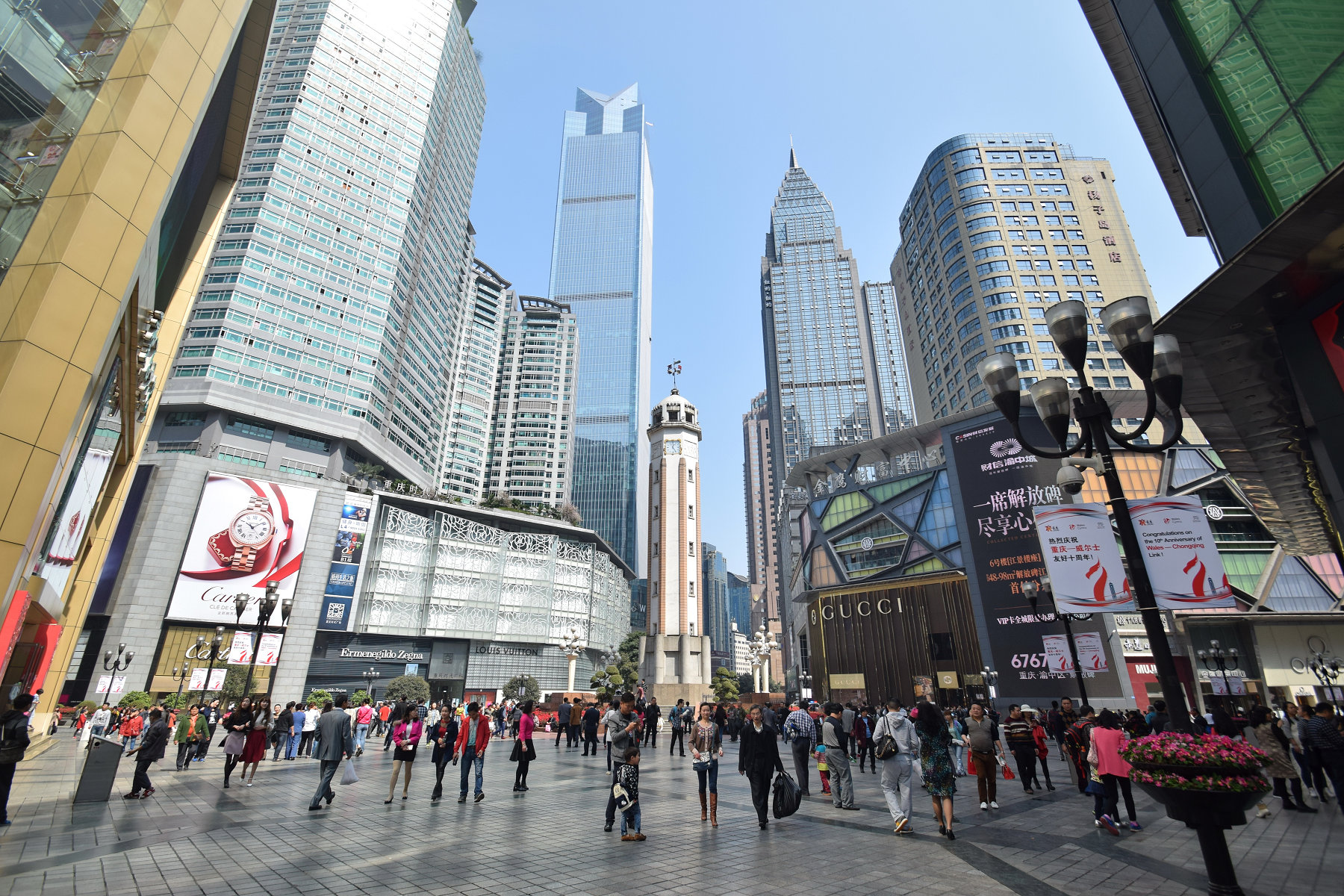
Jiefangbei, Chongqing

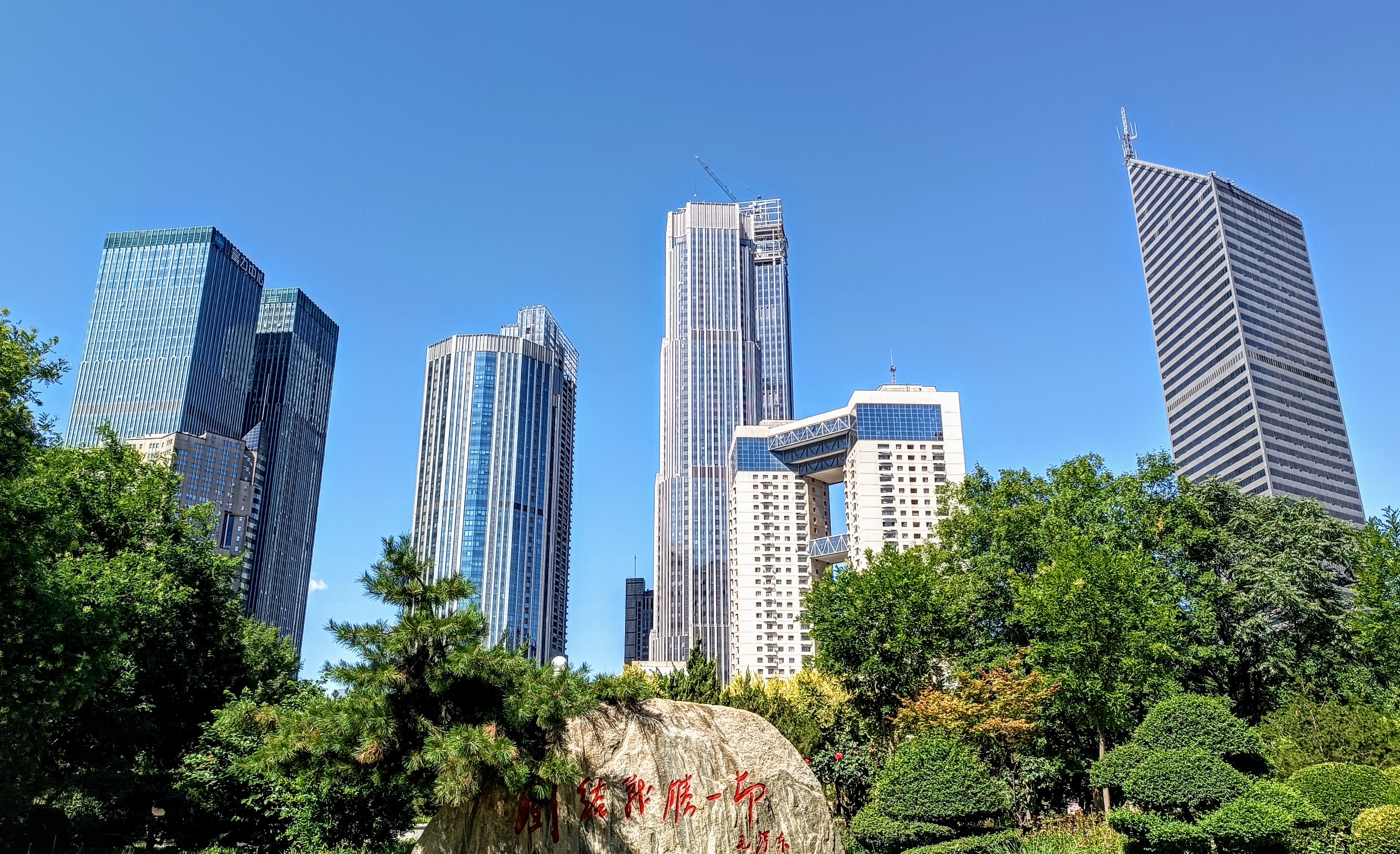
Xiaobailou, Tianjin

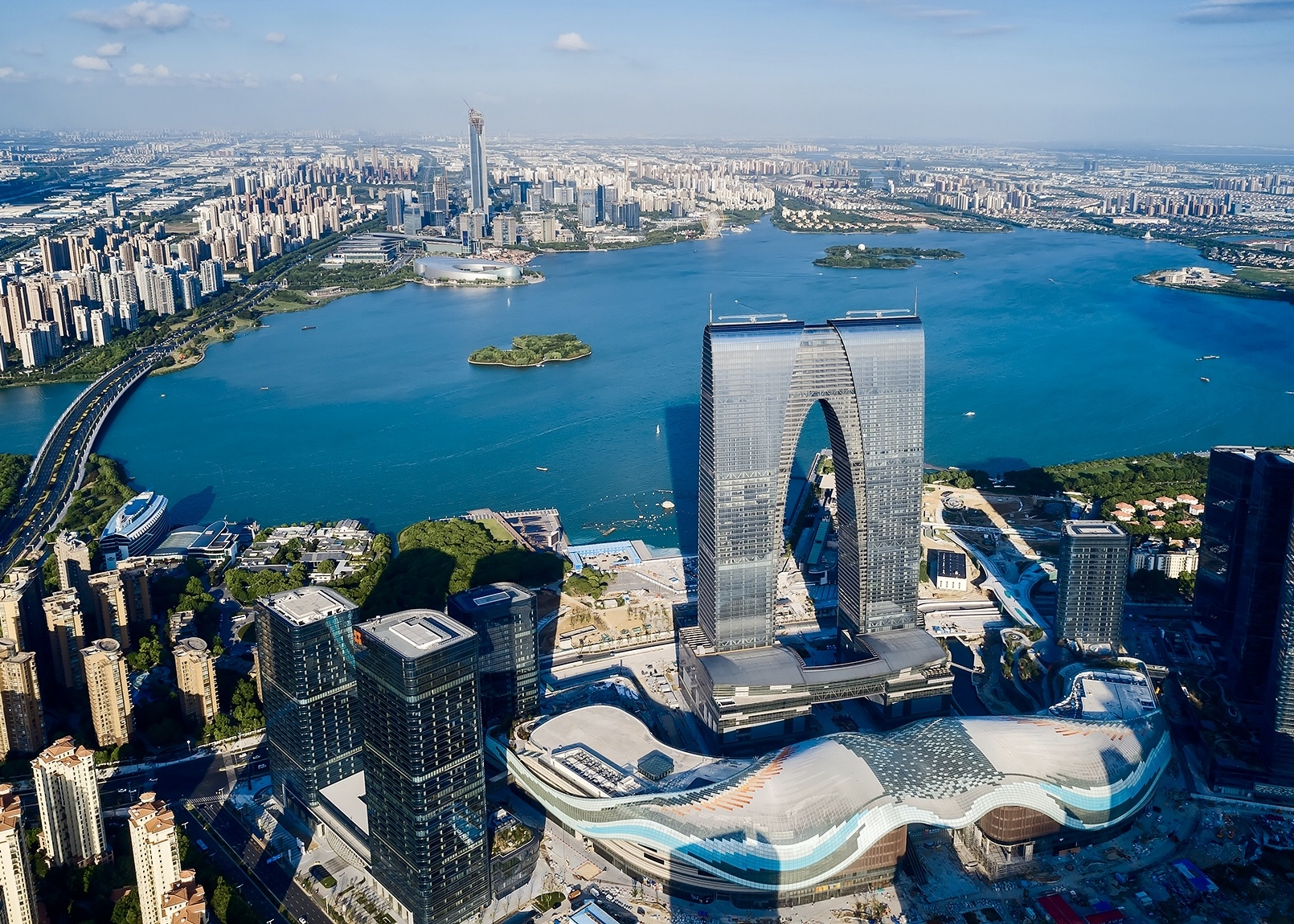
Jinji Lake, Suzhou

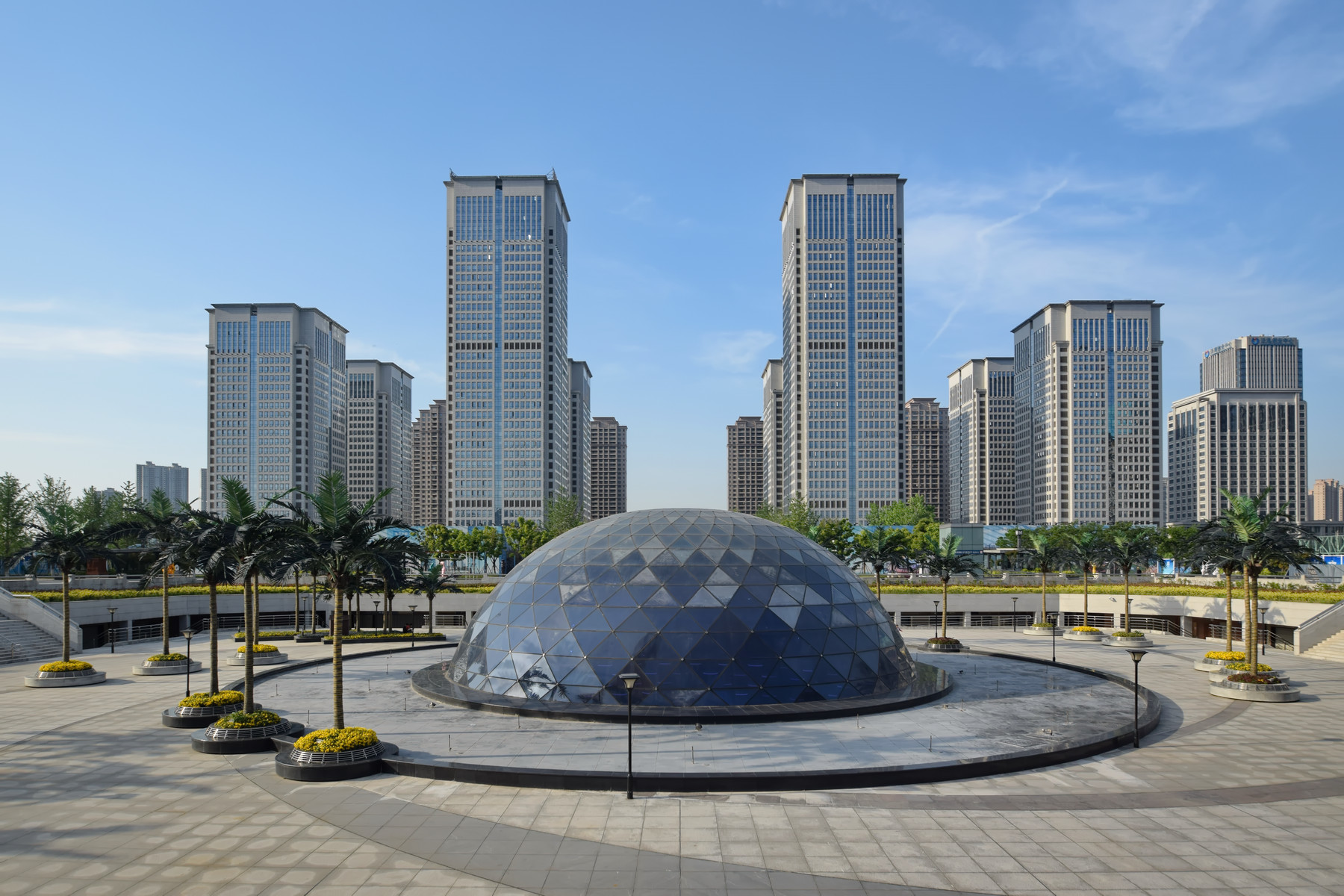
Wangjiadun, Wuhan

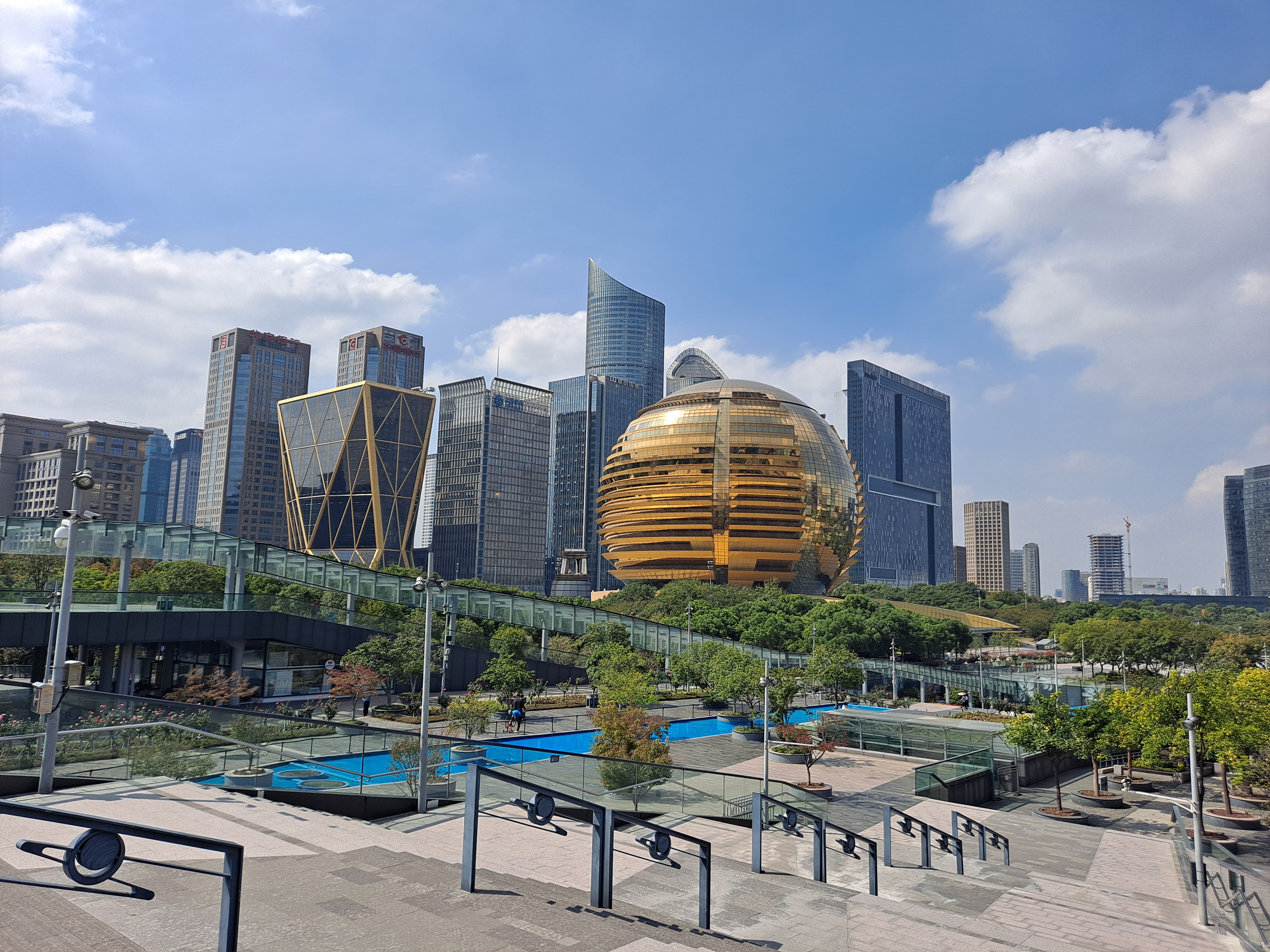
Qianjiang New City, Hangzhou

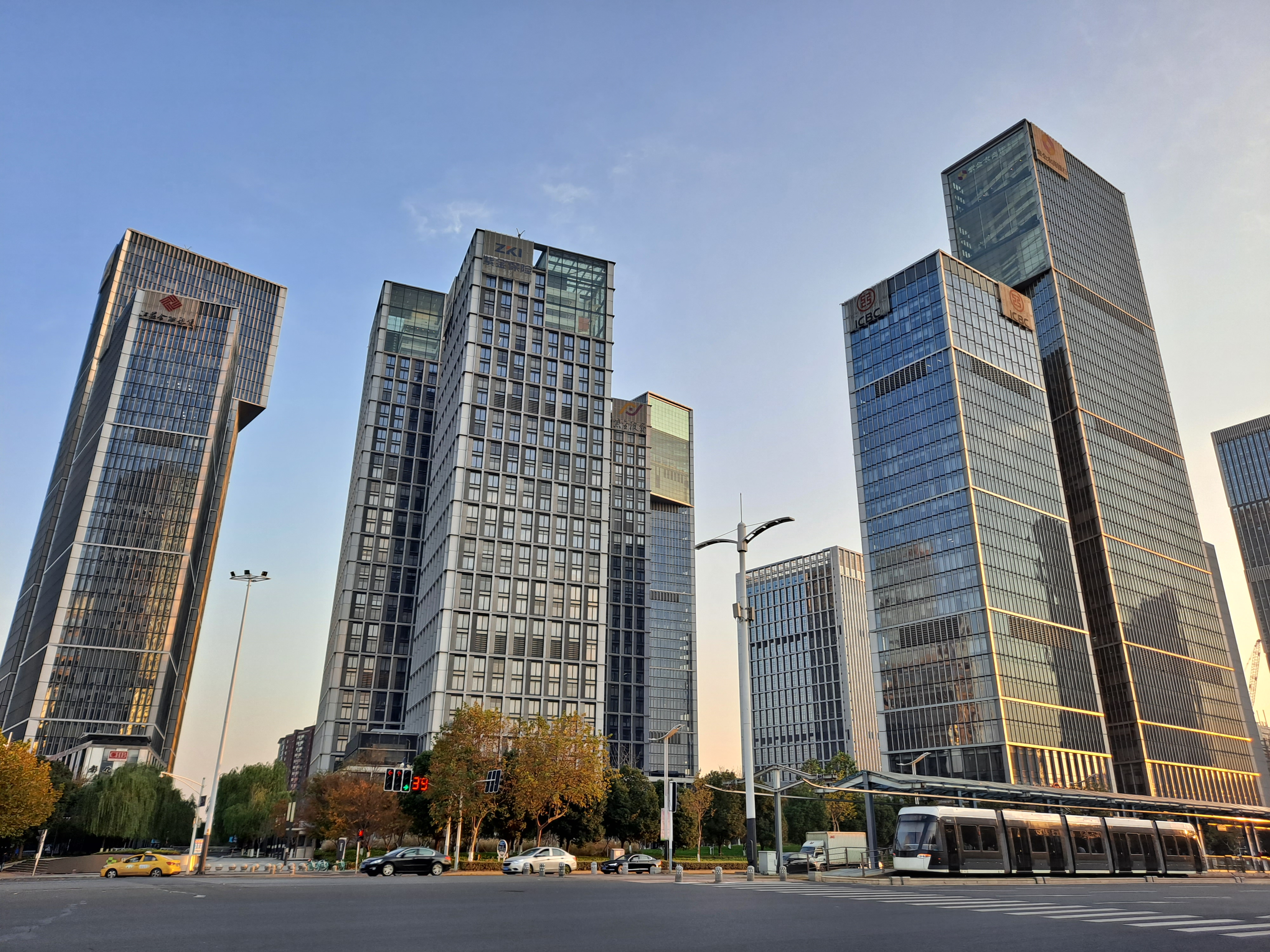
Hexi New Town, Nanjing

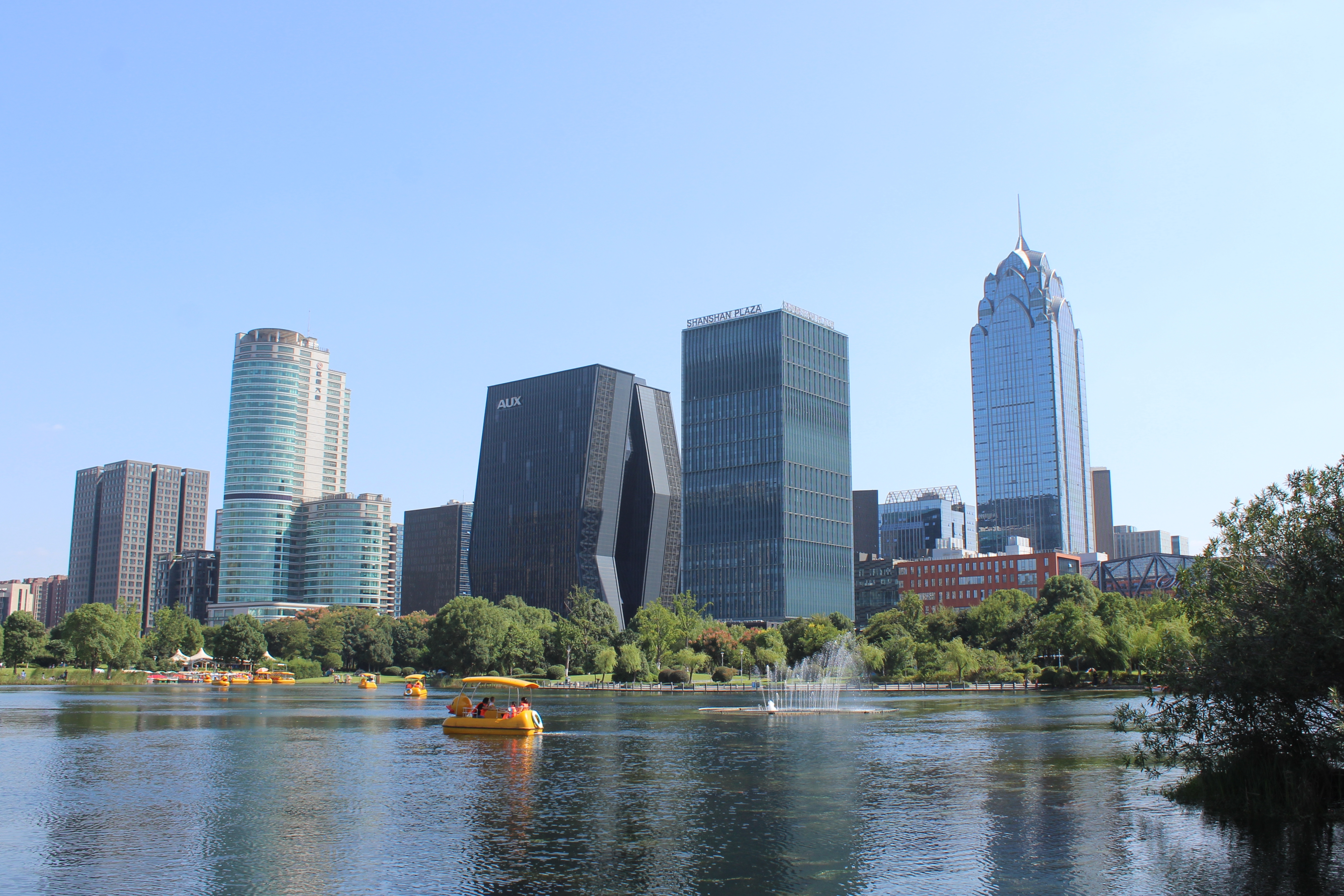
Ningbo South, Ningbo

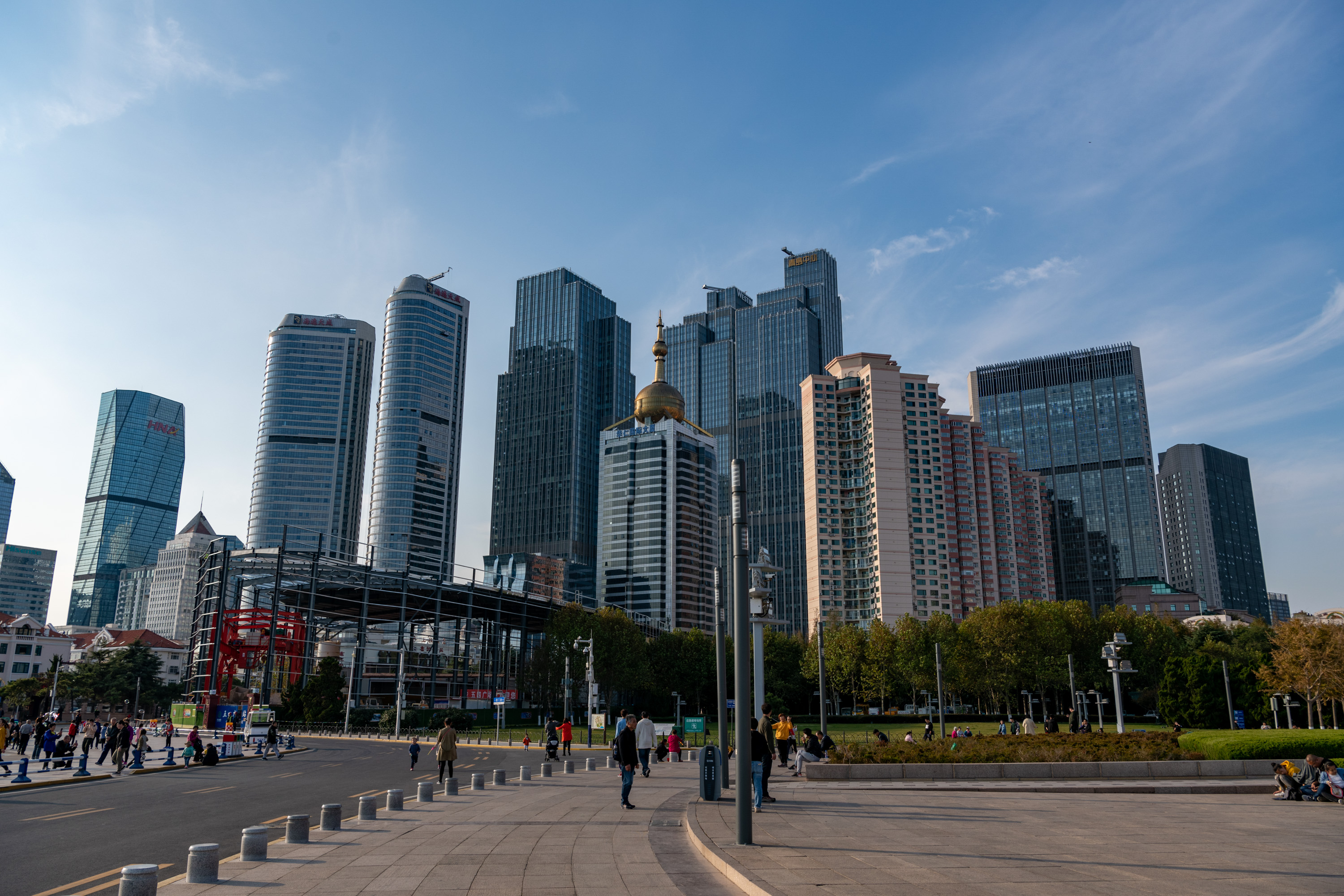
May Fourth Square, Qingdao

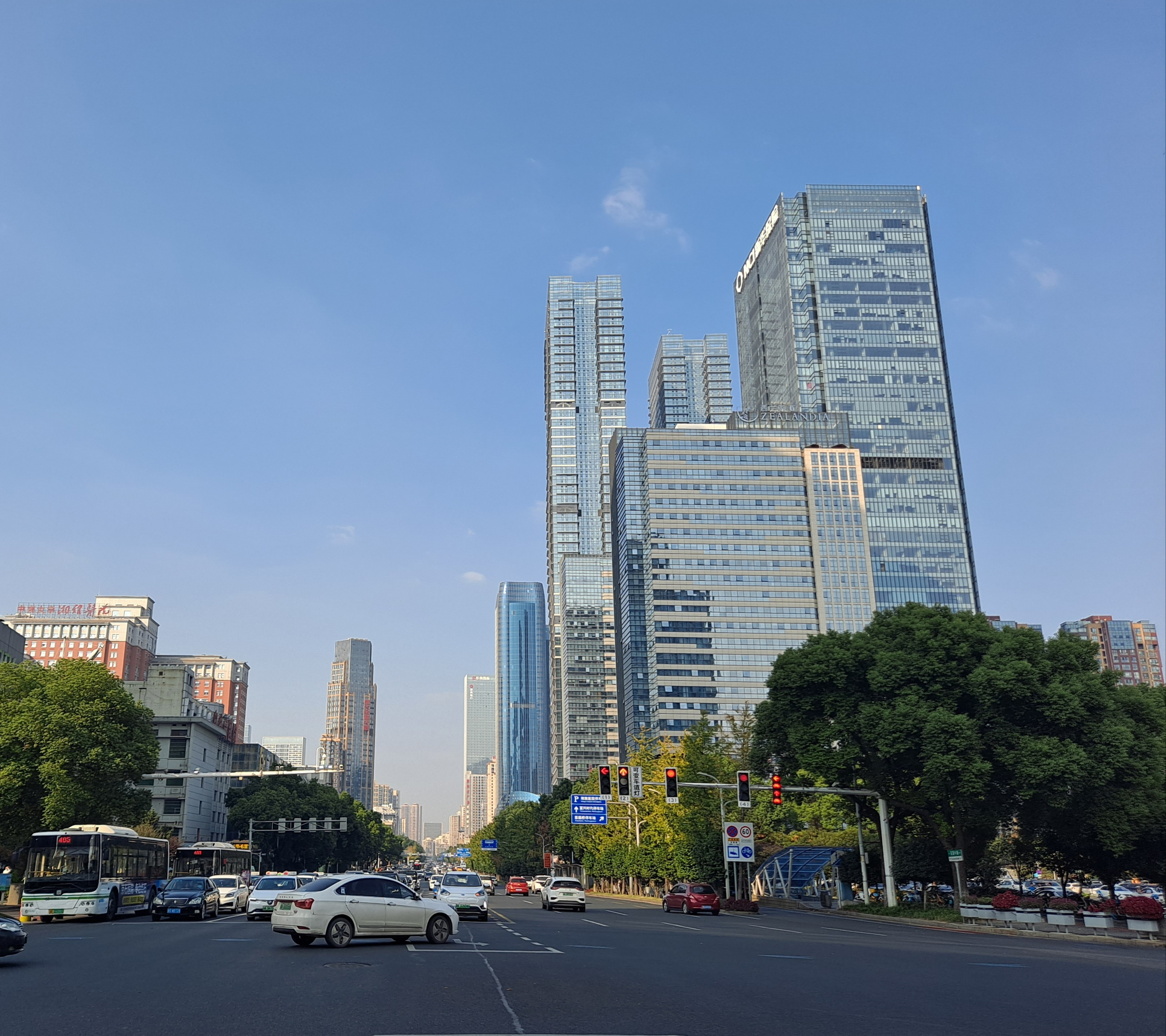
Furong, Changsha

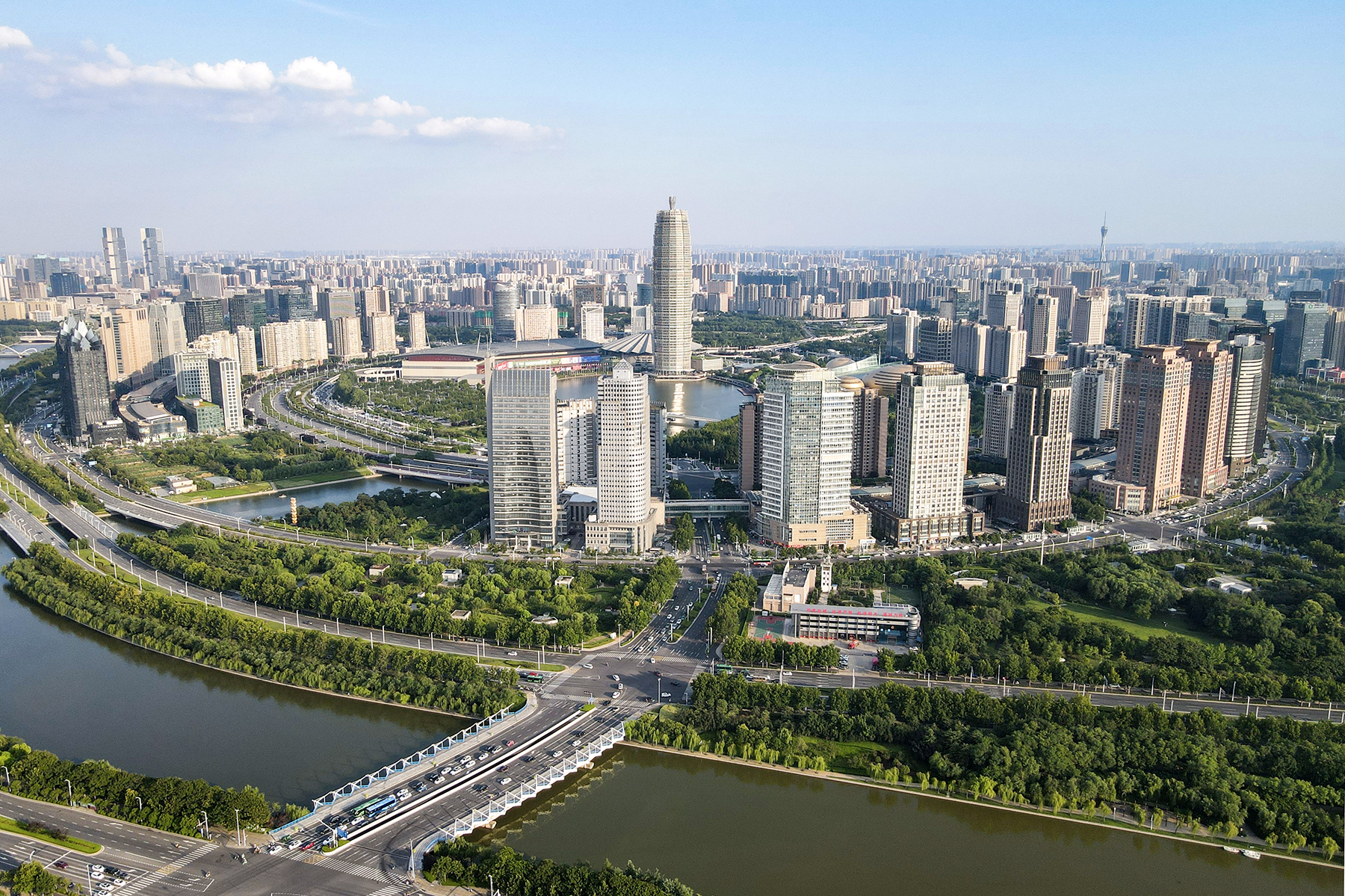
Zhengdong New Area, Zhengzhou

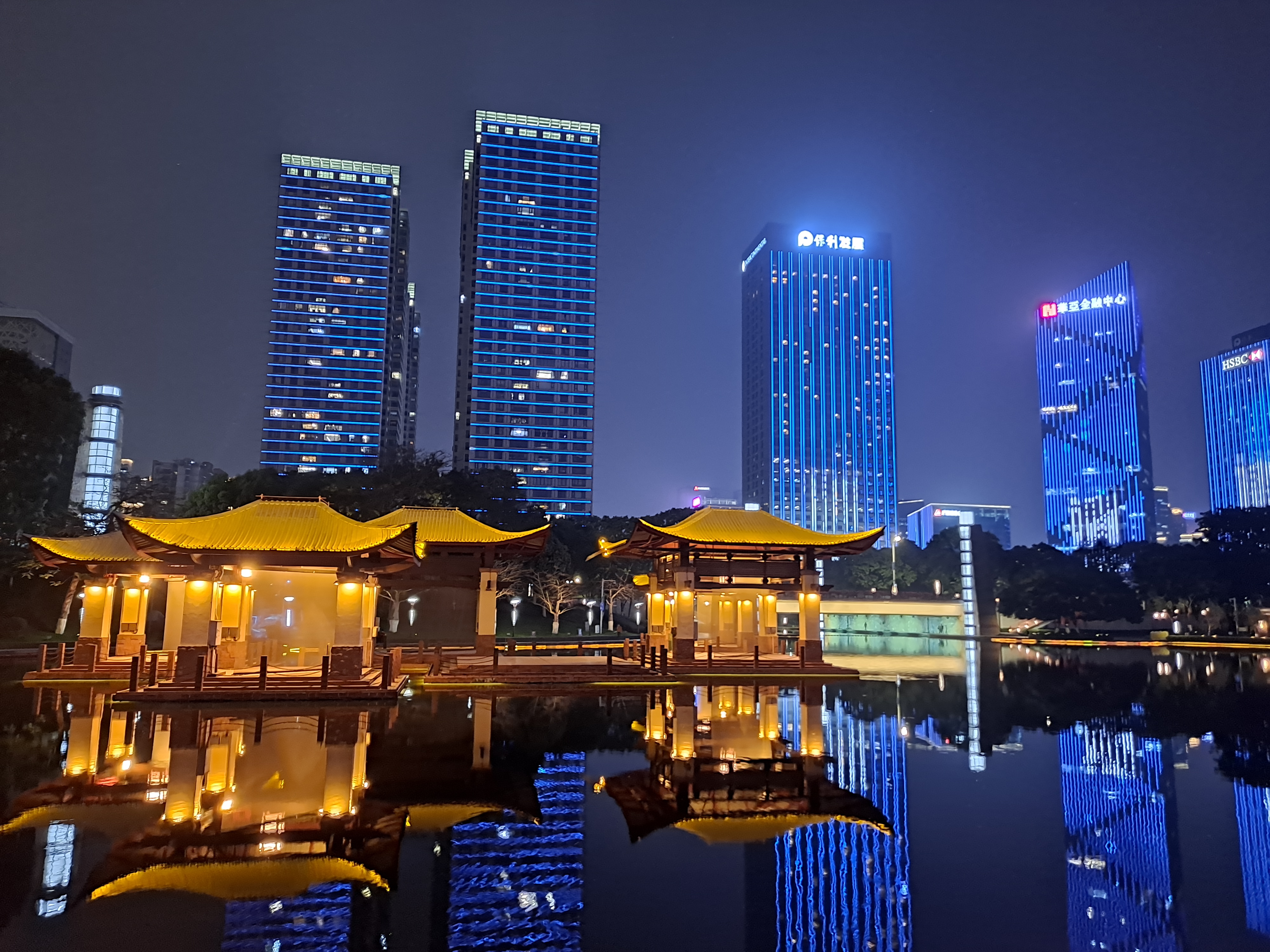
Qiandeng Lake, Foshan

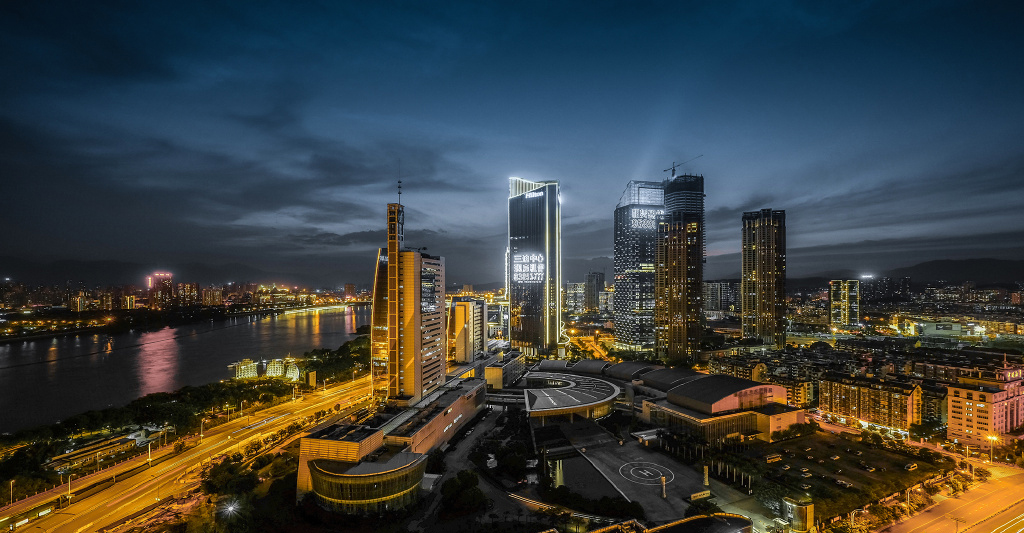
Minjiang North, Fuzhou

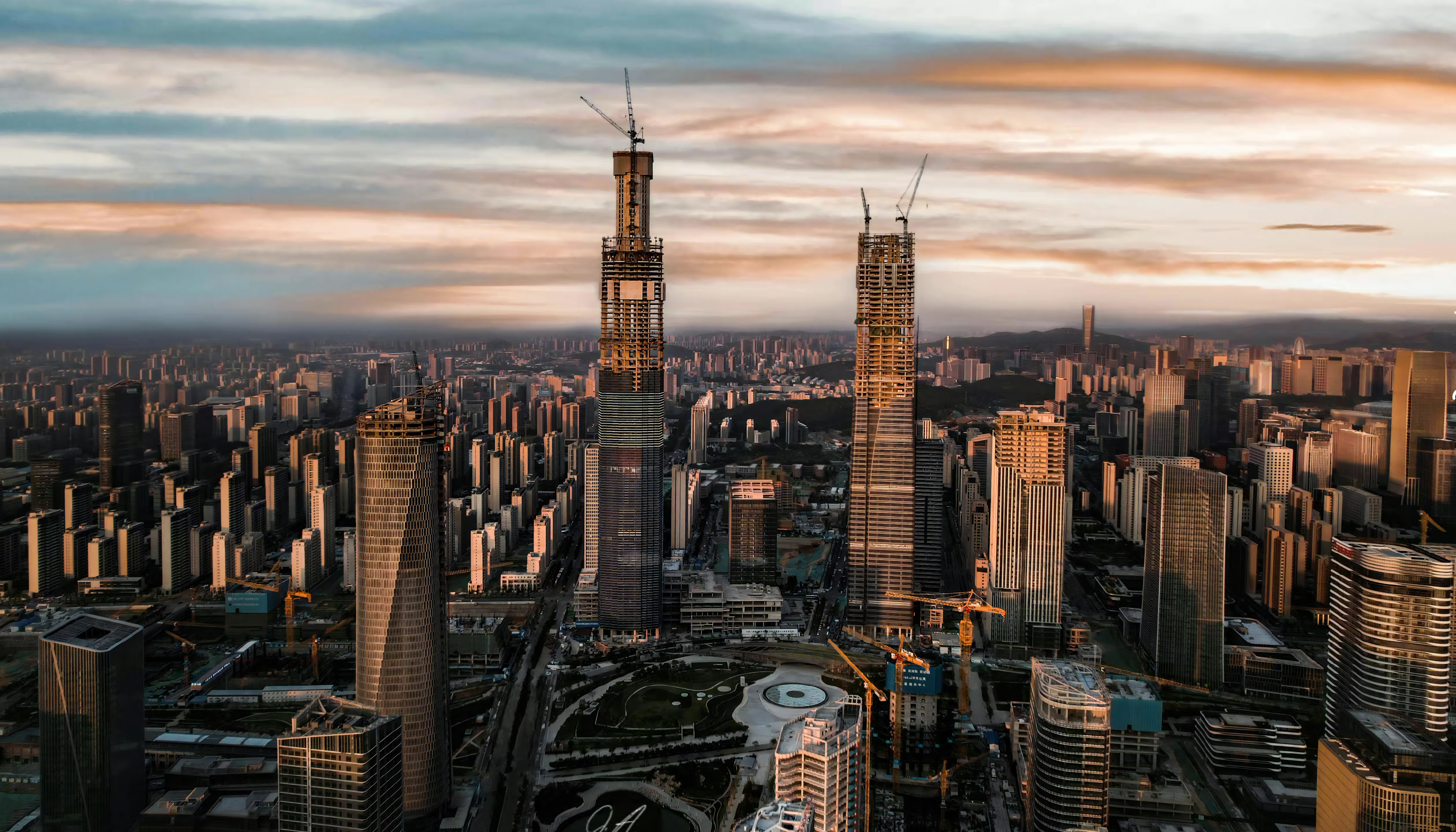
Lixia District, Jinan

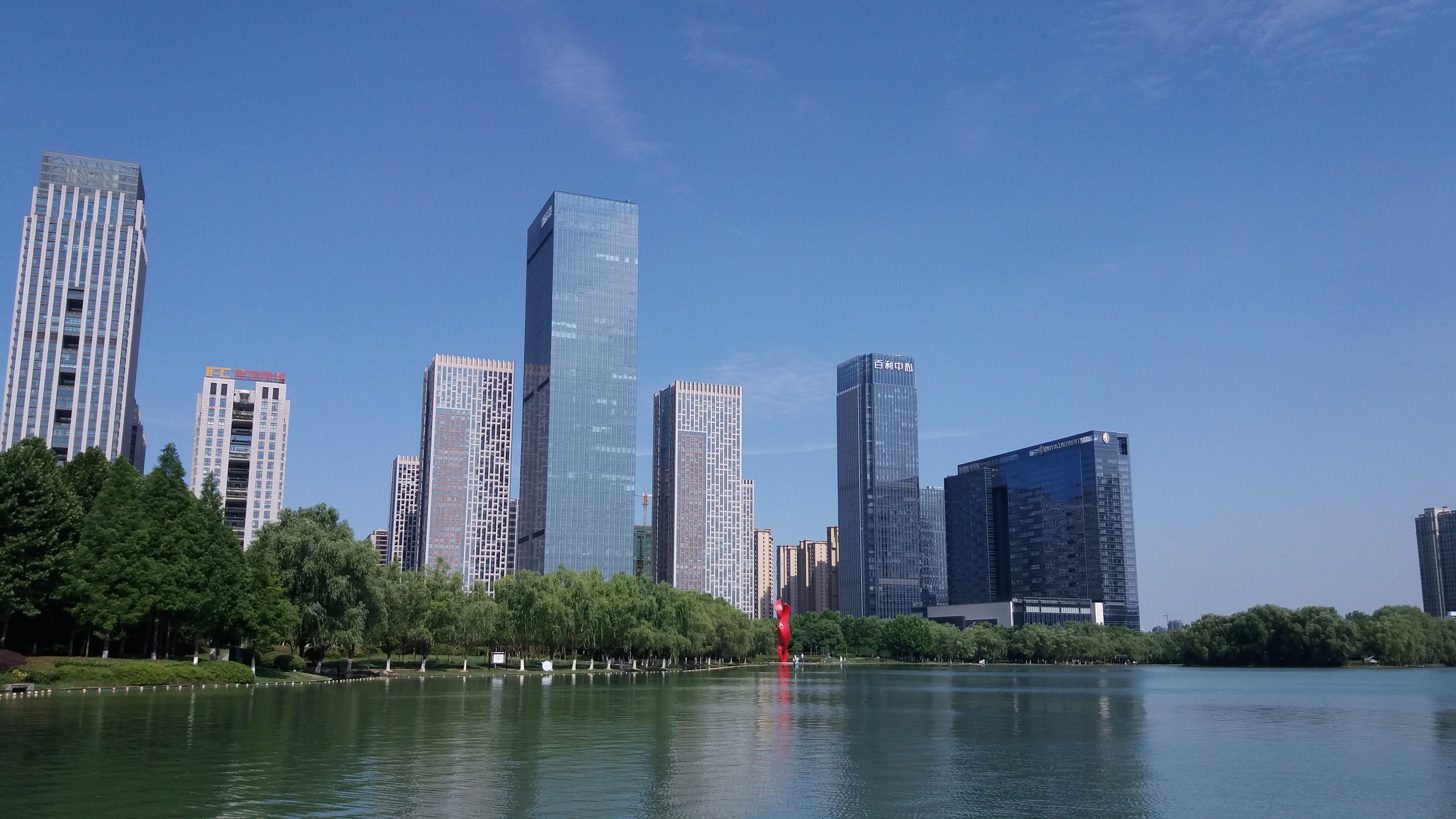
Tian'e Lake, Hefei

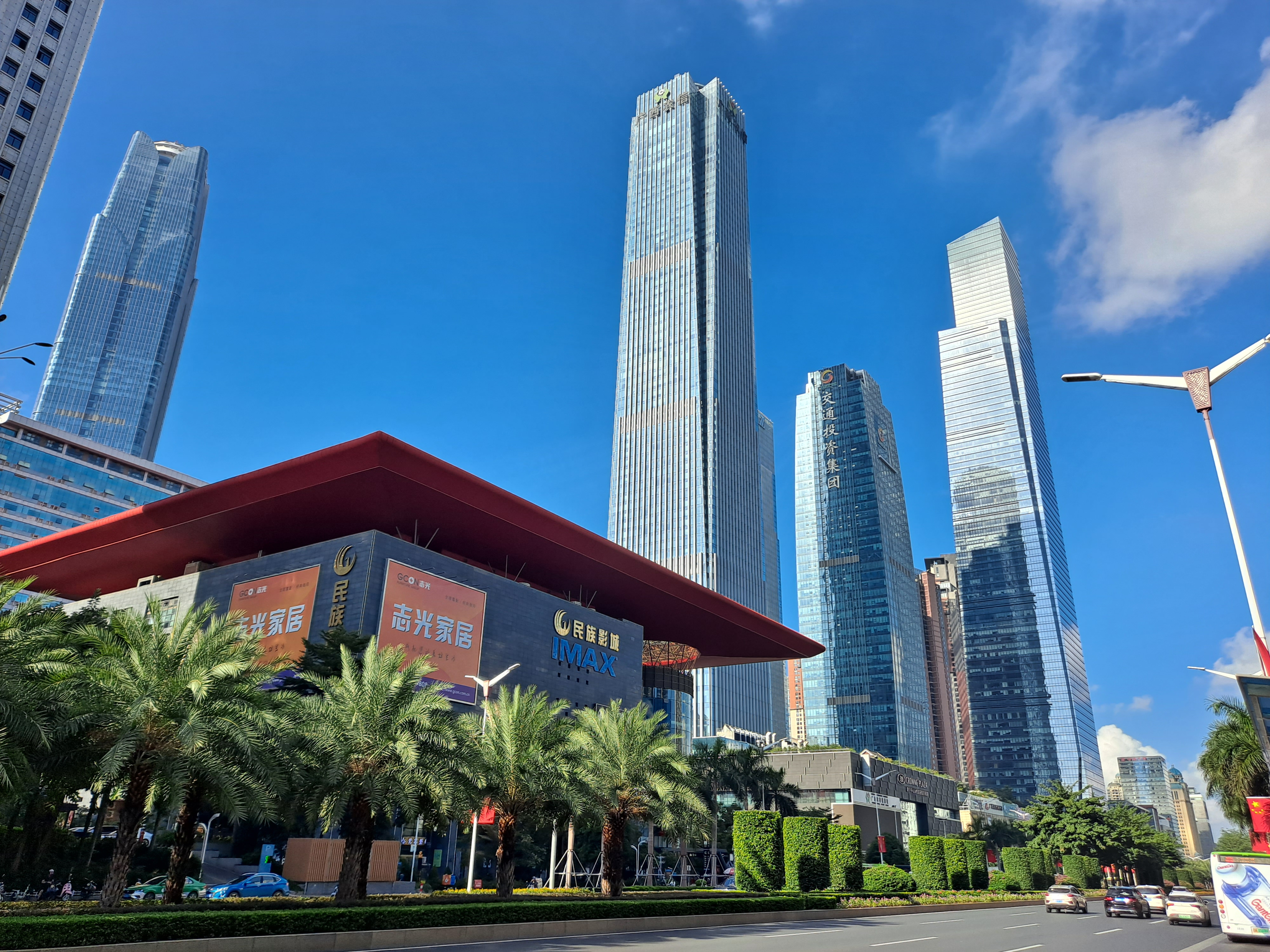
ASEAN Business District, Nanning

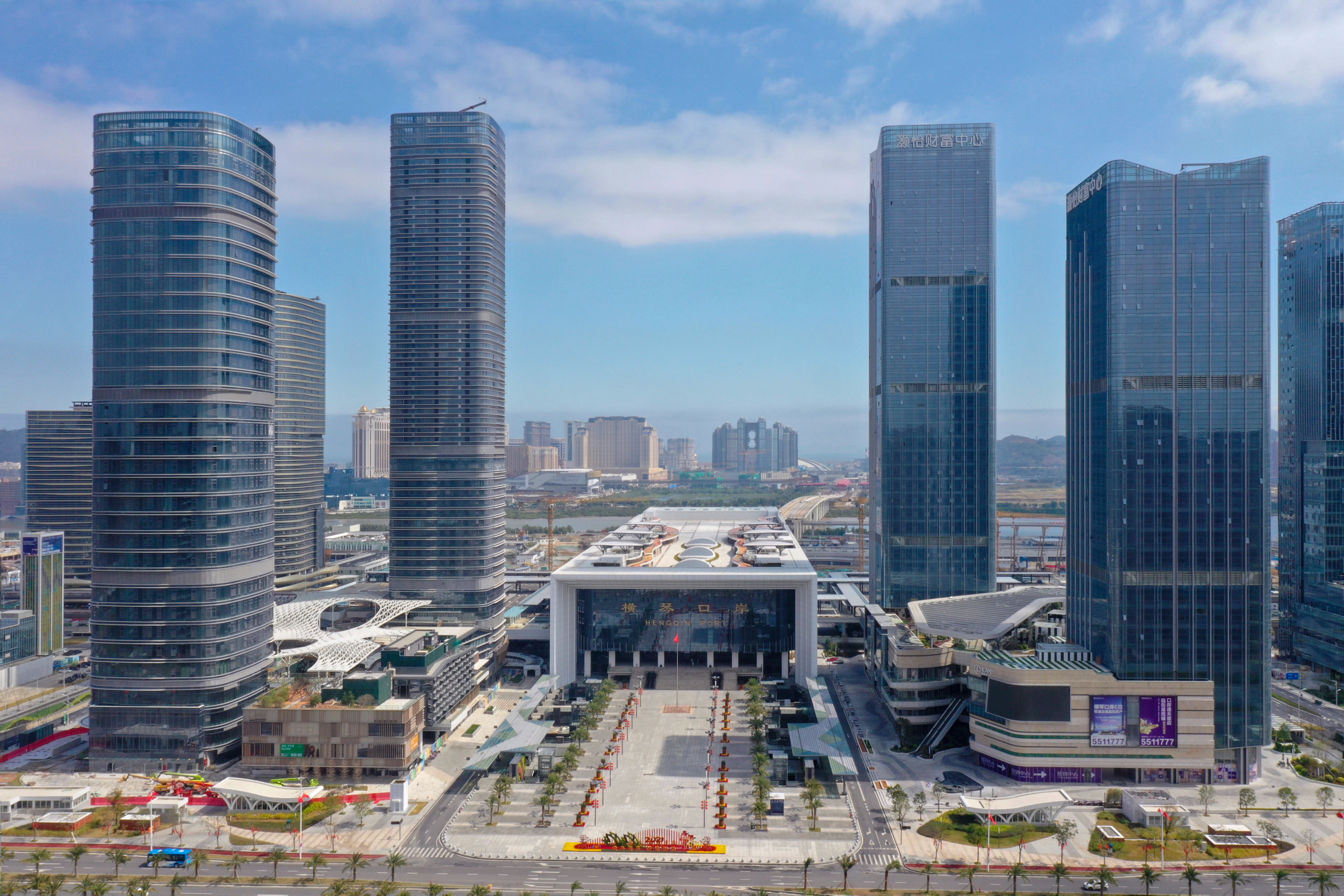
Hengqin, Zhuhai

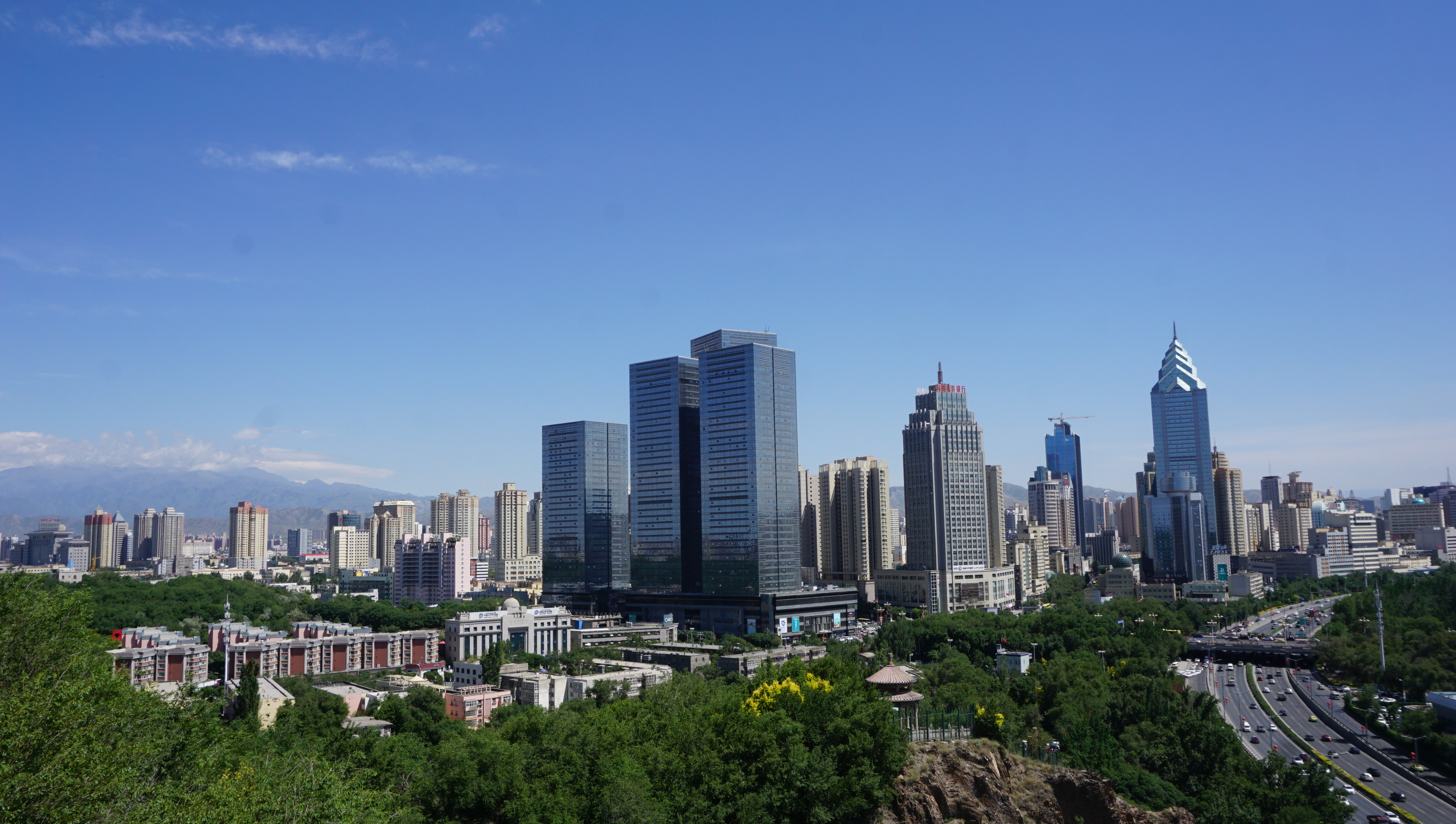
Tianshan District, Ürümqi

== Colombia ==
The largest CBD in Colombia is Bogotá's Centro Internacional, where some of the tallest buildings in South America have been repurposed as national headquarters for Scotiabank Colpatria, Davivienda, and Bancolombia, among others.

Over the years, Bogotá has developed minor business districts, which include Avenida Chile, Ciudad Salitre, with companies like Avianca, Rappi, Johnson & Johnson, Terpel, Hilton, Hyatt, Marriott, Sheraton, Ramada, City Express, Aloft and Novotel; or Complejo Santa Bárbara, the last of which features the only W Hotel in the city.

Colombia's other notable CBDs include Parque Berrío in Medellín, Bocagrande in Cartagena (the largest touristic CBD in the country), and Paseo de Bolívar in Barranquilla.

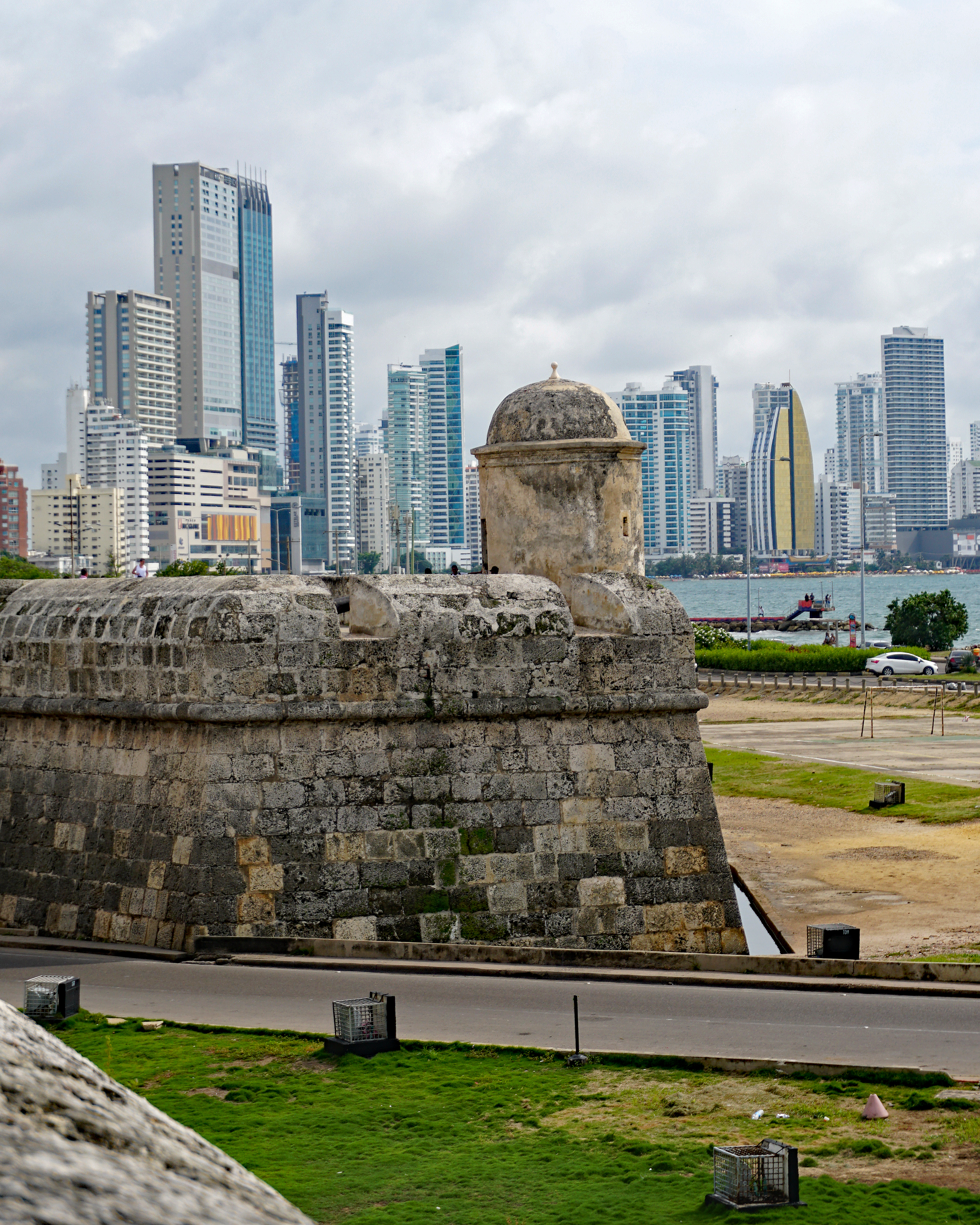
Bocagrande in Cartagena, the largest CBD in Colombia's Caribbean Region

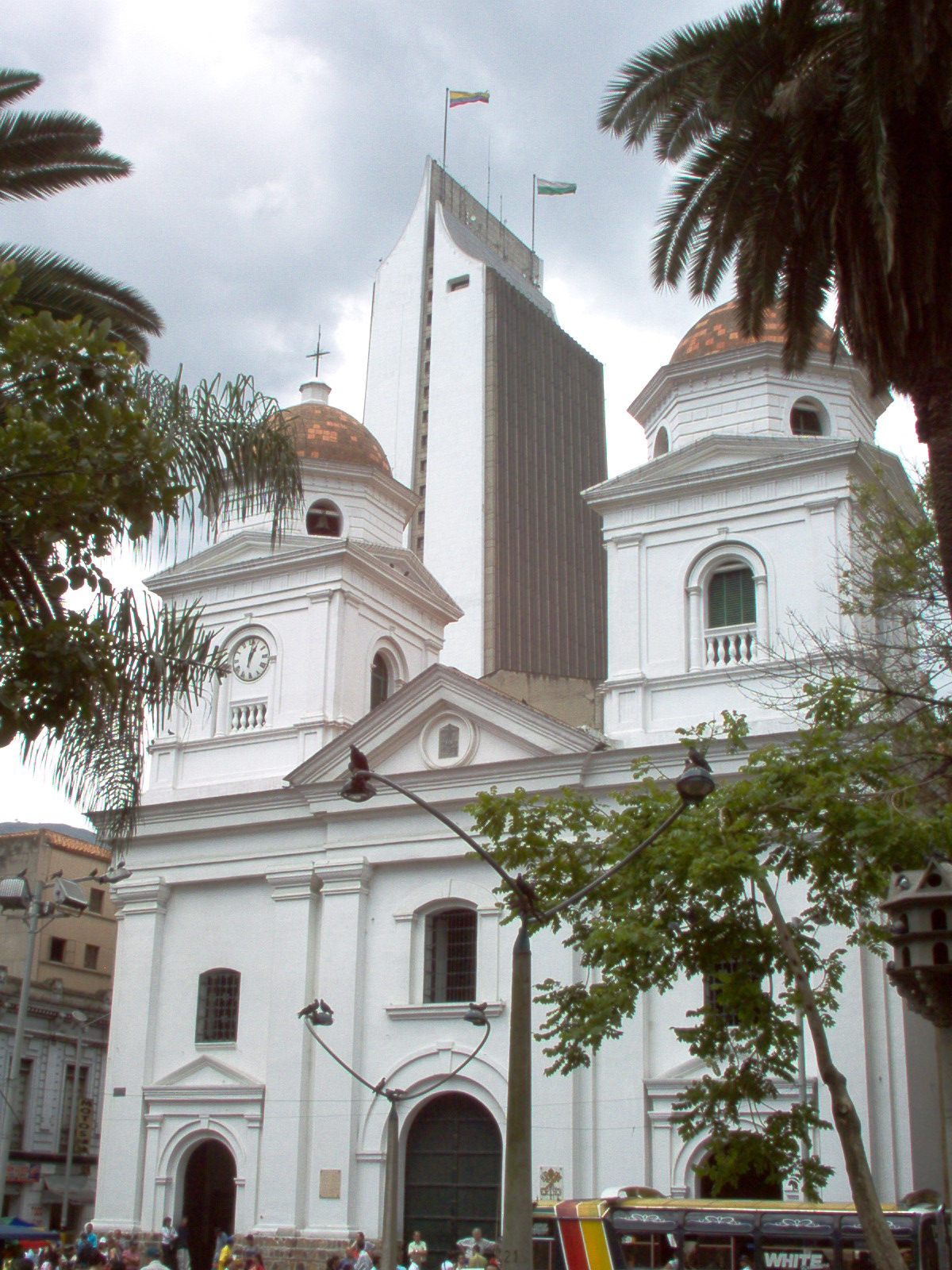
Parque Berrío in Medellín, the second largest CBD in Colombia

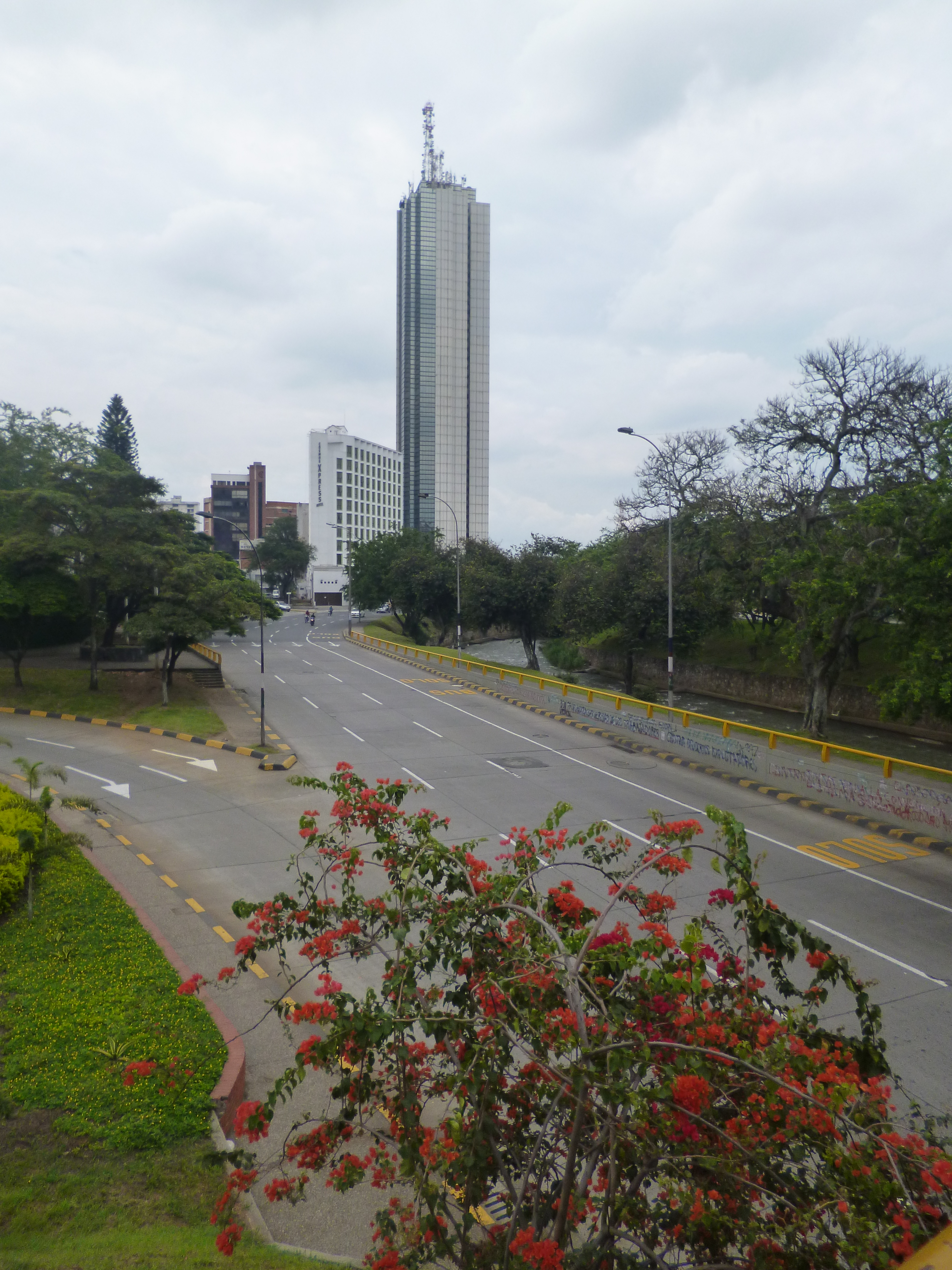
Cali's Downtown it is the largest CBD in Colombia's Pacific Region

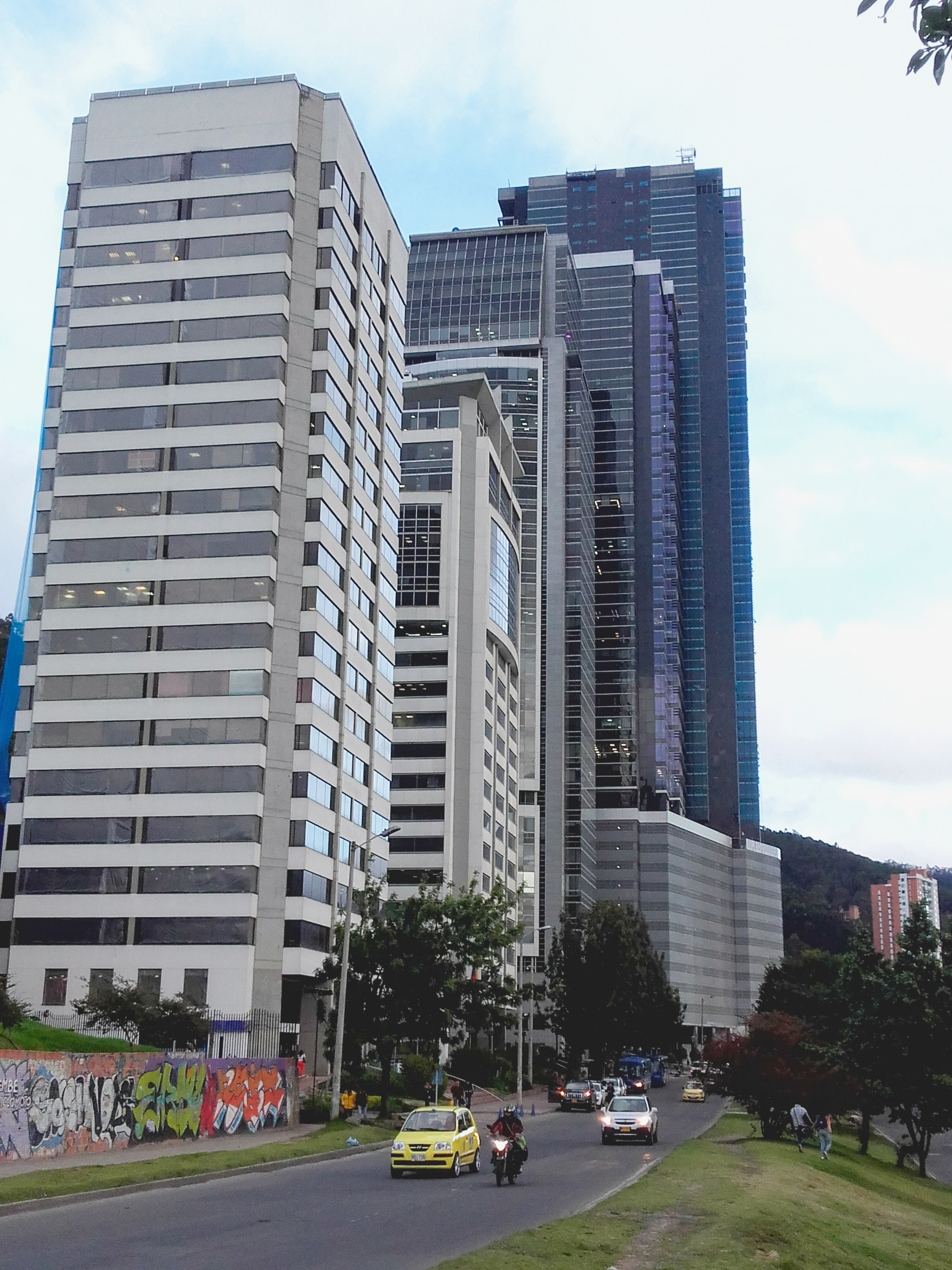
North Point CBD in Bogotá, the third largest in the city.

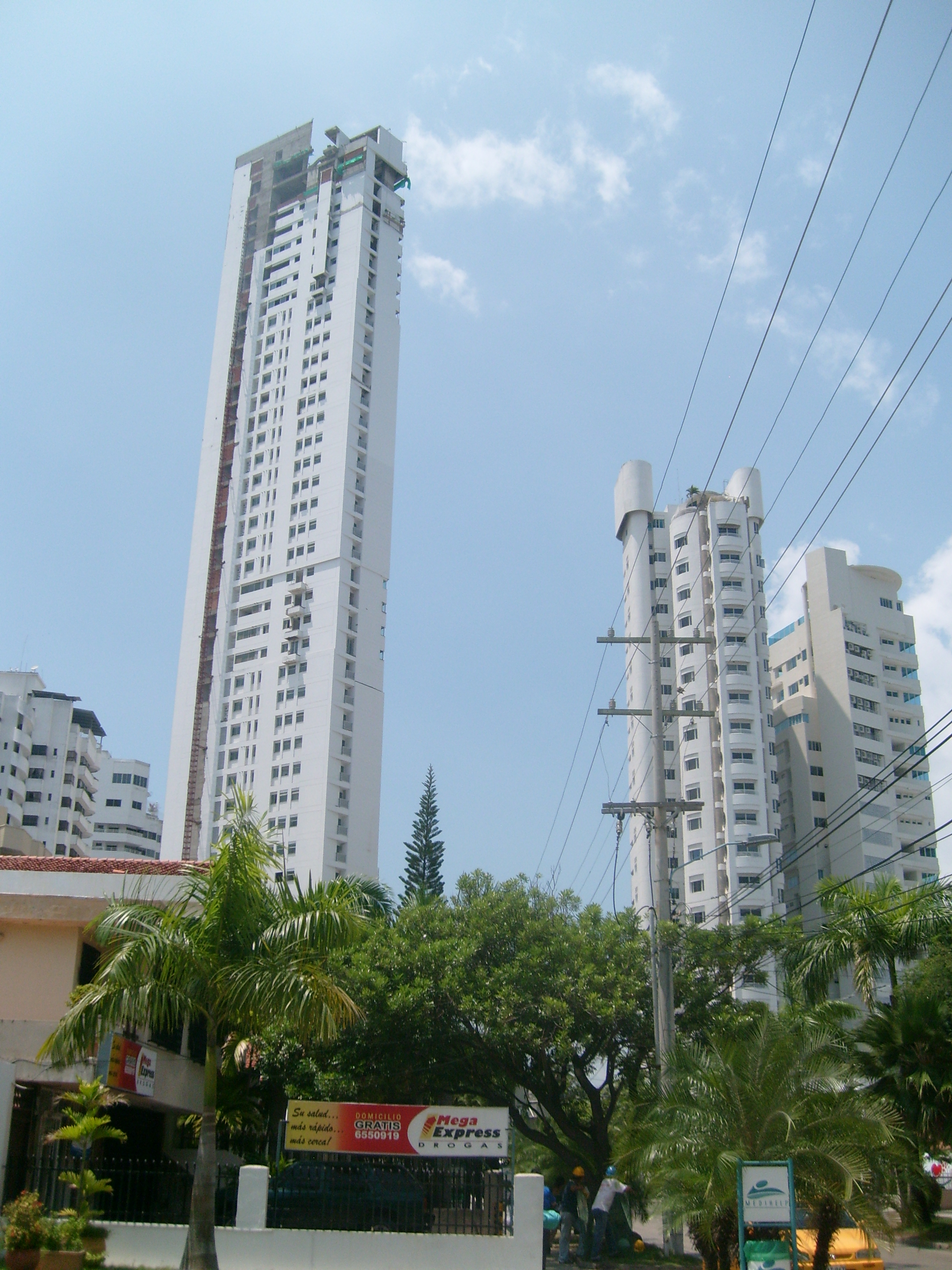
Grand Bay Club in Barranquilla, the second largest CBD in the city

== France ==
La Défense, west of Paris, is France's largest central business district. As of 2025, La Défense was Europe's largest purpose built business district.

La Défense hosts 19 of the world's biggest 500 companies, whilst the Paris region as a whole hosts 29 of the world's 500 largest companies, establishing itself as the first city in Europe (and the third worldwide) for the number of companies classified in Fortune Fortune Global 500.

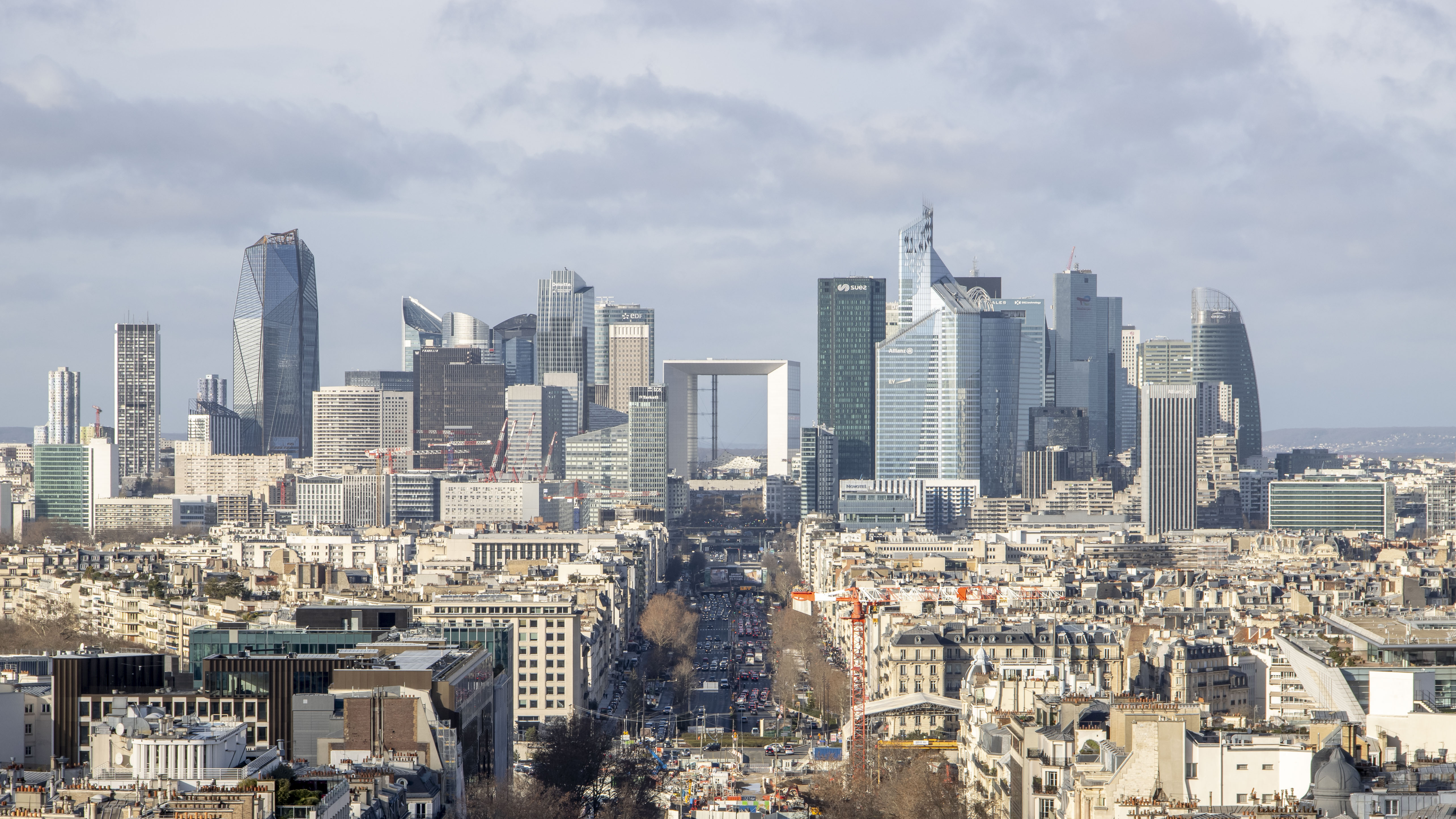
Paris

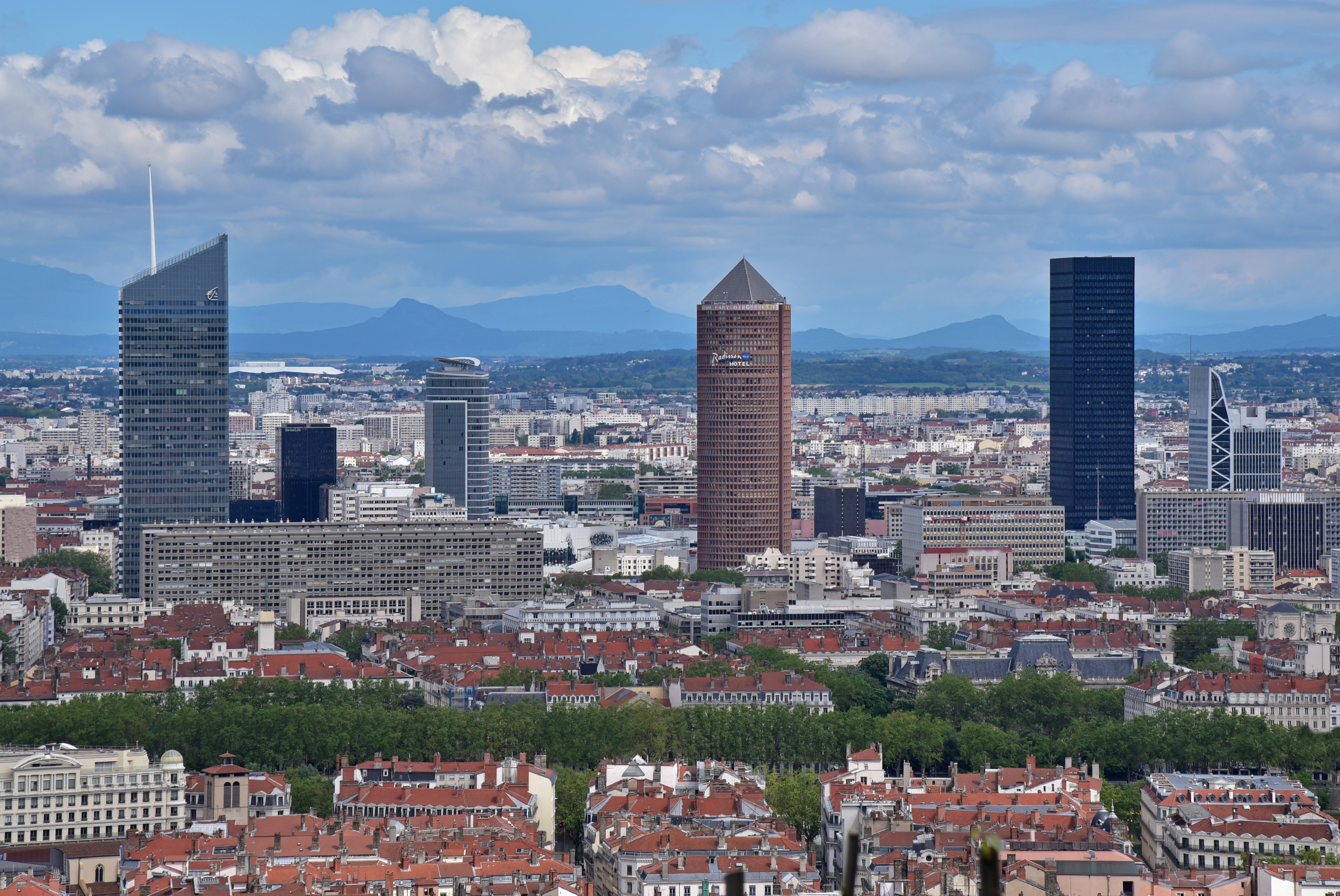
Lyon

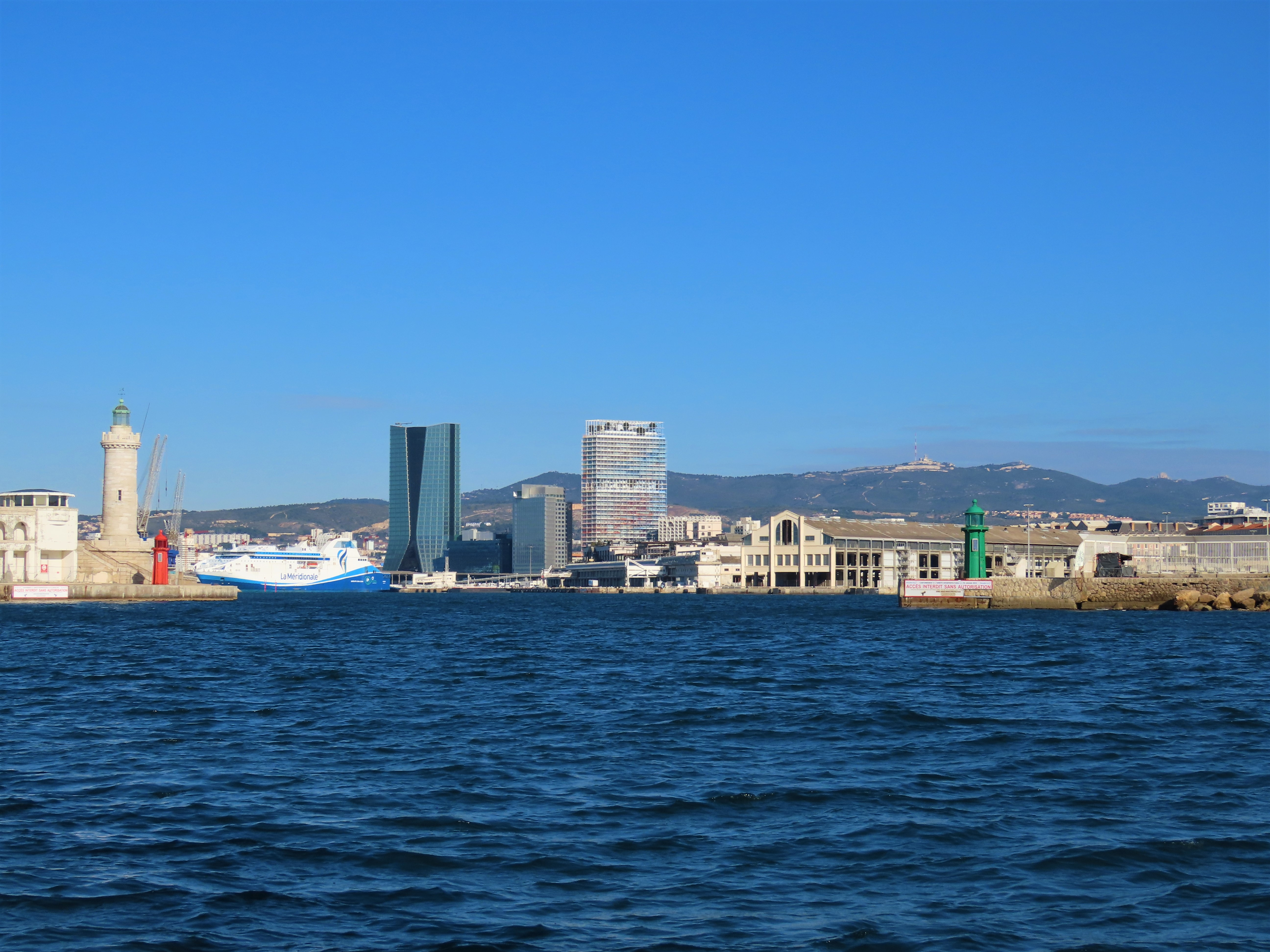
Marseille

La Part-Dieu (French: [la paʁdjø]) is a central business district in the 3rd arrondissement of Lyon, France. It is the second-largest tertiary district in France, after La Défense in Greater Paris. The area also contains Lyon's principal railway station, Gare de La Part-Dieu. Euroméditerranée is a business area in Marseille.

== Germany ==
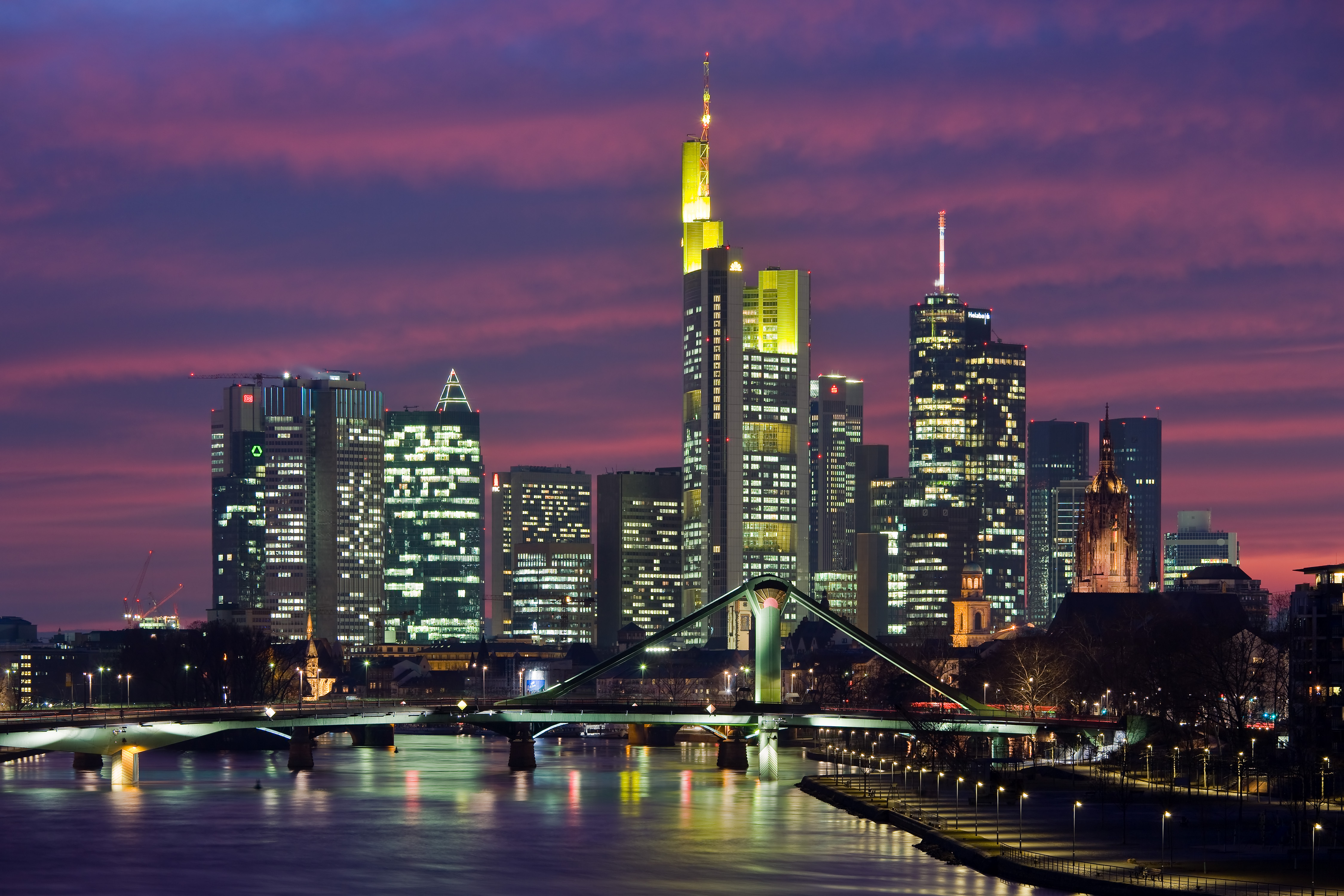
Central business district of Frankfurt, Germany

In Germany, the terms Innenstadt and Stadtzentrum may be used to describe the central business district. These terms can be literally translated as "inner city" and "city center". Some of the larger cities have more than one central business district. For example, Berlin alone has three.

Due to Berlin's history of division during the Cold War, the city contains central business districts both in West (Kurfürstendamm) and in East Berlin (Alexanderplatz), as well as a newly built business district near the Potsdamer Platz. The city's historic center (home to the Reichstag building, as well as the Brandenburg Gate and most federal ministries) was largely abandoned when the Berlin Wall cut through the area. Only after the reunification with the redevelopment of Potsdamer Platz, and the construction of numerous shopping centers, government ministries, embassies, office buildings and entertainment venues, was the area revived.

In Frankfurt am Main's city center, there is a business district called the "Bankenviertel".

In Düsseldorf, there is a business district which is located around the famous high street Königsallee with banks, shops and offices.

== Hong Kong ==
Traditionally, the Central Business District "CBD" of Hong Kong is Central, where many multinational financial services corporations have their headquarters. Consulates general and consulates of many countries are also located in this area, as is Government Hill, the site of the old government headquarters. As the Hong Kong SAR Government Headquarters moved to Tamar, Admiralty, the nearby area is also considered part of the CBD.

In Quarry Bay, Taikoo Place and areas nearby, including Admiralty, Wan Chai and Causeway Bay, and Tsim Sha Tsui, Kwun Tong, and Kowloon Bay are regarded as major business districts of Hong Kong.

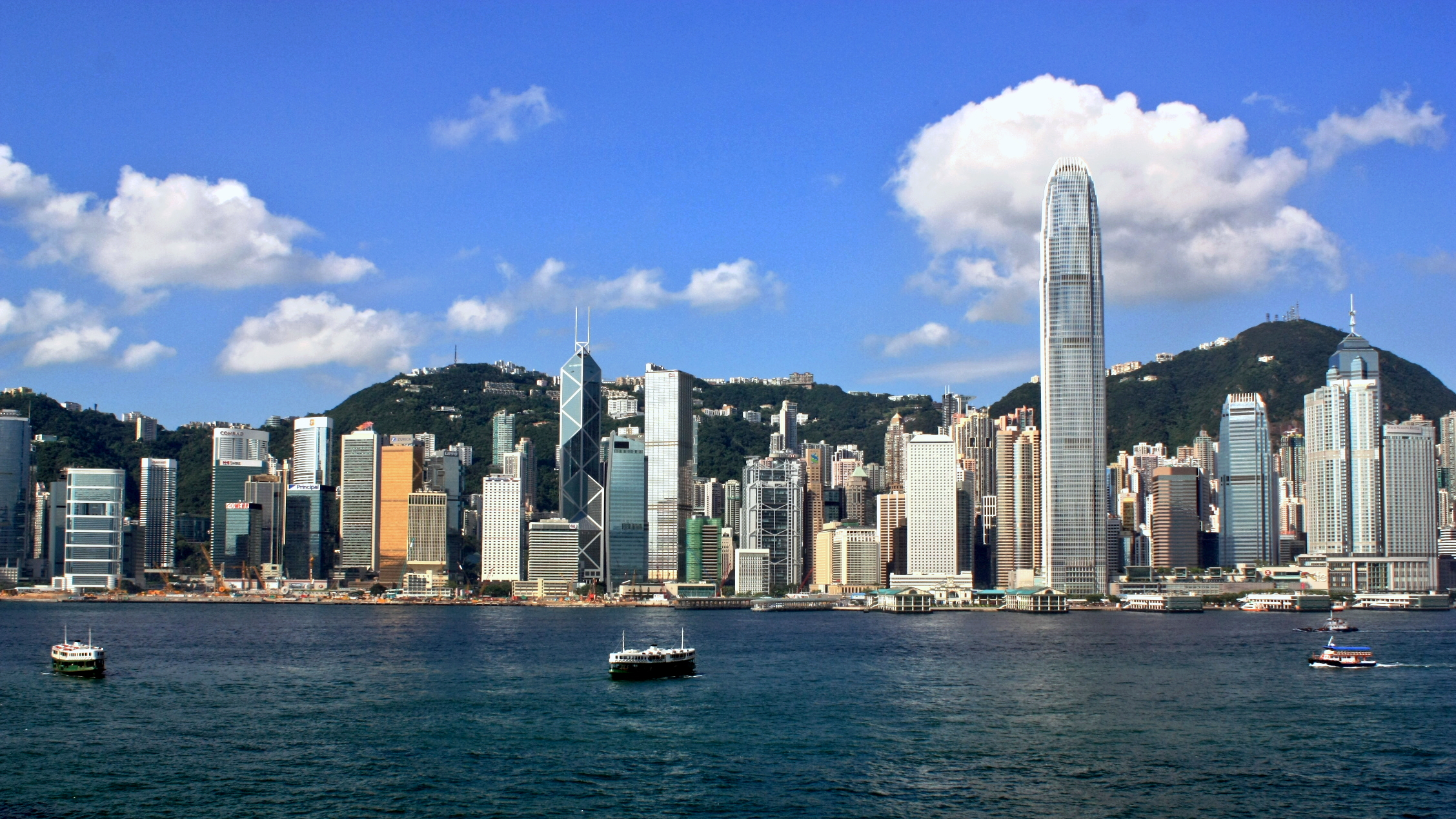
Central and Admiralty

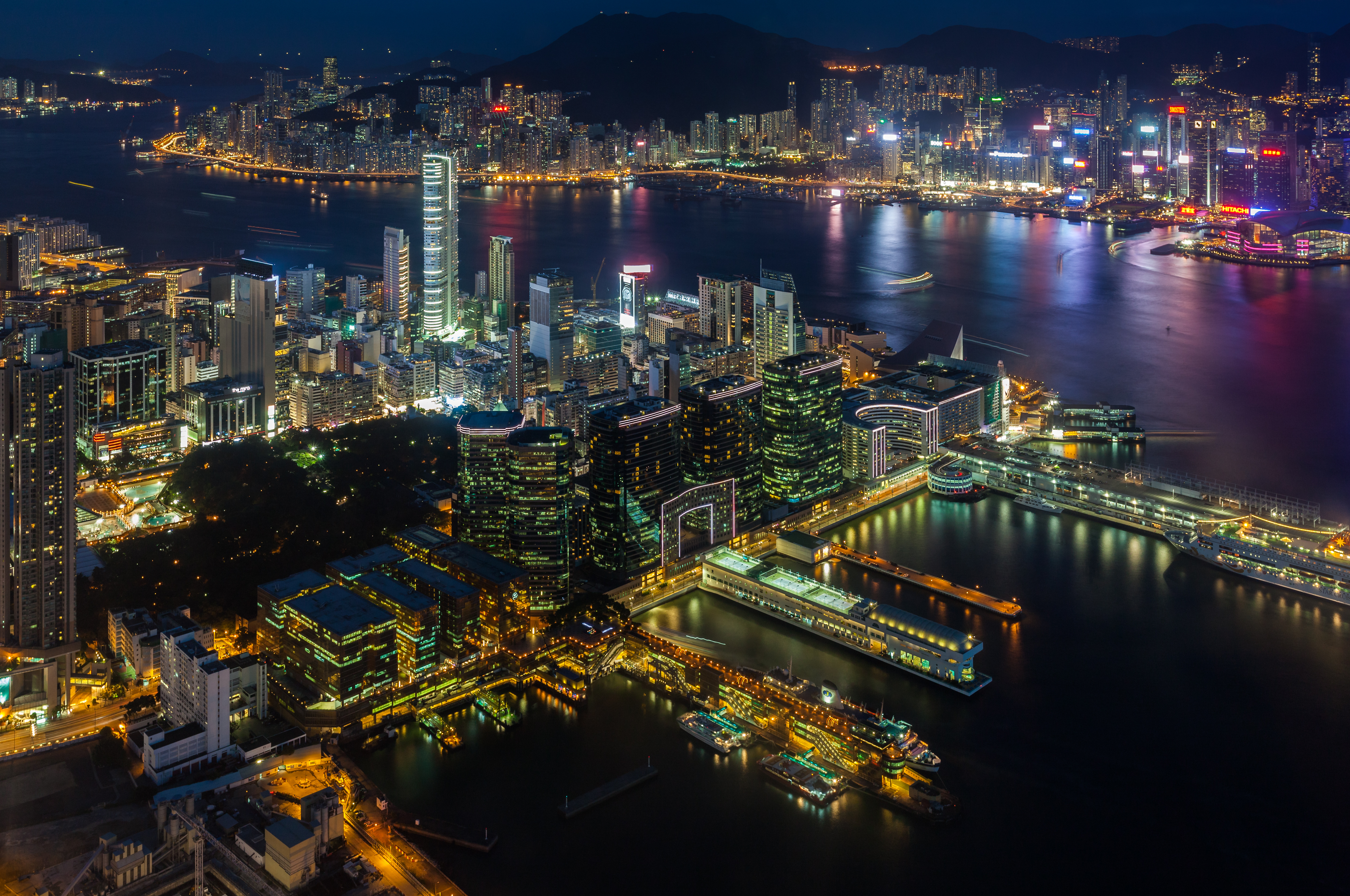
Tsim Sha Tsui

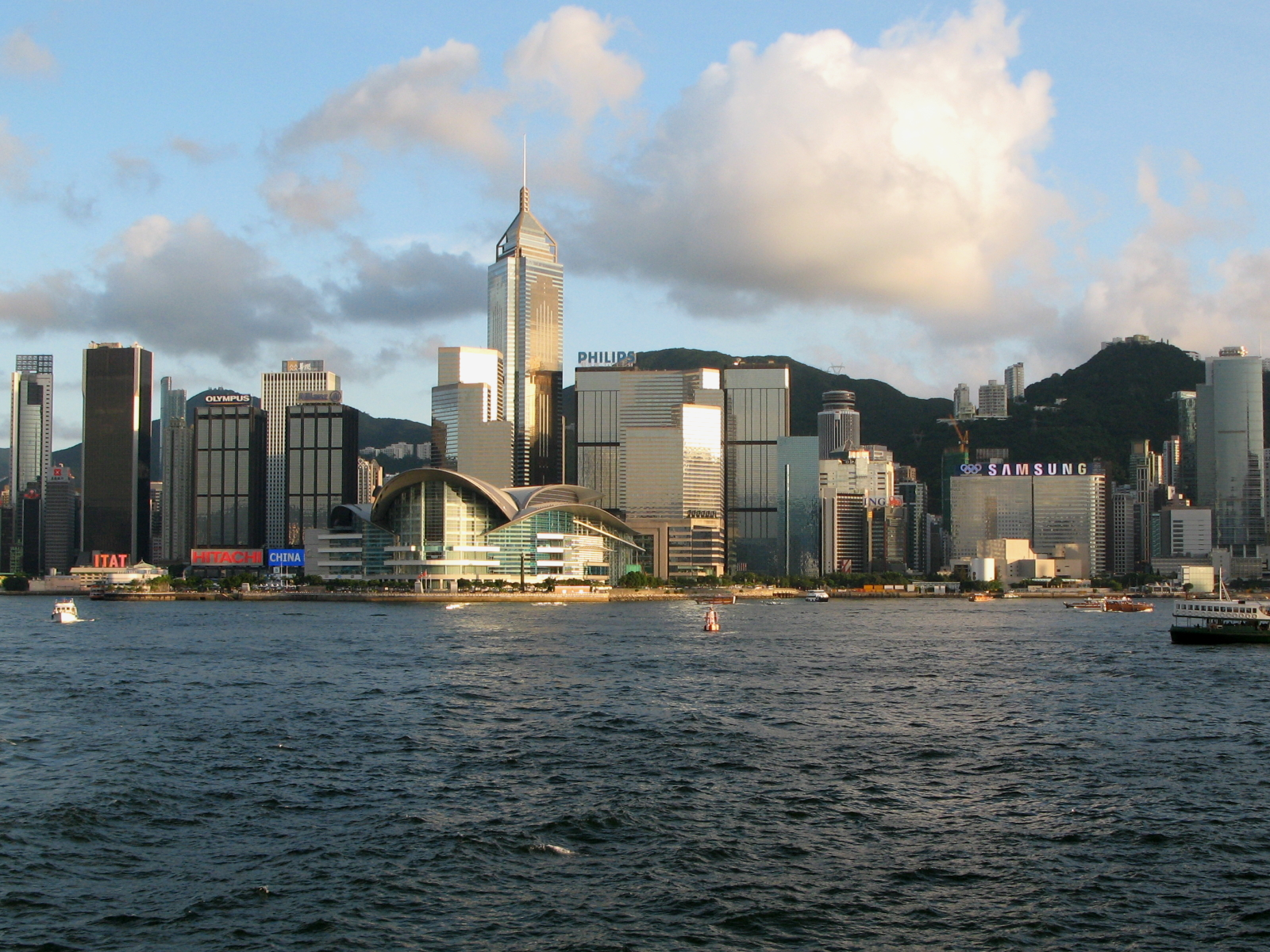
Wan Chai

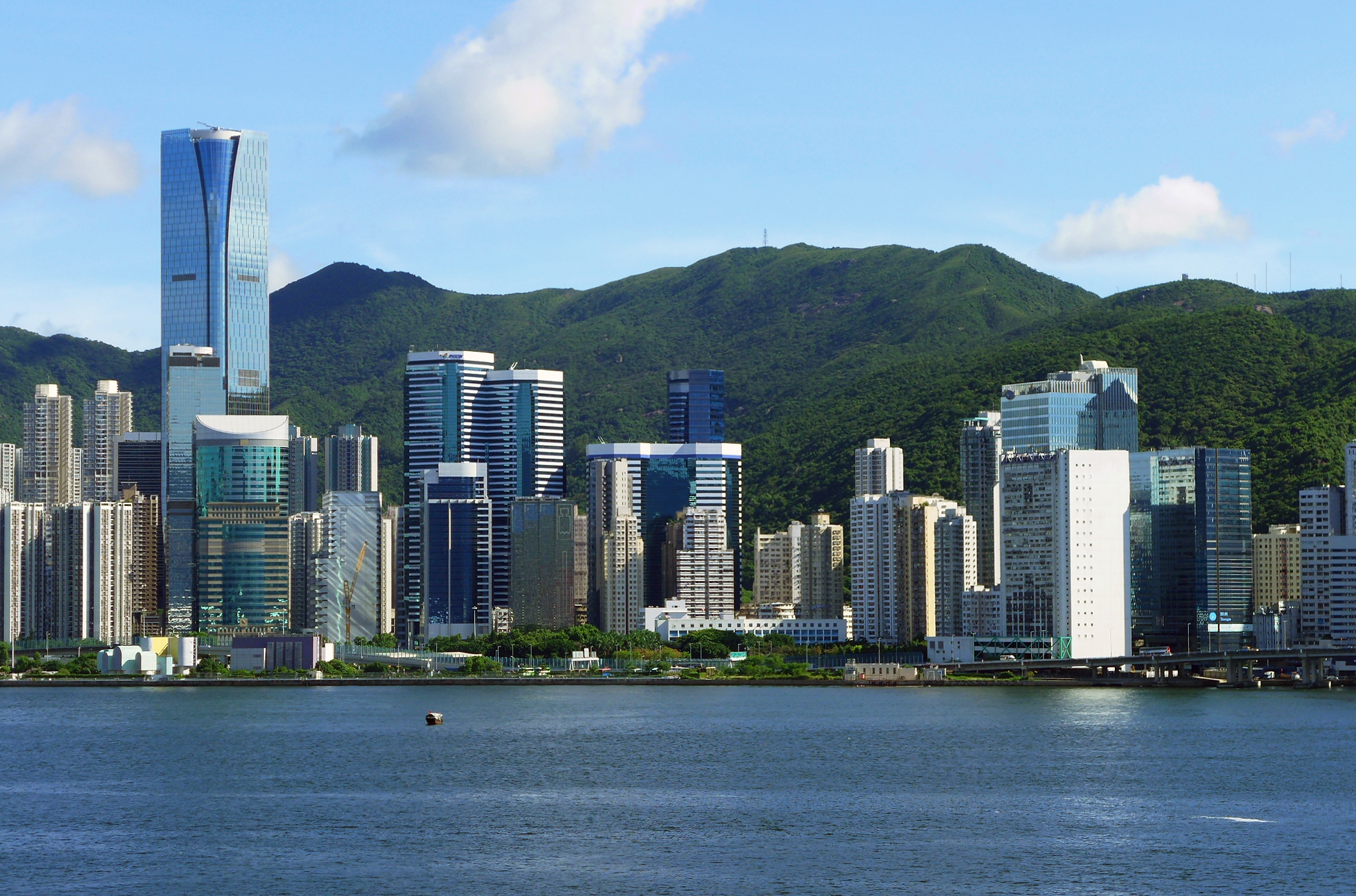
Quarry Bay

== India ==
India has no single national central business district; each major metropolis developed its own CBD, and in several cities a colonial-era commercial core has since been supplemented — or substantially overtaken — by purpose-built financial districts on the periphery. As of mid-2025, India's total office stock stood at roughly 993 million square feet, making it the world's fourth-largest office market by area after the United States, China, and Japan; nationally, about 19 percent of this stock sits within traditional CBDs, with 45 percent in suburban business districts (SBDs) and 36 percent in peripheral business districts (PBDs), reflecting a broad structural shift of occupiers away from historic city centres toward newer corridors.

=== Mumbai ===
Nariman Point, on the southern tip of Marine Drive in South Mumbai, is generally regarded as India's first central business district. The area was reclaimed from the Arabian Sea beginning in the 1940s at the initiative of Bombay Municipal Corporation leader Khursheed Framji "Veer" Nariman, after whom it is named. From the 1970s through the 1990s it served as Mumbai's principal commercial hub, housing the headquarters of institutions such as Air India and the Reserve Bank of India alongside major hotels, and at one point commanded some of the highest commercial rents in the world. Today the Mumbai Metropolitan Region's CBD proper — encompassing Nariman Point, Cuffe Parade, Ballard Estate, Fort, Worli, Parel, and Lower Parel — accounts for only about 15 percent of the region's office stock, with rents in the INR 190–277 per square foot range, well below the peaks of the 1990s.

Hemmed in by the sea on three sides with no room to expand, Nariman Point gradually ceded ground from the 1990s onward to the Bandra Kurla Complex (BKC), which the Mumbai Metropolitan Region Development Authority (MMRDA) began developing on reclaimed marshland in 1977 as a "growth centre" to decongest South Mumbai. Spanning roughly 370 hectares along the Mithi River and classified as a suburban business district, BKC now houses the National Stock Exchange, the Securities and Exchange Board of India, the headquarters of numerous domestic and multinational banks, and the consulates of the United States, United Kingdom, France, and Australia, commanding rents as high as INR 427 per square foot — among the highest in the country.

=== Delhi and the National Capital Region ===
Connaught Place (officially Rajiv Chowk) was purpose-built as the central business district of Lutyens' Delhi. Constructed between 1929 and 1933 to a circular Georgian design by architect Robert Tor Russell, loosely modelled on the Royal Crescent in Bath, it remains one of India's oldest established office markets and has long housed the headquarters of numerous Indian firms alongside international banks, law offices, and retail arranged around its Inner, Middle, and Outer Circles. The National Capital Region is unusual among Indian metropolitan areas in retaining a genuinely substantial CBD share of its office stock — about 44 percent, the highest of any major Indian city — split between Connaught Place and Barakhamba Road in Delhi proper and the DLF Cyber City and Qutub Enclave districts of Gurugram, which are themselves classified as core CBD rather than merely suburban.

Since the early 2000s, growth in commercial space across the region has shifted increasingly toward the satellite city of Gurugram, where DLF's Cyber City, established in 2003 on National Highway 8 at the Delhi–Gurugram border, has grown into one of India's largest integrated business districts, with close to 15 million square feet of Grade-A office and retail space occupied by Fortune 500 companies and global capability centres of firms including Microsoft, Google, American Express, and JPMorgan Chase. Rents across the NCR's CBD zones range from roughly INR 82 to over INR 390 per square foot depending on submarket, among the widest spreads of any Indian city, reflecting the coexistence of legacy Delhi office stock with premium Gurugram towers. The adjoining DLF Cyber Hub complex is one of the region's largest dining and entertainment precincts, serving the district's workforce.

=== Bengaluru ===
Bengaluru's central business district occupies roughly the area within a seven-kilometre radius of Vidhana Soudha, the seat of the Karnataka Legislature, and combines heritage structures such as the Bangalore Fort and the old Bangalore Pete with modern commercial development along MG Road, Residency Road, Cunningham Road, and Brigade Road. Unusually for an Indian metropolis, Bengaluru's CBD now accounts for only around 9 percent of citywide office stock — the lowest CBD share of any major Indian city — with the great majority of the market having migrated to peripheral IT corridors such as Whitefield and Electronic City, a shift Knight Frank Research attributes to the city's IT/ITeS-led growth model and the scarcity of large contiguous plots in the historic core. Its most prominent CBD landmark remains UB City, a mixed-use high-rise complex of four towers developed jointly by the UB Group and Prestige Group on Vittal Mallya Road opposite Cubbon Park, which anchors the district's skyline together with the state legislature building.

=== Hyderabad ===
Hyderabad's historic CBD was centred on Banjara Hills, Jubilee Hills, and Begumpet, but the city's commercial centre of gravity has since shifted decisively toward the suburban and peripheral IT corridors of HITEC City, Gachibowli, and Kondapur. HITEC City (Hyderabad Information Technology and Engineering Consultancy City) was commissioned by the government of undivided Andhra Pradesh under then chief minister N. Chandrababu Naidu and inaugurated in November 1998 as the centrepiece of the wider Cyberabad development zone in the west of the city. It hosts the regional or national offices of major technology and financial firms including Microsoft, Google, Amazon, and Oracle alongside a growing base of start-ups, and is served by its own suburban railway and metro stations. Hyderabad's office stock has grown at the fastest rate of any major Indian city over the past two decades — a compound annual rate of about 9.2 percent — with prime rents rising from roughly INR 37 per square foot in 2012 to about INR 75 in 2025.

=== Kolkata ===
Kolkata's historic central business district is B.B.D. Bagh, formerly Dalhousie Square, laid out by the East India Company as a trading centre on the banks of the Hooghly River and later named after Lord Dalhousie; alongside Park Street, Camac Street, and Chowringhee, it remains the seat of the Government of West Bengal, centred on the colonial-era Writers' Building, and continues to be classified as the city's core CBD. Since the 1990s, however, much of the city's information-technology and financial-services growth has instead concentrated in the peripheral Salt Lake Sector-V and Rajarhat New Town corridor; Kolkata now has the most peripherally weighted office market of any major Indian city, with roughly 71 percent of its stock located outside the CBD and SBD zones altogether. Salt Lake Sector-V, a 170-hectare planned commercial sector of Salt Lake City developed for its proximity to Kolkata's airport, is now home to IT parks operated by Wipro, Godrej, and other major occupiers and is widely regarded as the IT hub of eastern India.

=== Other cities ===
Secondary business districts have also emerged around the older commercial cores of several other metropolises as office markets have expanded outward. In Chennai, the traditional CBD of Anna Salai (Mount Road), Nungambakkam, and T Nagar has been supplemented by suburban corridors around Guindy and Taramani and by the peripheral Old Mahabalipuram Road IT corridor beyond Perungudi, which together host the bulk of the city's technology and manufacturing-linked office demand. In Pune, commercial activity has migrated from the old Camp and Deccan Gymkhana core toward the Hinjewadi and Kharadi peripheral IT parks, which together account for roughly half of the city's total office stock. In Ahmedabad, the historic Ashram Road and Ellisbridge CBD has been overtaken by the SG Highway and Thaltej suburban corridor, while the under-development GIFT City financial centre in neighbouring Gandhinagar — India's first International Financial Services Centre — is emerging as the state of Gujarat's principal hub for banks, fintechs, and global institutions.

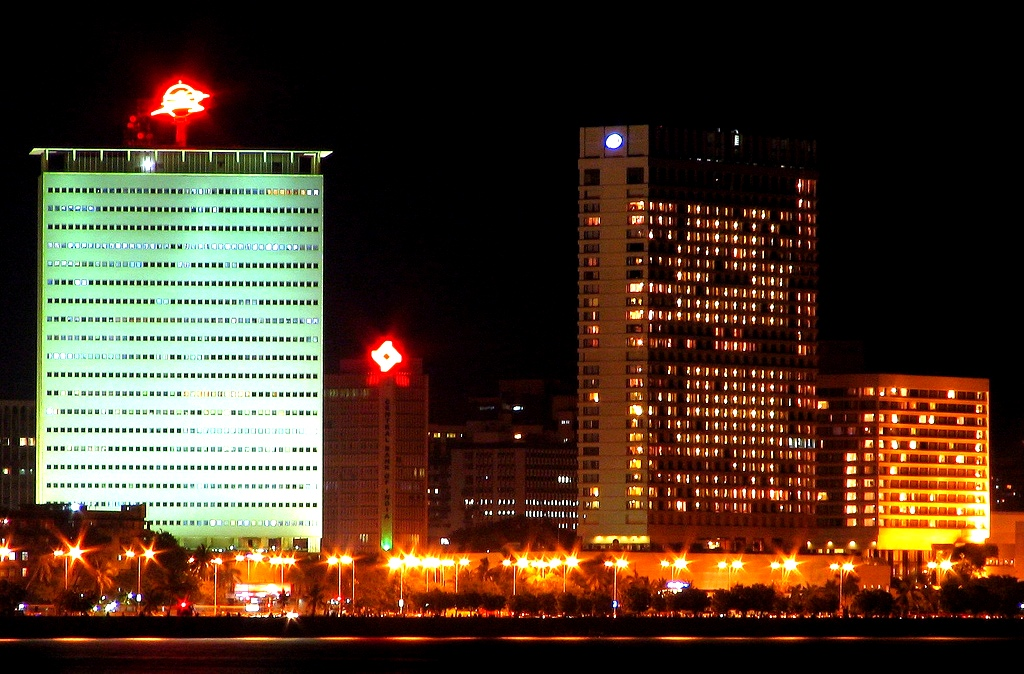
Skyline of Nariman Point, Mumbai, India's first central business district located in South Mumbai.

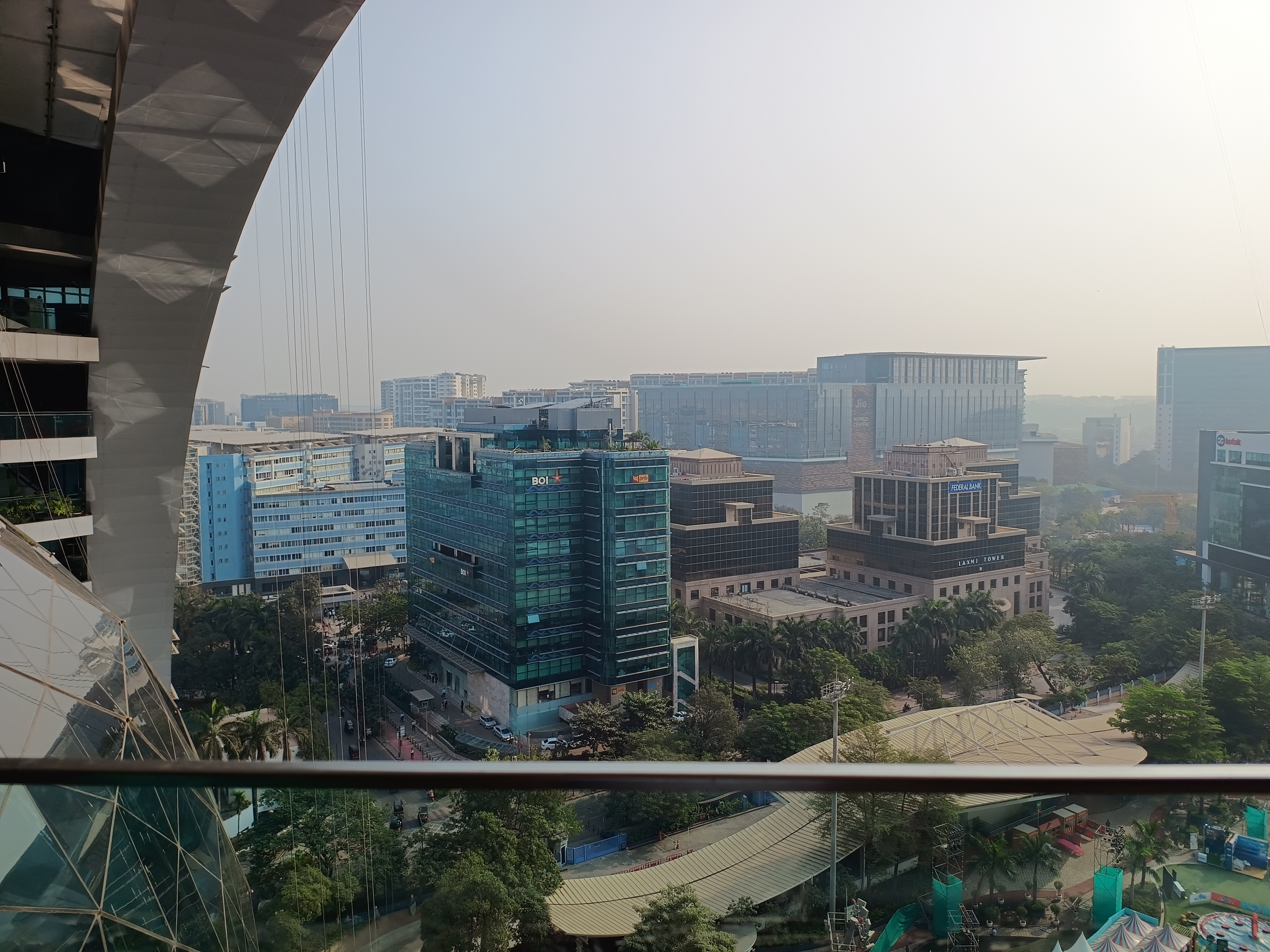
Bandra Kurla Complex, Mumbai's newer financial hub developed to relieve congestion in South Mumbai

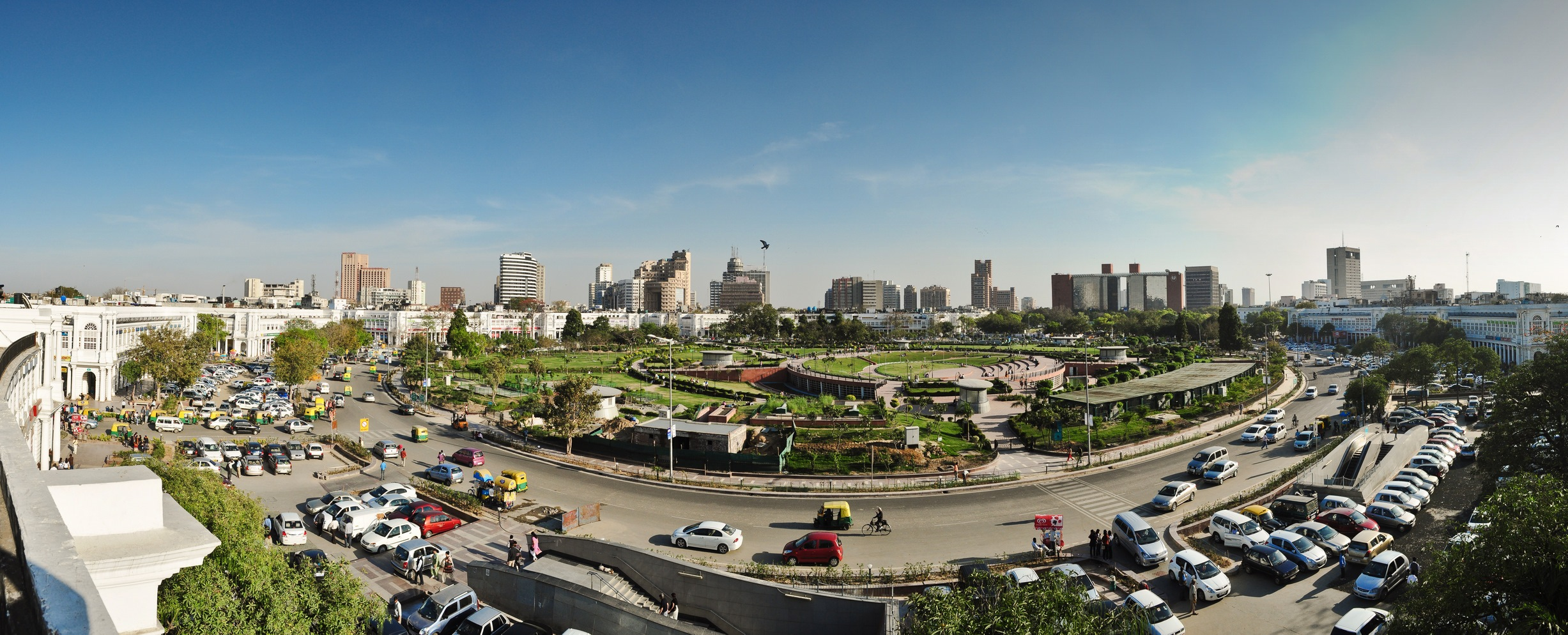
Skyline over Connaught Place (Rajiv Chowk), the historic central business district of New Delhi

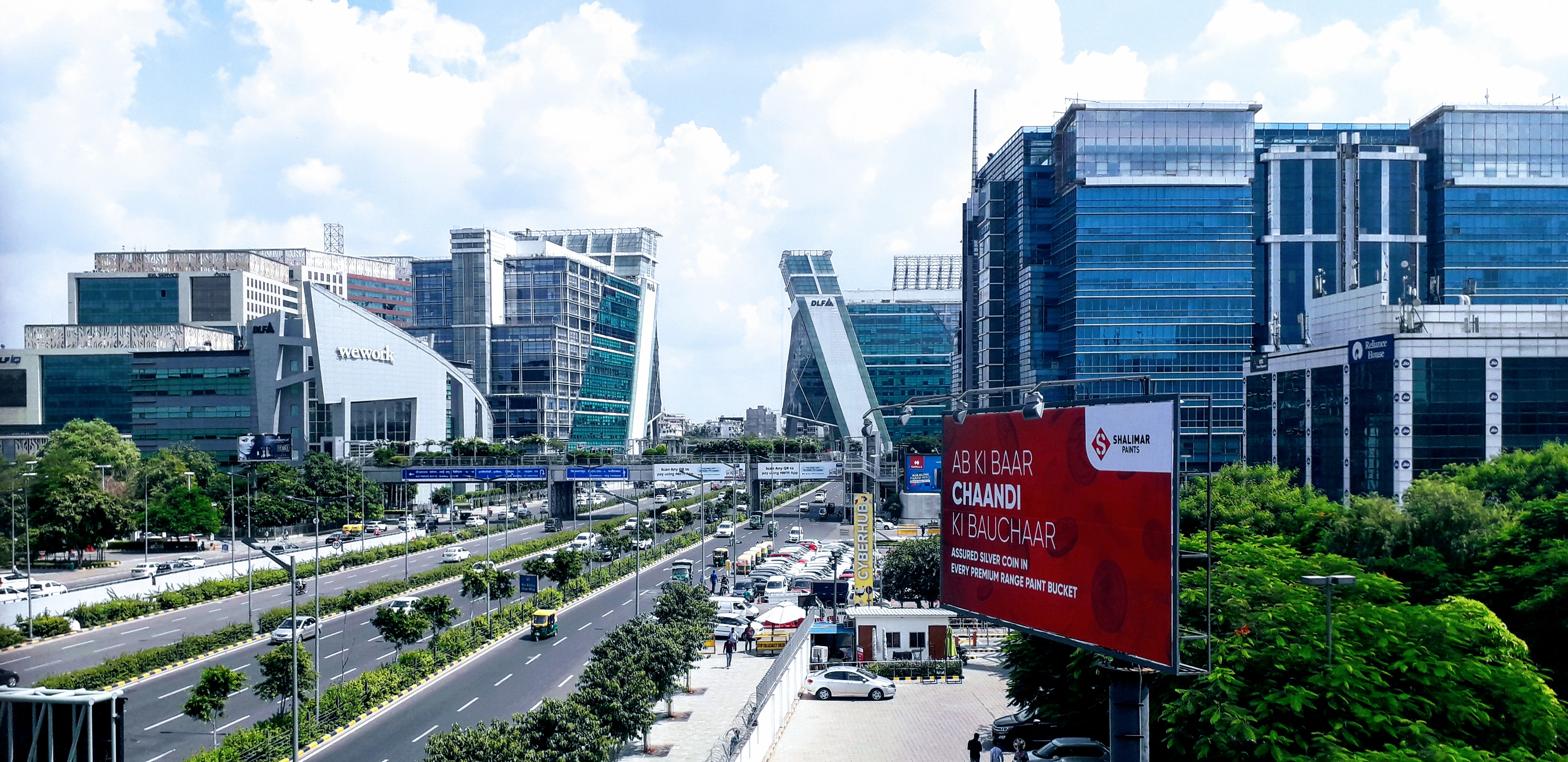
DLF Cyber City, Gurugram, in the Delhi National Capital Region

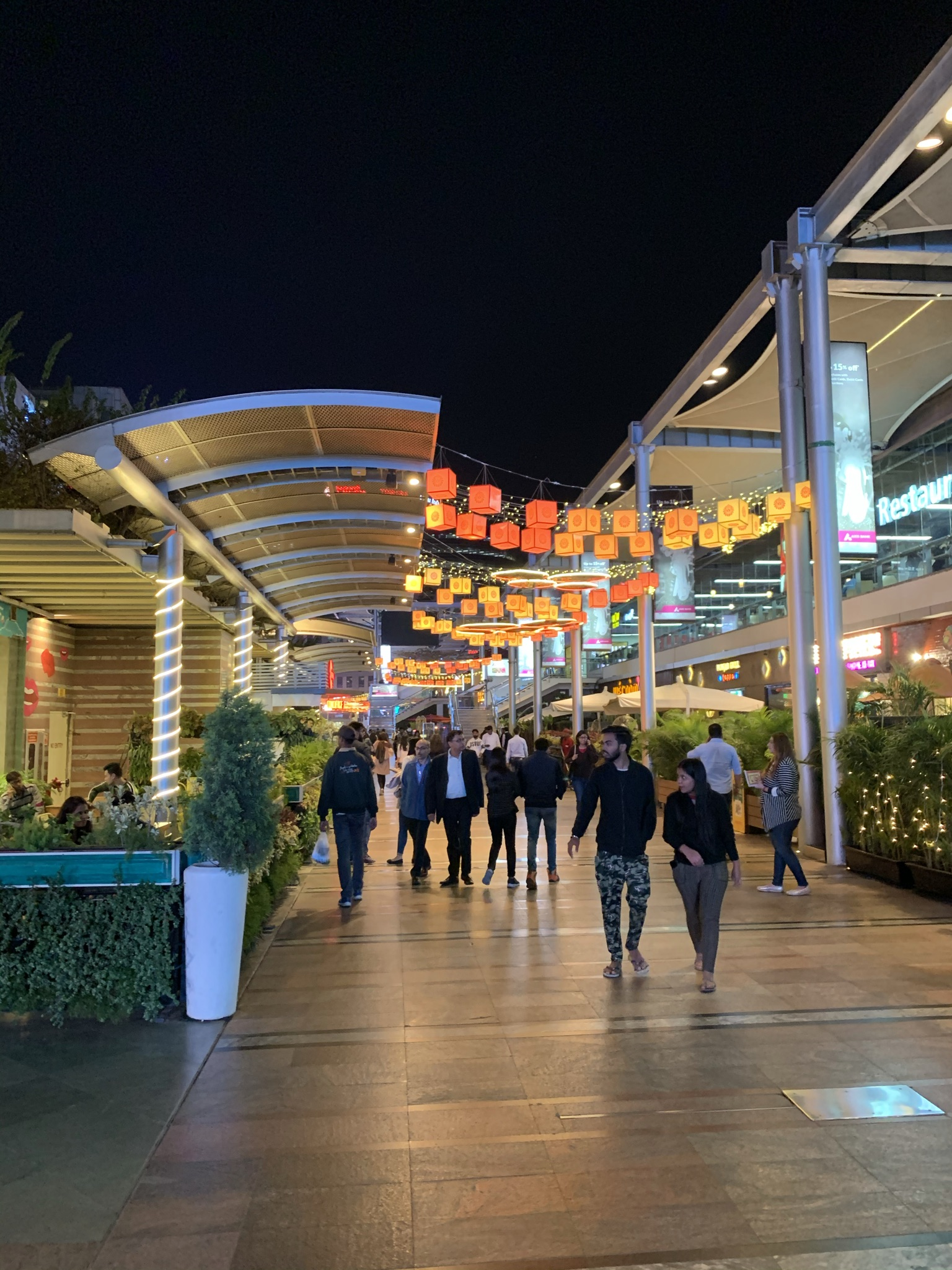
DLF Cyber Hub, the dining and entertainment precinct of Cyber City Gurgaon

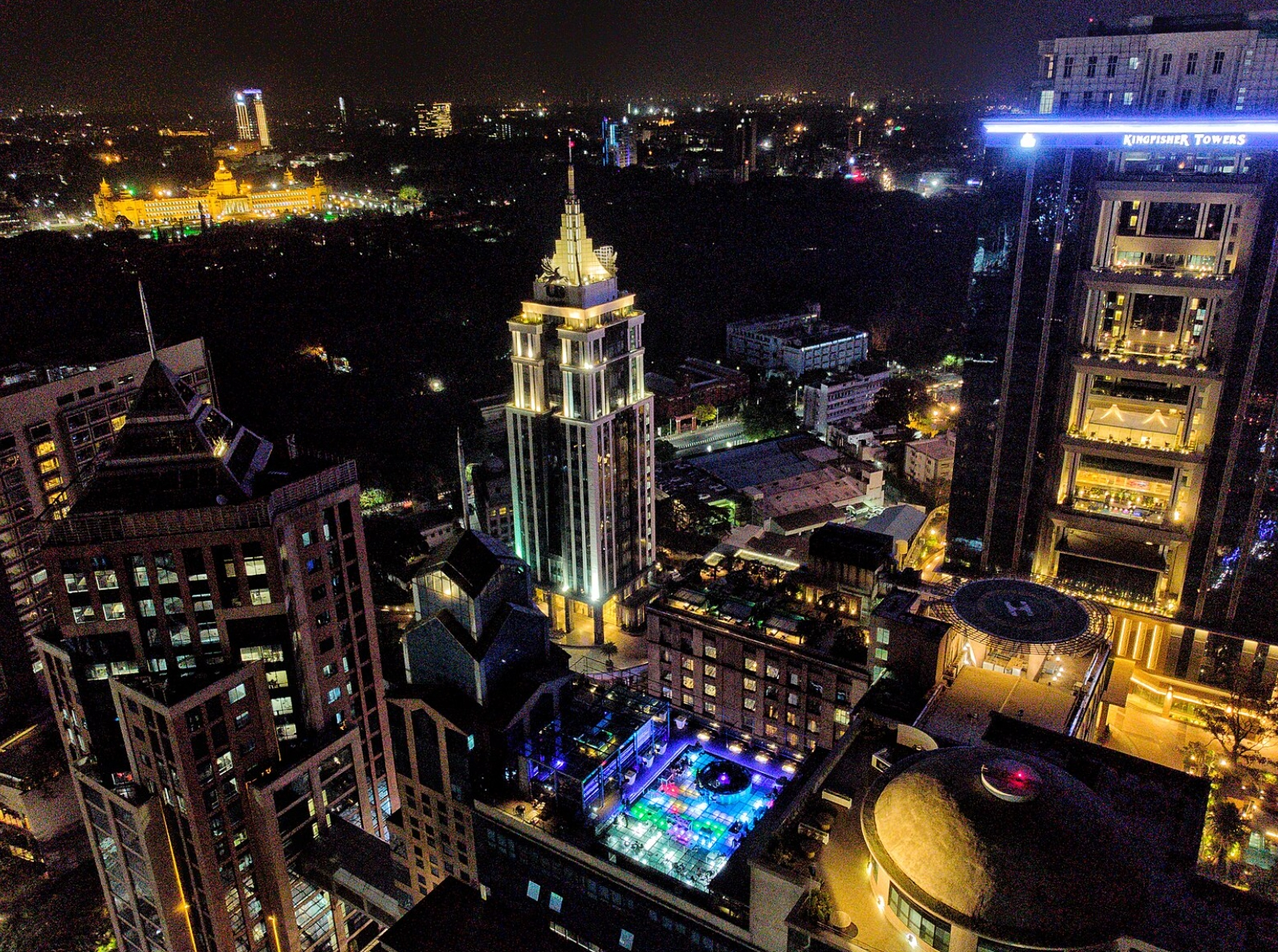
Skyline of UB City, anchor of the Bengaluru Central Business District

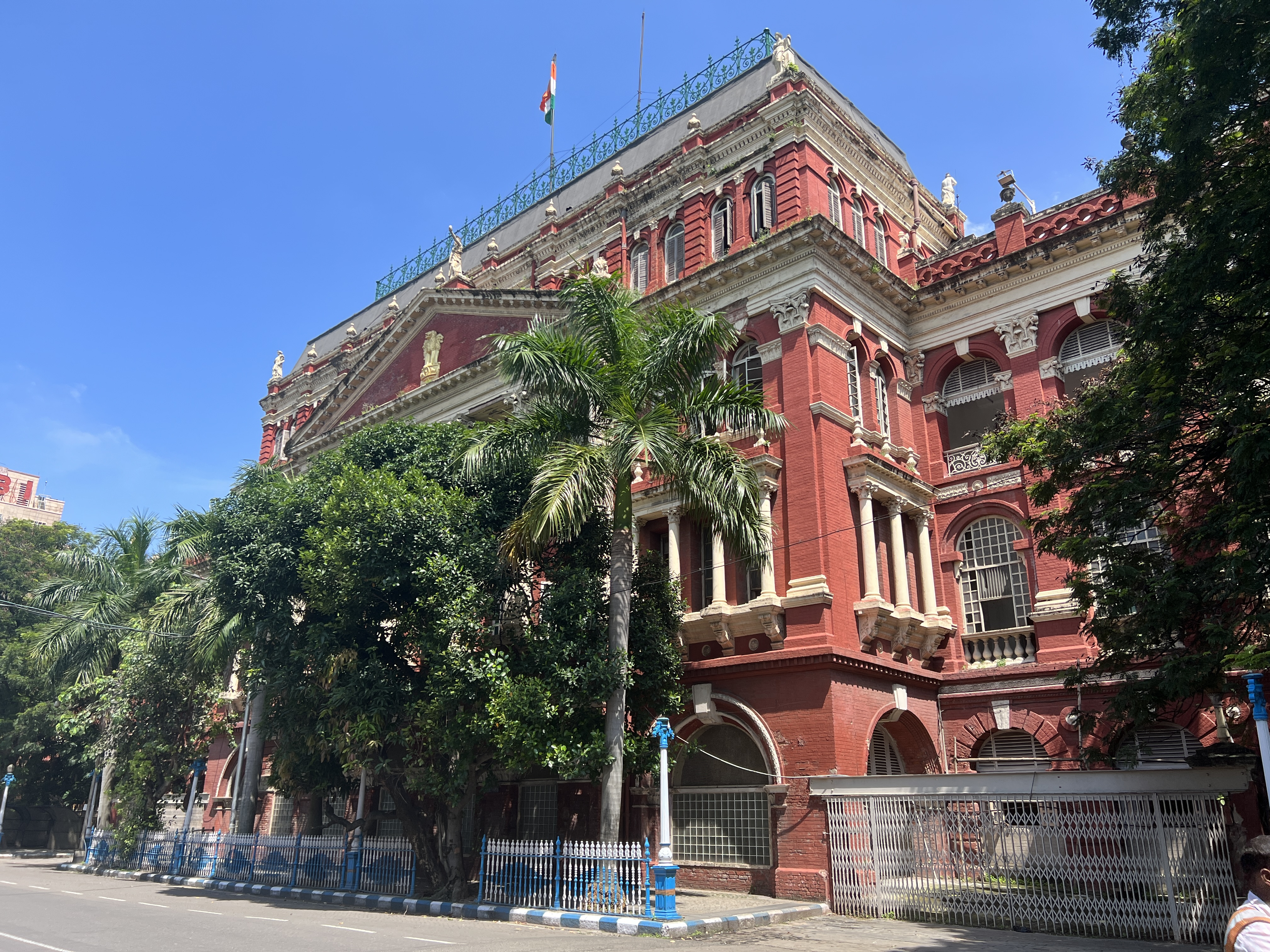
The Writers' Building in B.B.D. Bagh, Kolkata's historic central business district

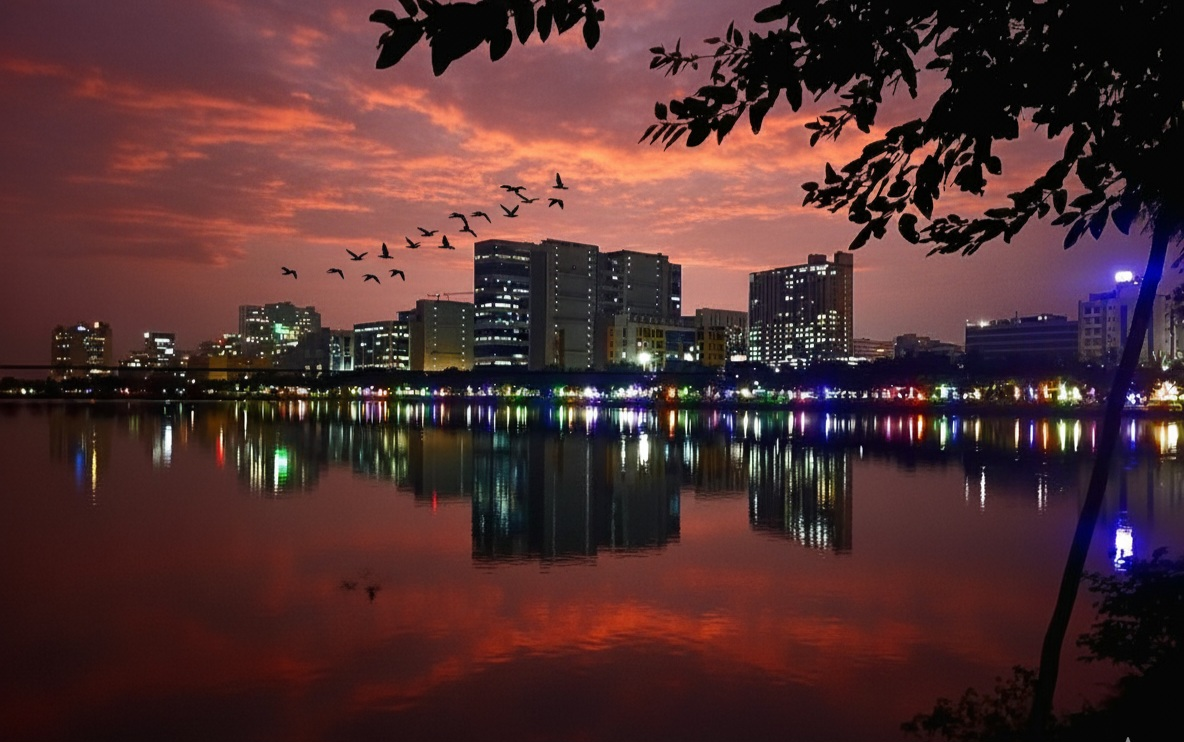
Salt Lake Sector-V, Kolkata's modern IT and financial hub

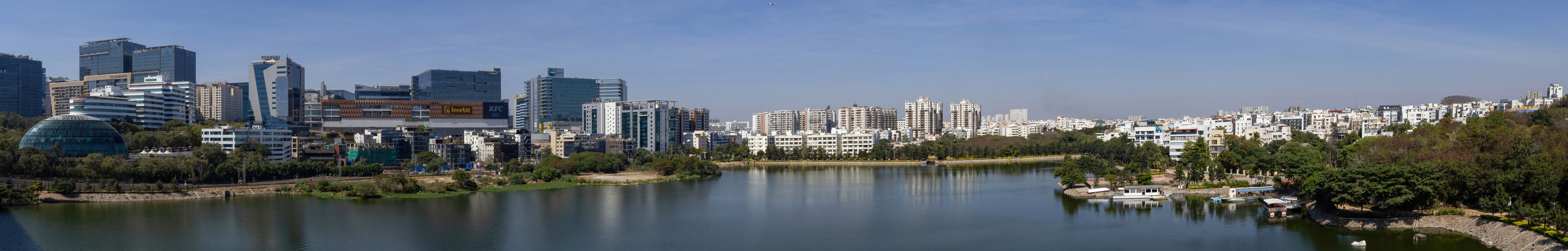
Durgam Cheruvu lake, bordering HITEC City, Hyderabad's information-technology and business district

== Indonesia ==
The largest CBD in Indonesia is the Golden Triangle (Segitiga Emas in Indonesian) in Jakarta. Sudirman Central Business District, a super block that is located within the Golden Triangle, is the first of its kind in Indonesia, and one of the largest commercial center developments in the city. Jakarta started developing its business district in the early 1960s before hosting the Asian Games in 1962.

Surabaya in East Java built its first central business district in the Darmo region. The construction was expected to be completed by 2018 with 150 SOHO units and 500 residences.

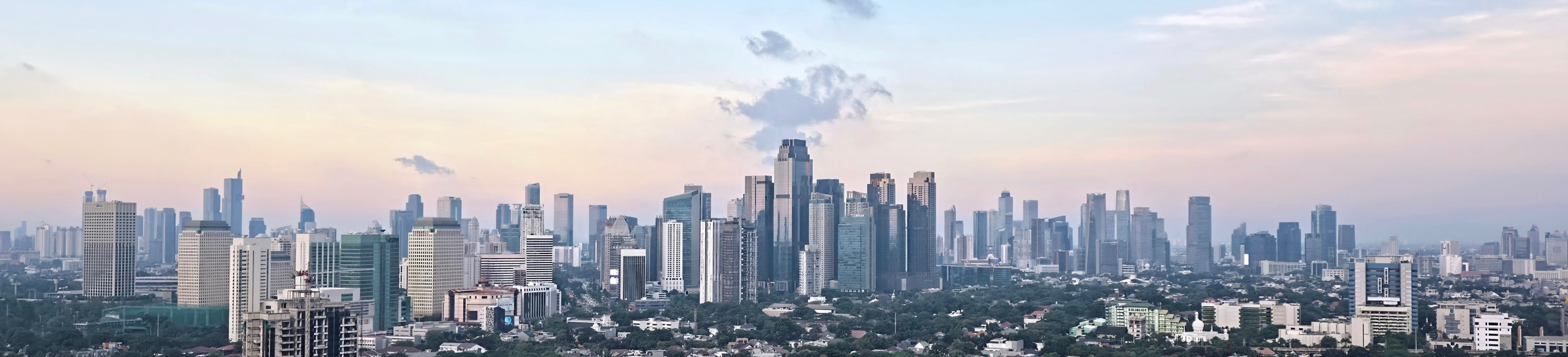
Jakarta CBD seen from south Jakarta

== Italy ==
In Italy, business districts generally do not coincide with the geographical centers of cities, as city centres are typically located within the historic core and are therefore often not well suited to accommodate modern business districts.

One of the earliest examples of a modern business district in Italy is EUR in Rome, which has since developed into an important business and institutional centre, hosting numerous national and international companies as well as public institutions.

Today, EUR, the Naples business district, the Milan business district, and CityLife are among the most prominent business districts and commercial centres in Italy. Other significant business and financial centres include Brescia Due in Brescia, San Benigno in Genoa, and the business district of Reggio Calabria.

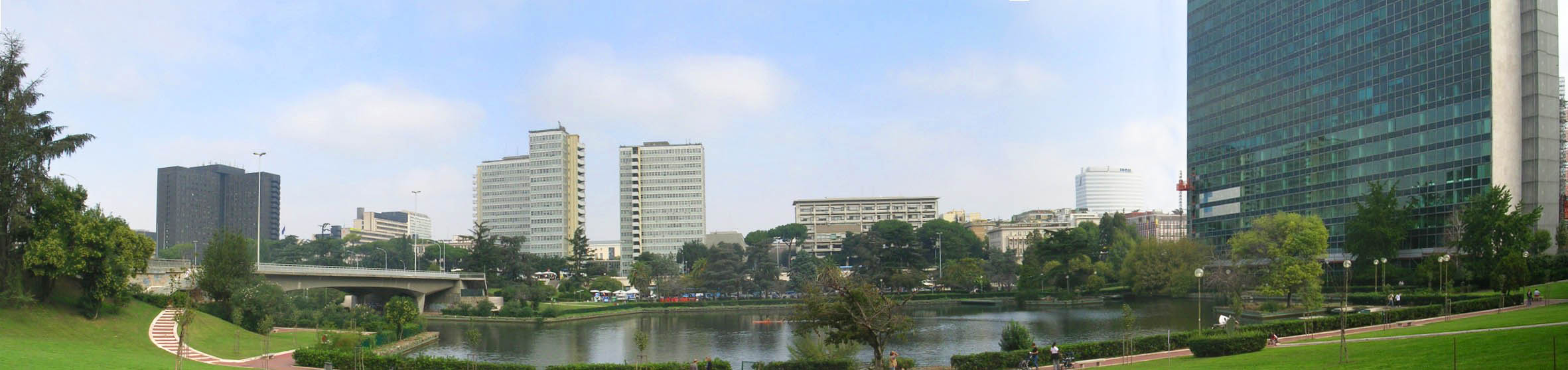
EUR, Rome

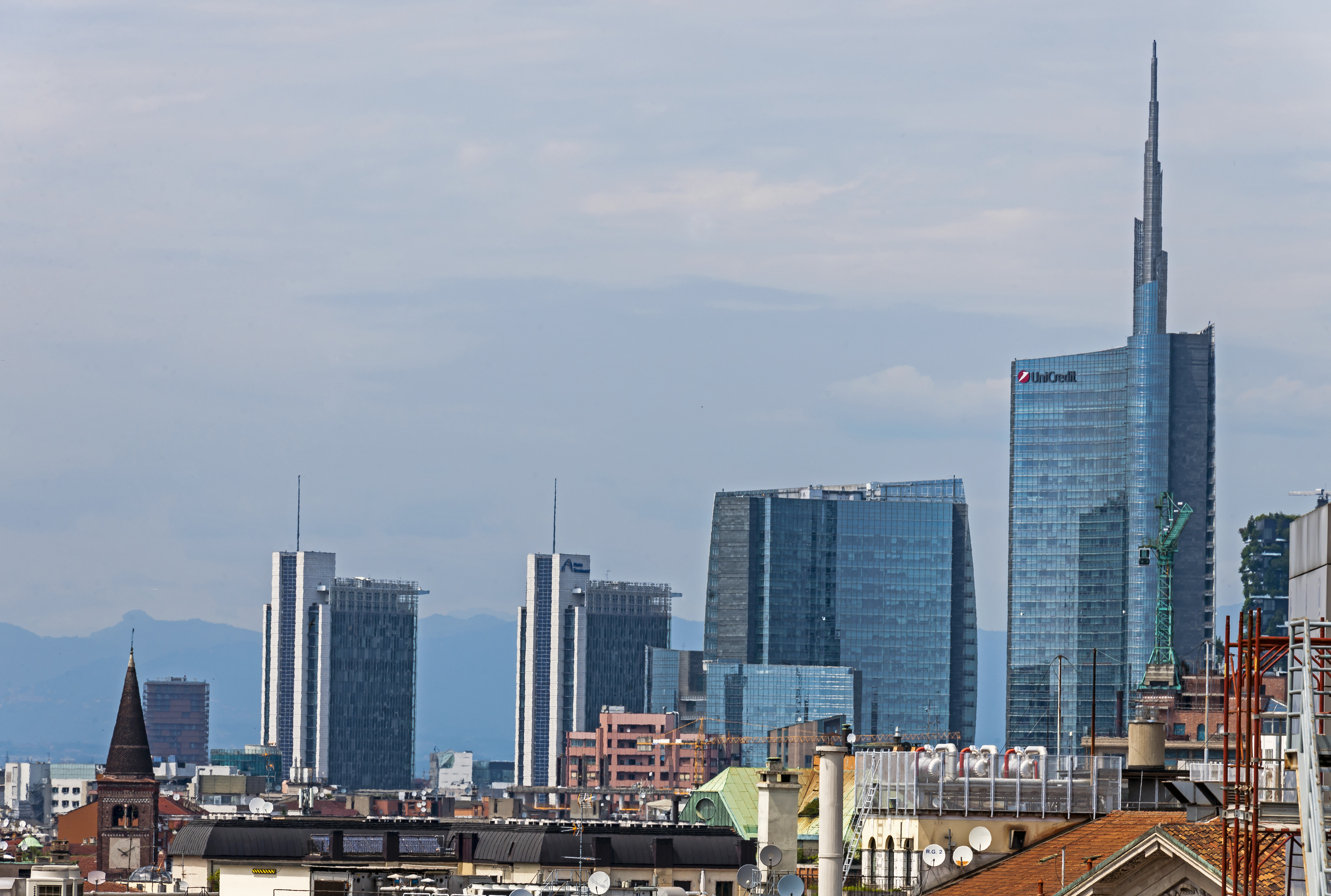
Centro Direzionale di Milano, Milan

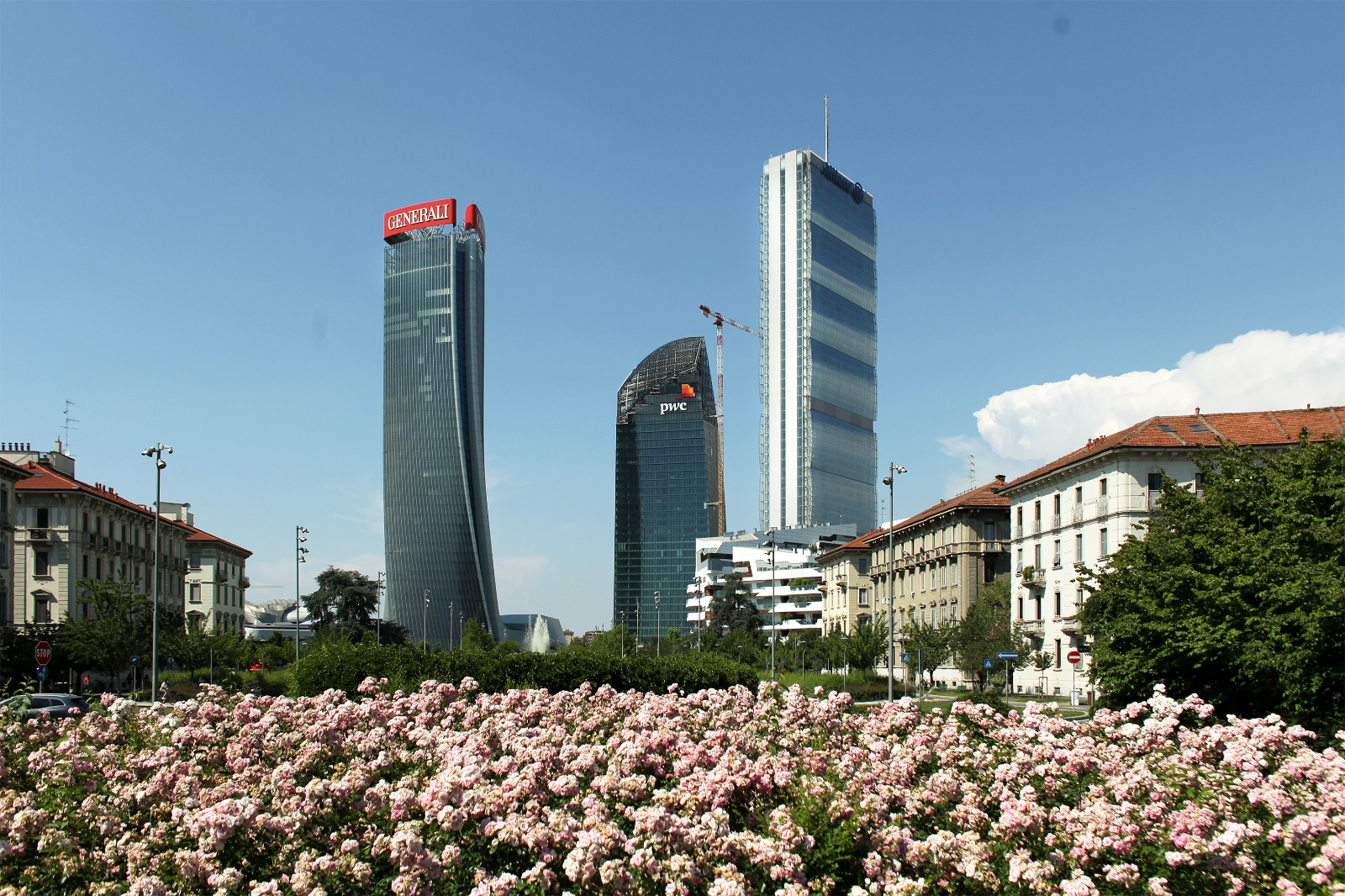
CityLife, Milan

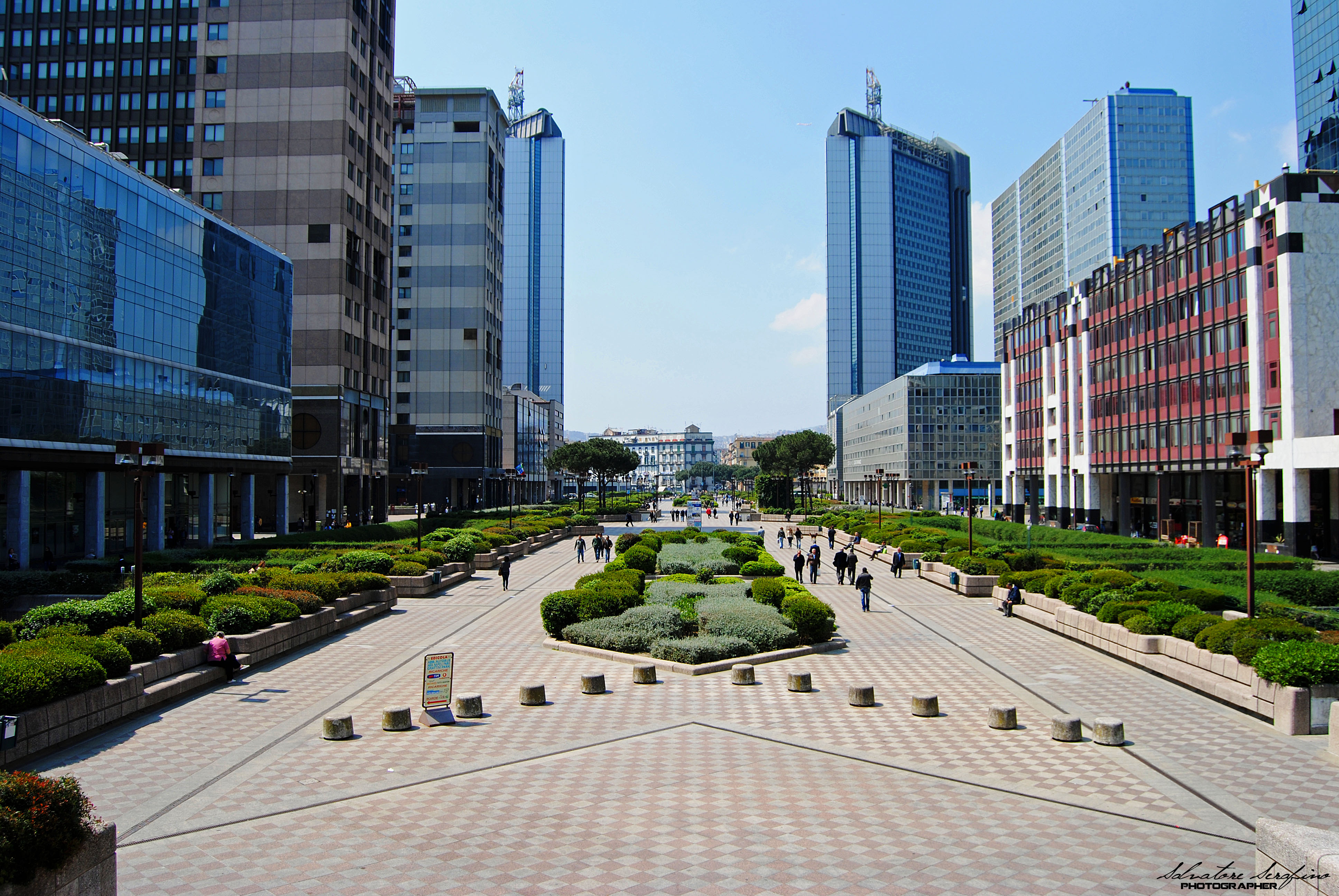
Centro Direzionale di Napoli, Naples

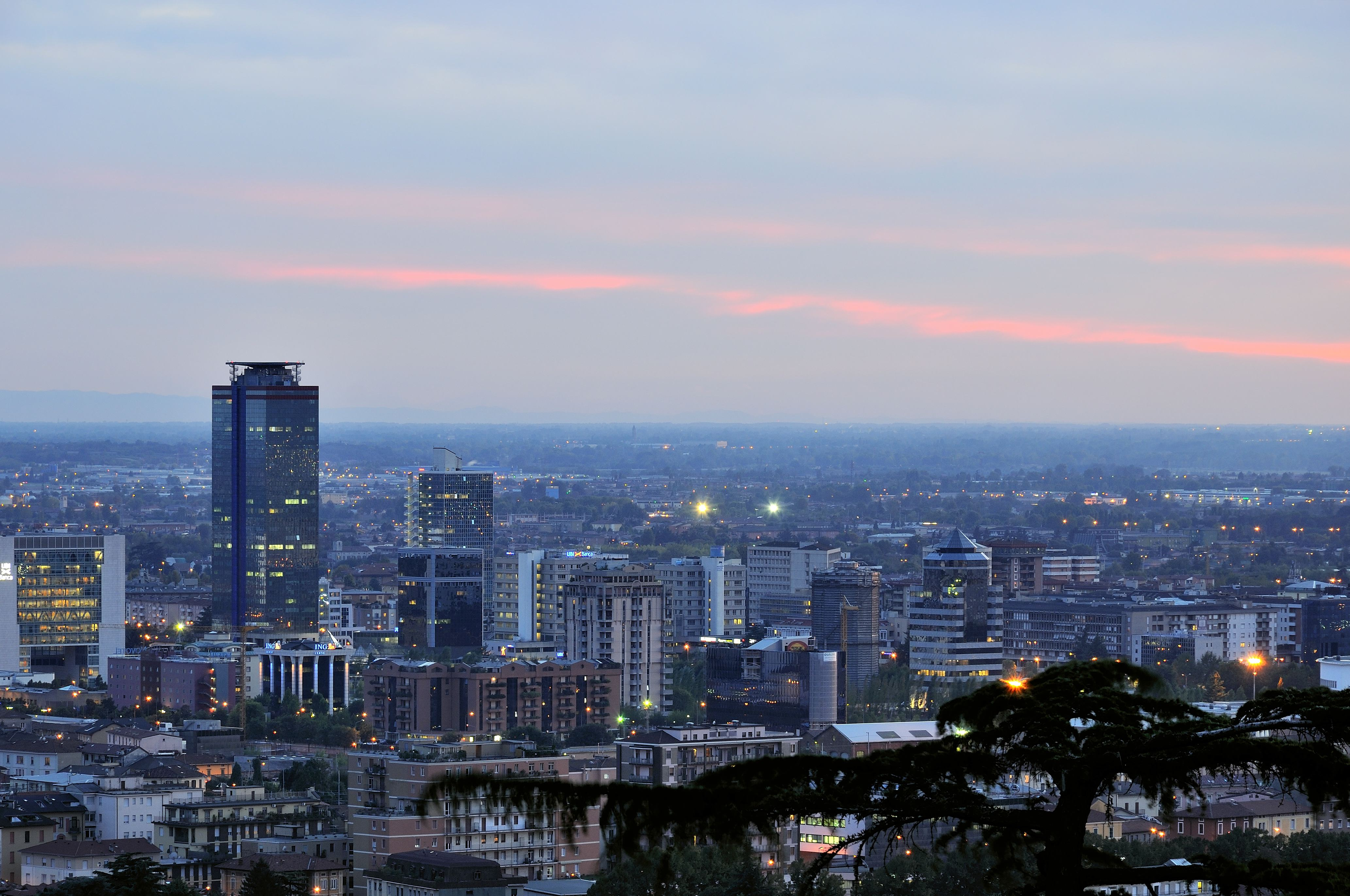
Brescia Due, Brescia

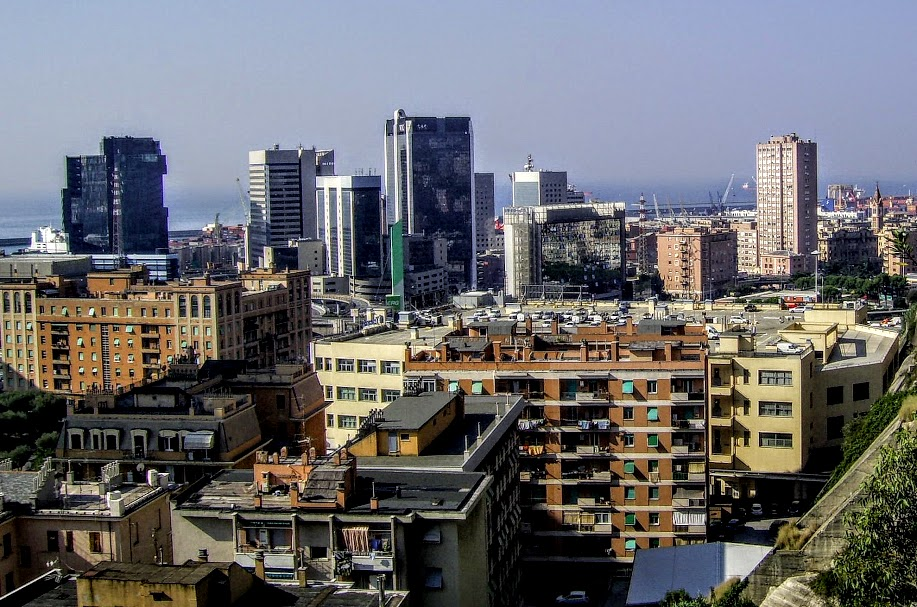
Centro Direzionale di San Benigno, Genoa

== Japan ==
- Fukuoka (Chūō-ku, Fukuoka)
- Hiroshima (Naka-ku, Hiroshima)
- Kobe (Chūō-ku, Kobe)
- Kyoto (Nakagyō-ku, Kyoto)
- Nagoya (Naka-ku, Nagoya, Nakamura-ku, Nagoya)
- Osaka (Chūō-ku, Osaka, Kita-ku, Osaka)
- Sapporo (Chūō-ku, Sapporo)
- Sendai (Aoba-ku, Sendai)
- Tokyo (Special wards of Tokyo)
- Yokohama (Naka-ku, Yokohama)
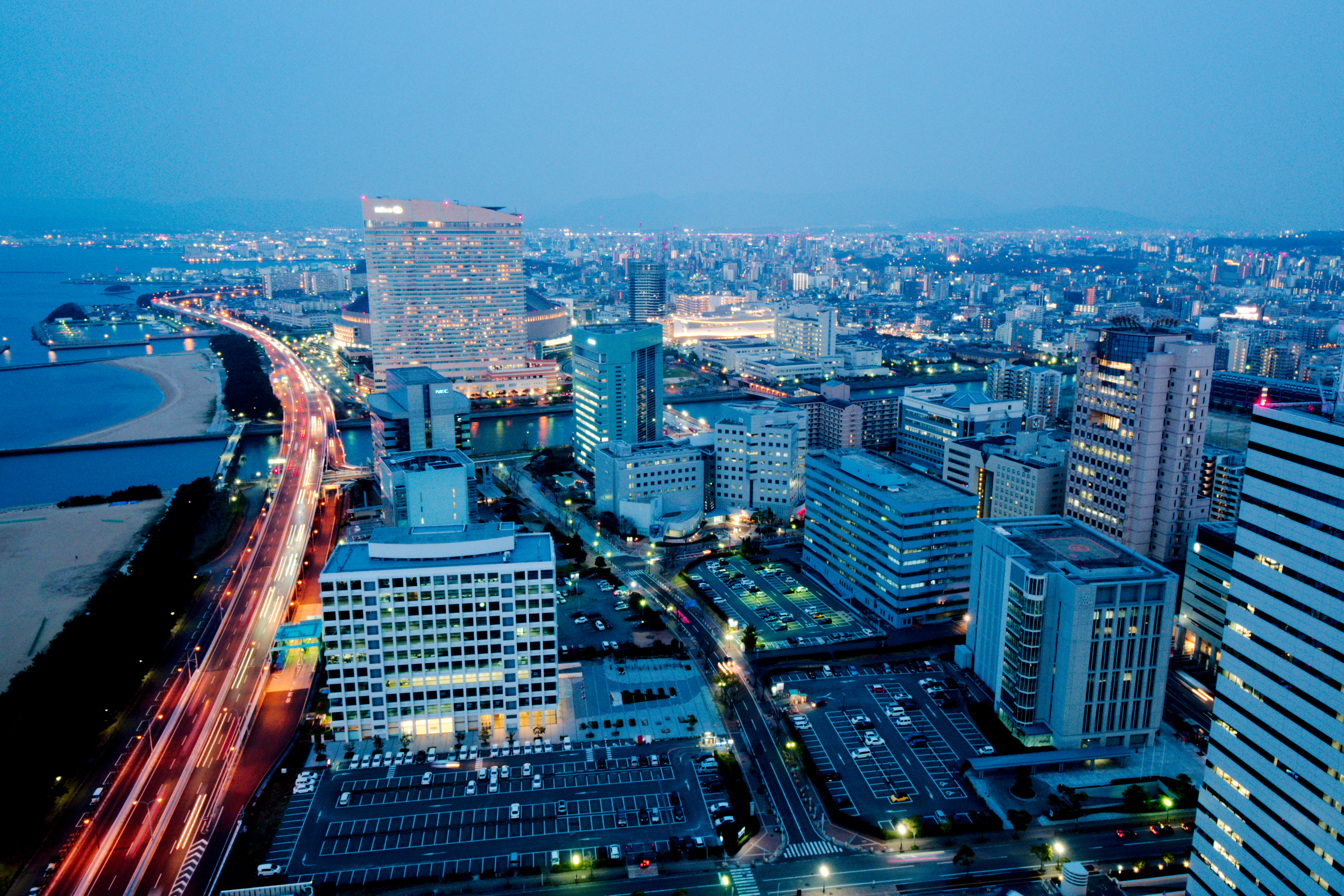
Fukuoka (Tenjin)

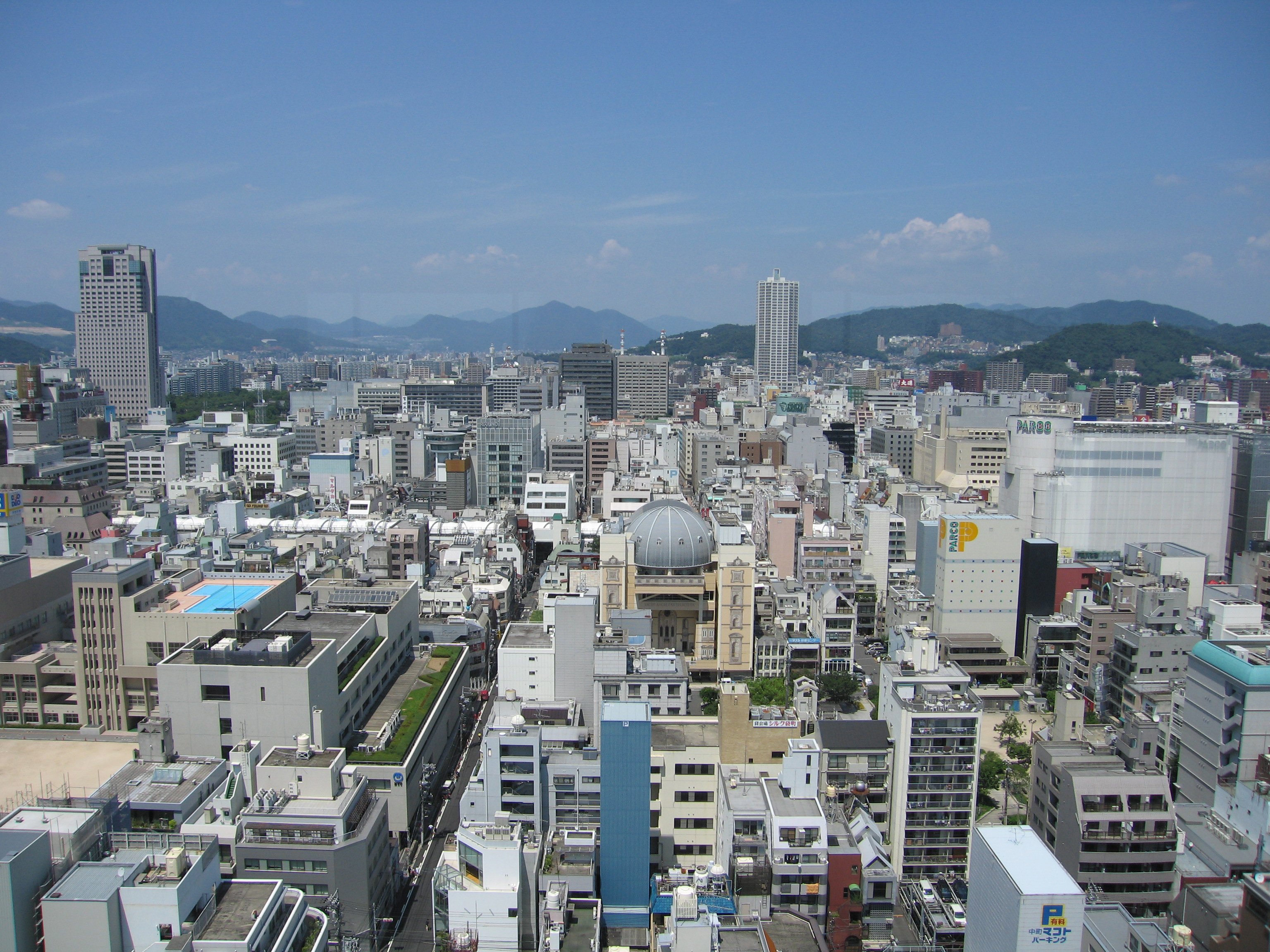
Hiroshima (Hondōri)

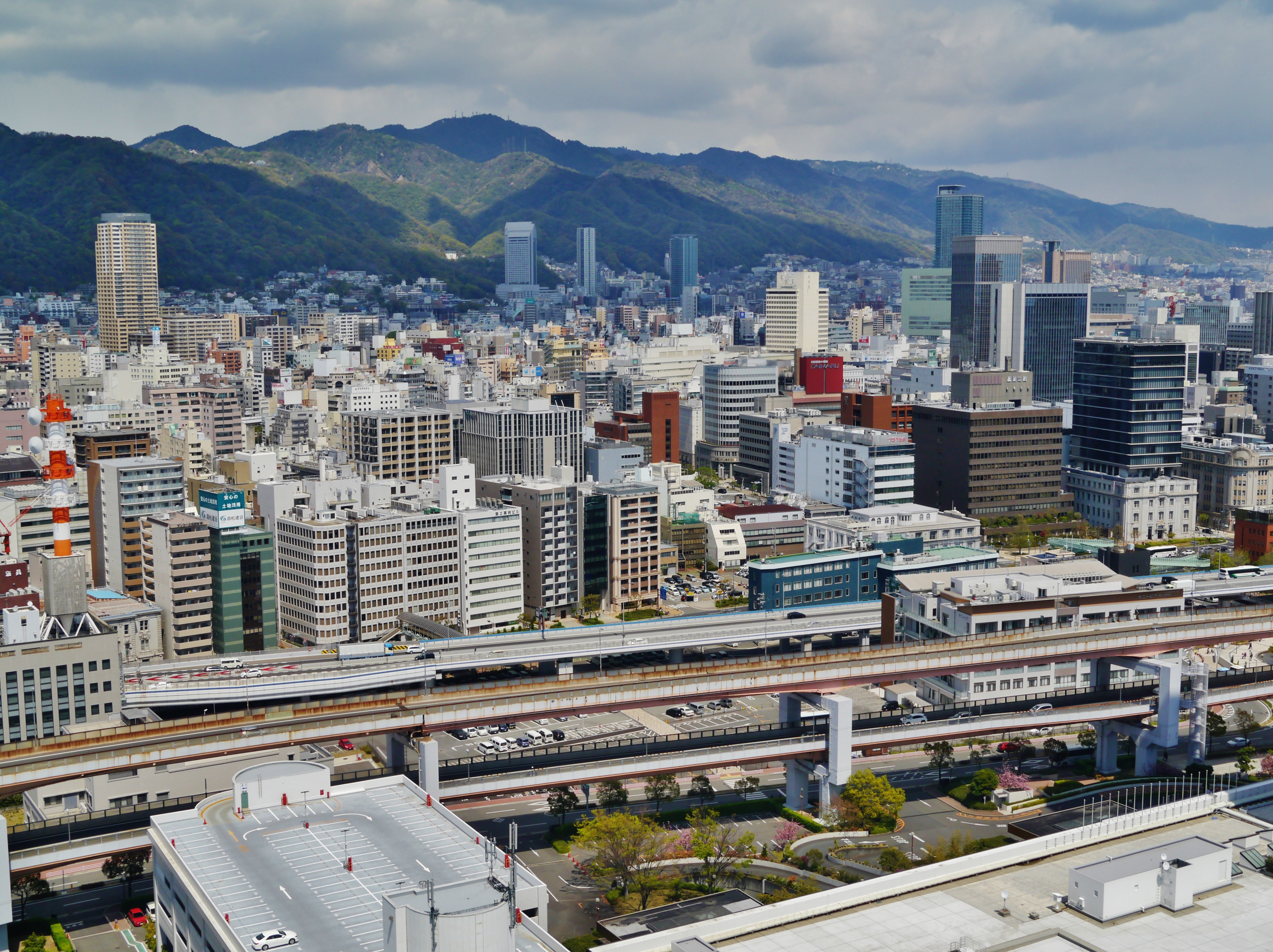
Kobe (Sannomiya)

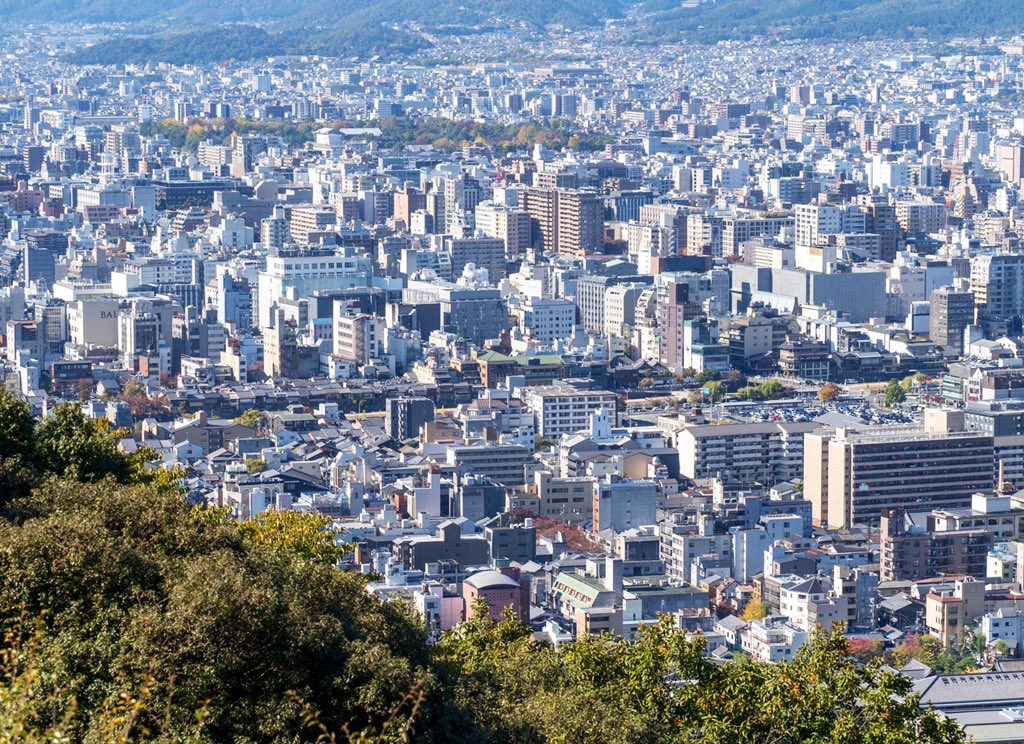
Kyoto (Nakagyō-ku)

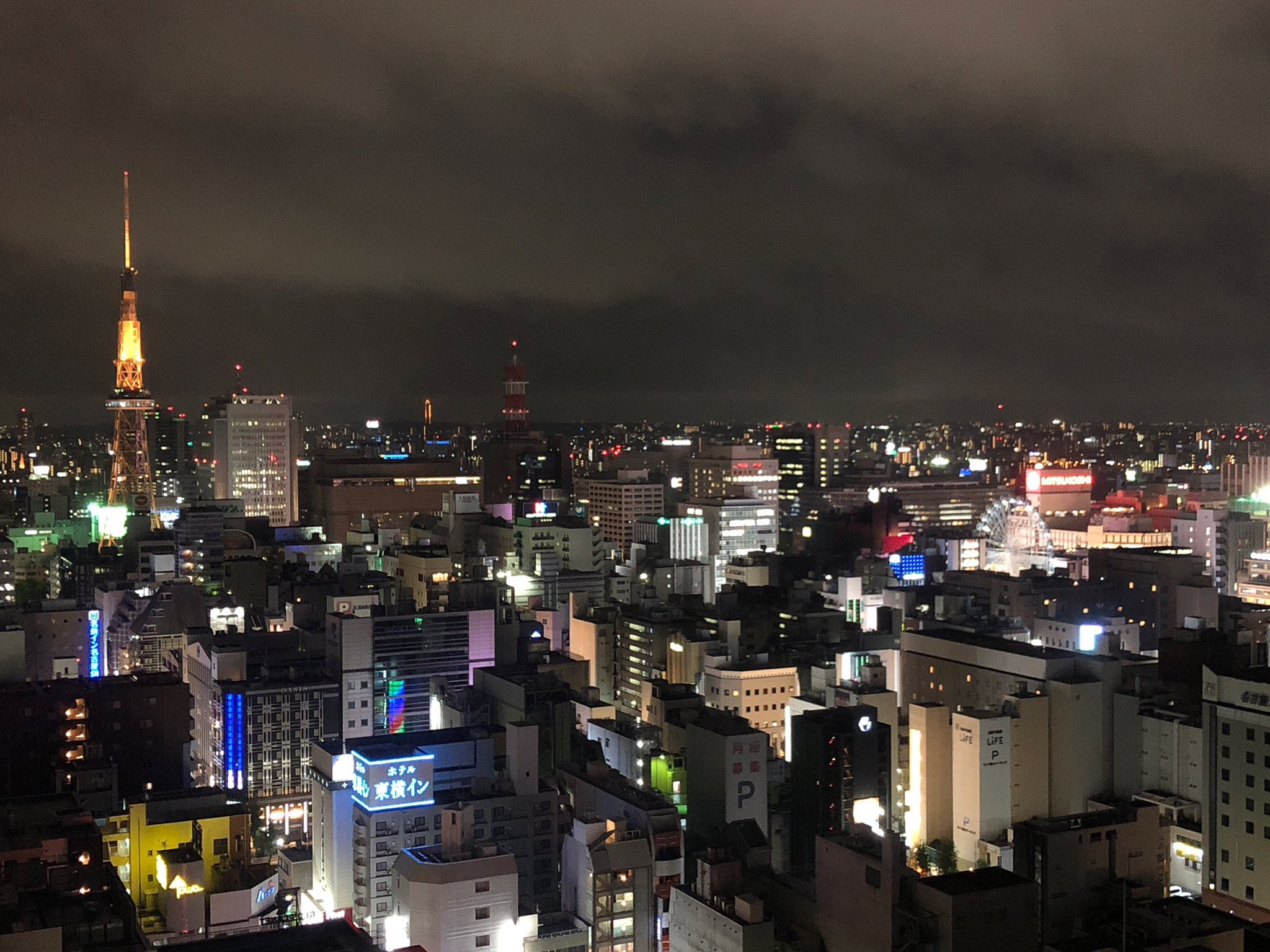
Nagoya (Sakae)

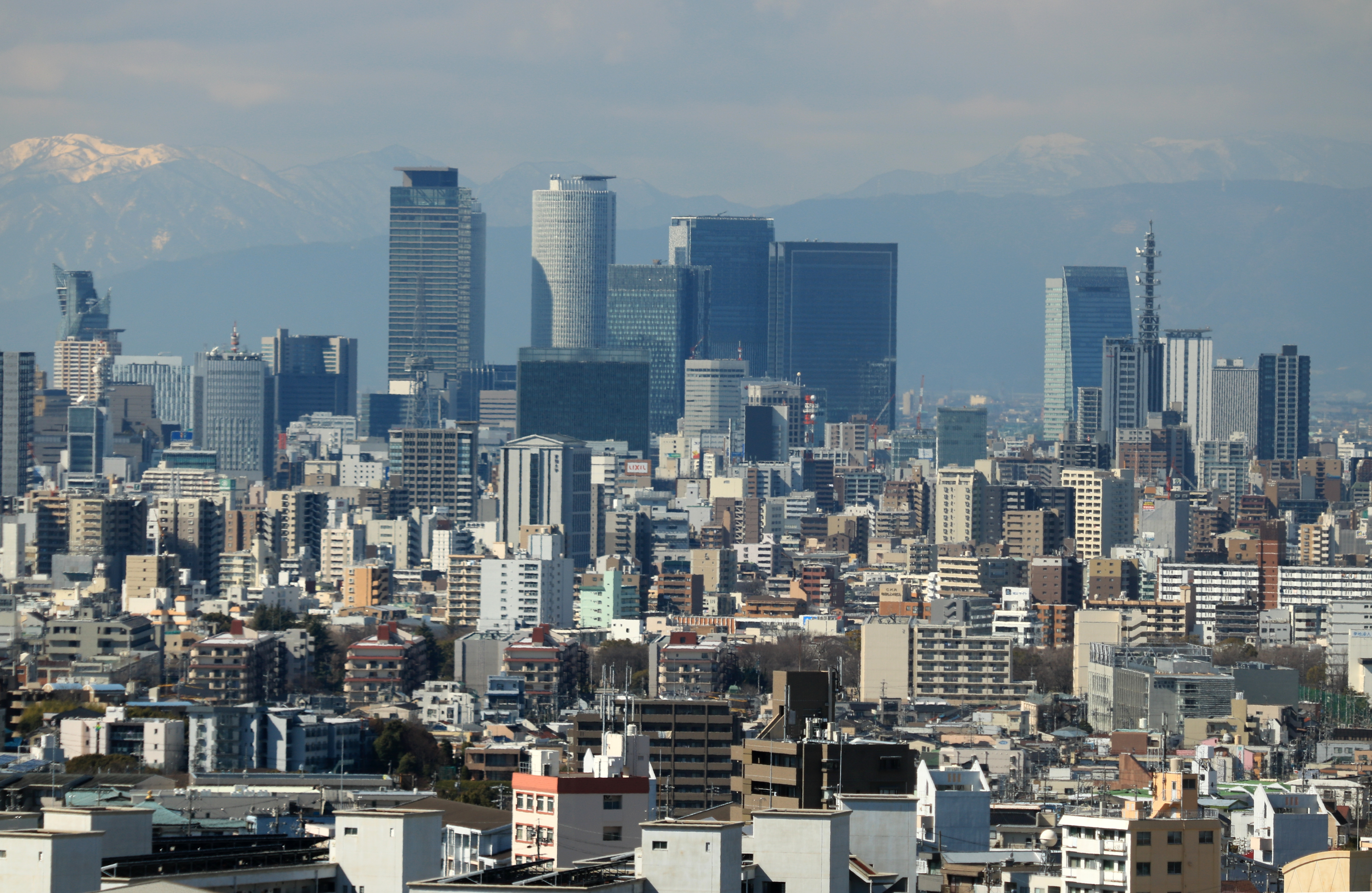
Nagoya (Meieki)

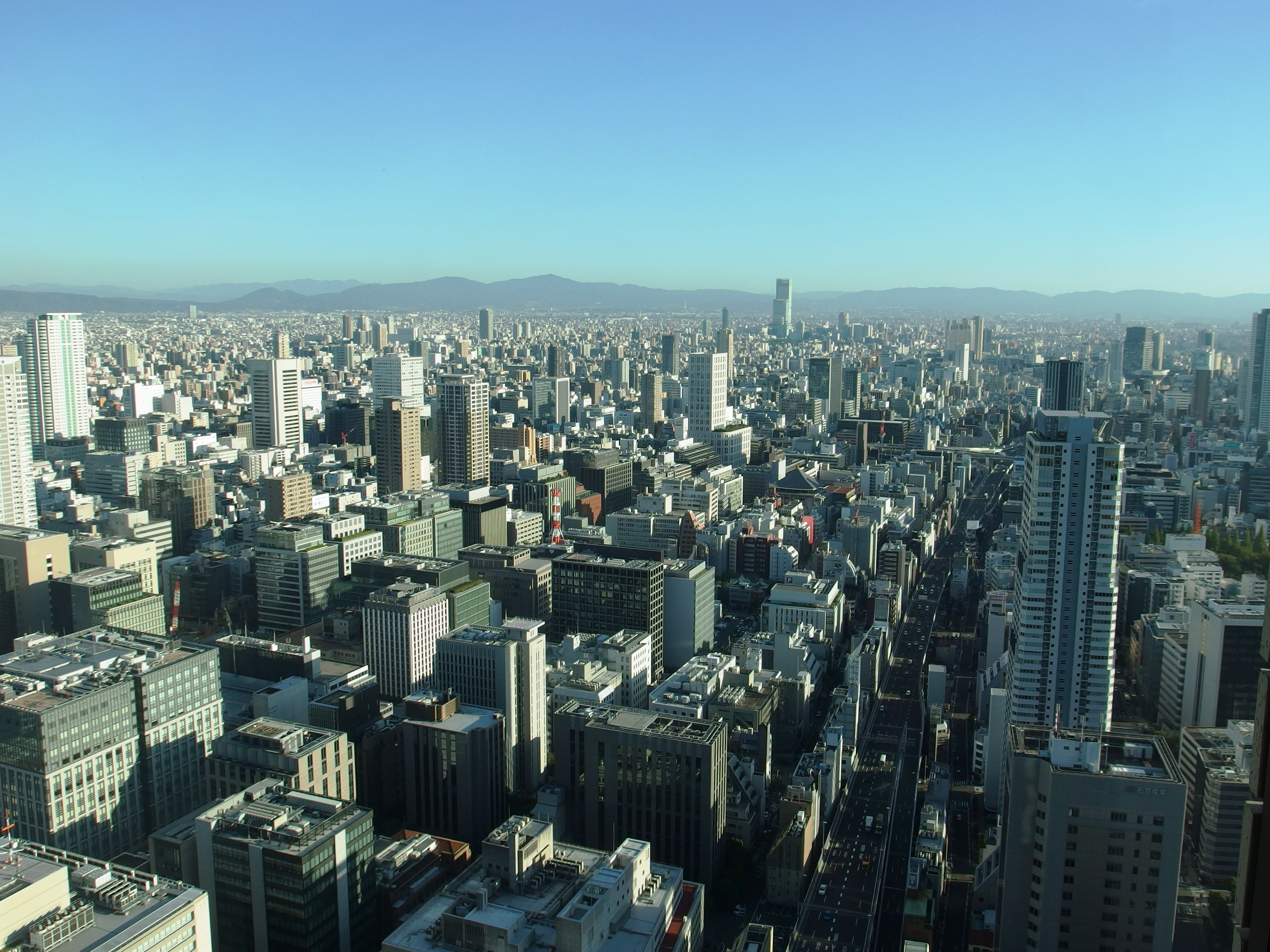
Osaka (Hommachi)

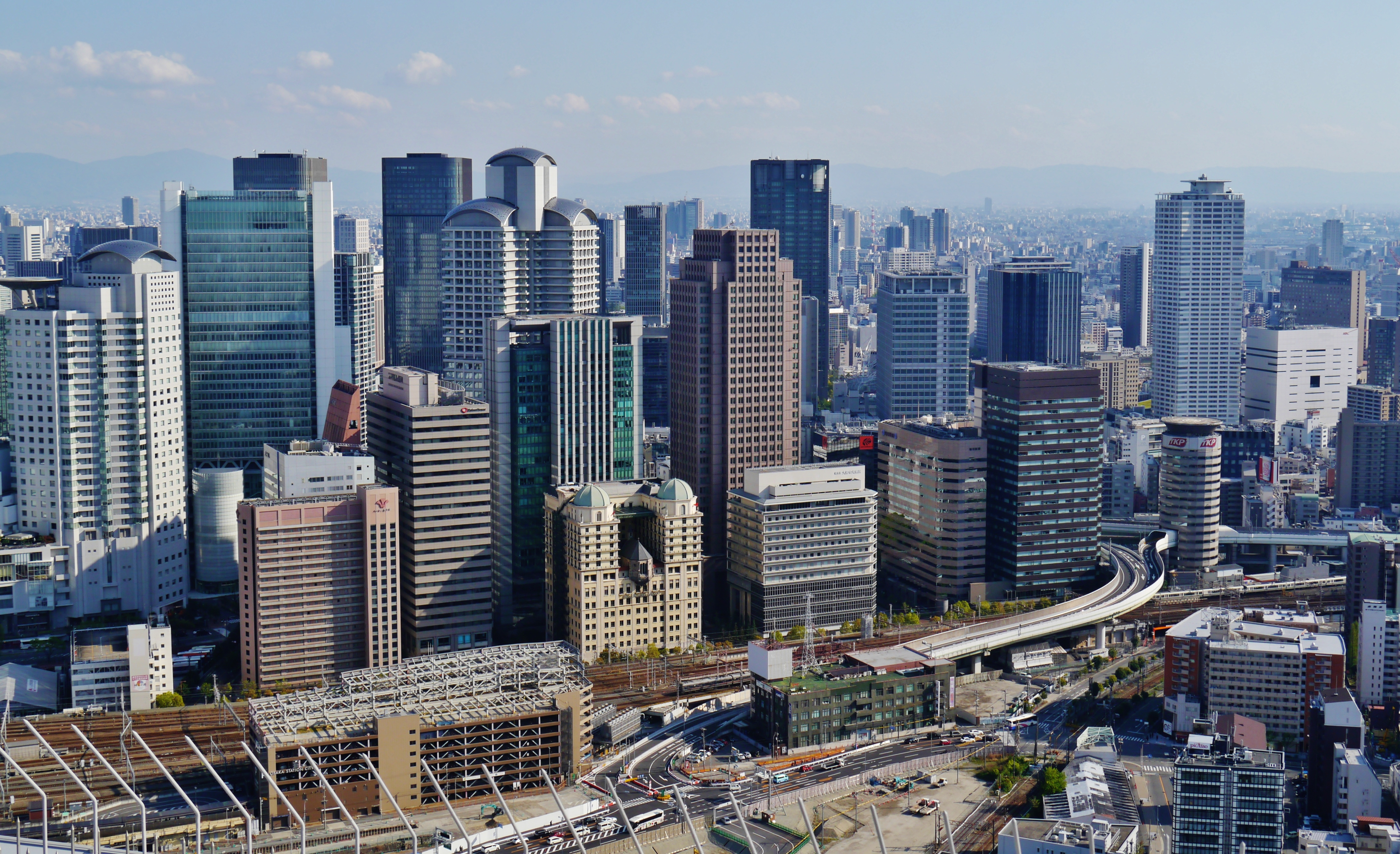
Osaka (Umeda)

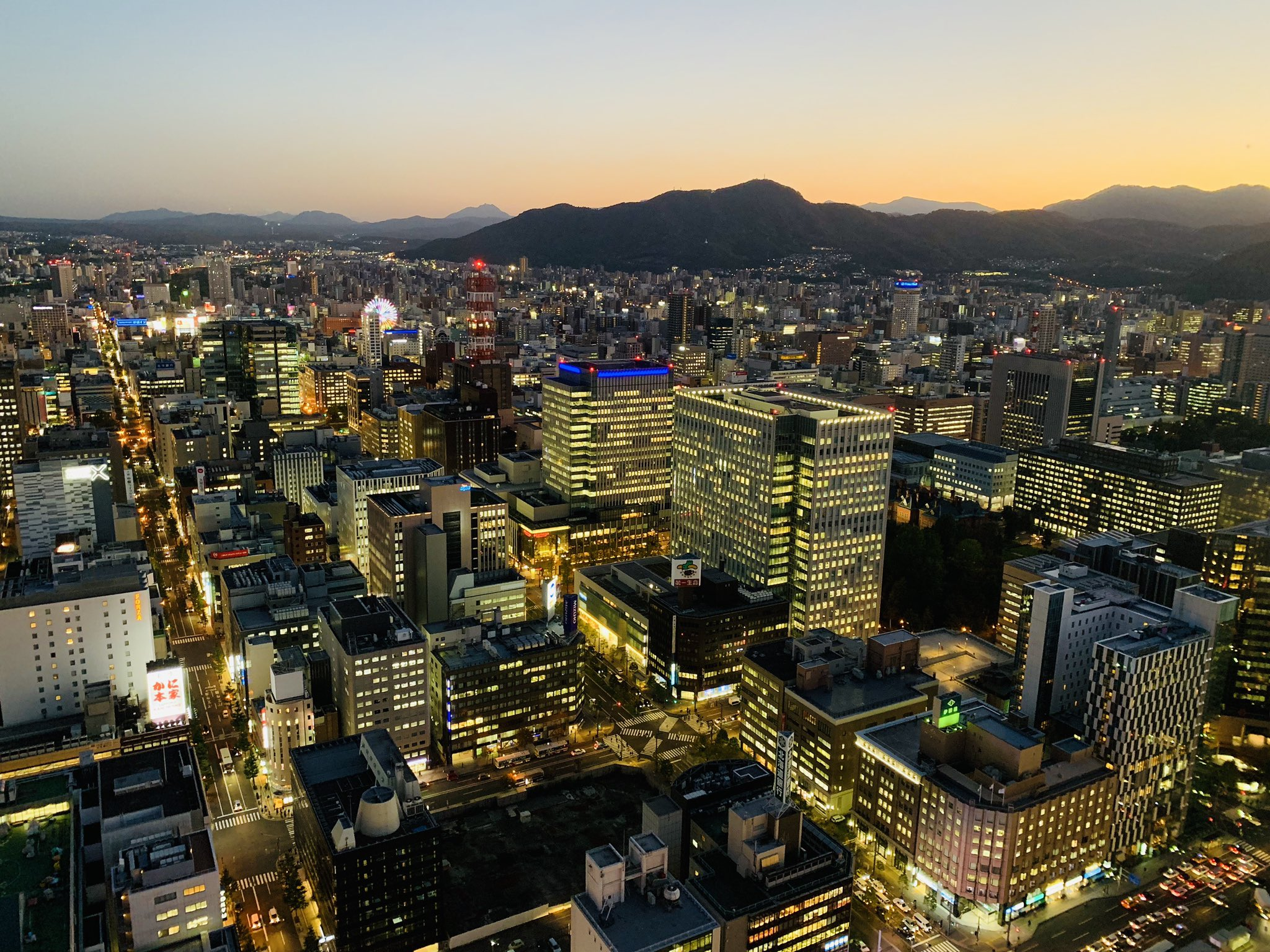
Sapporo (Ōdōri)

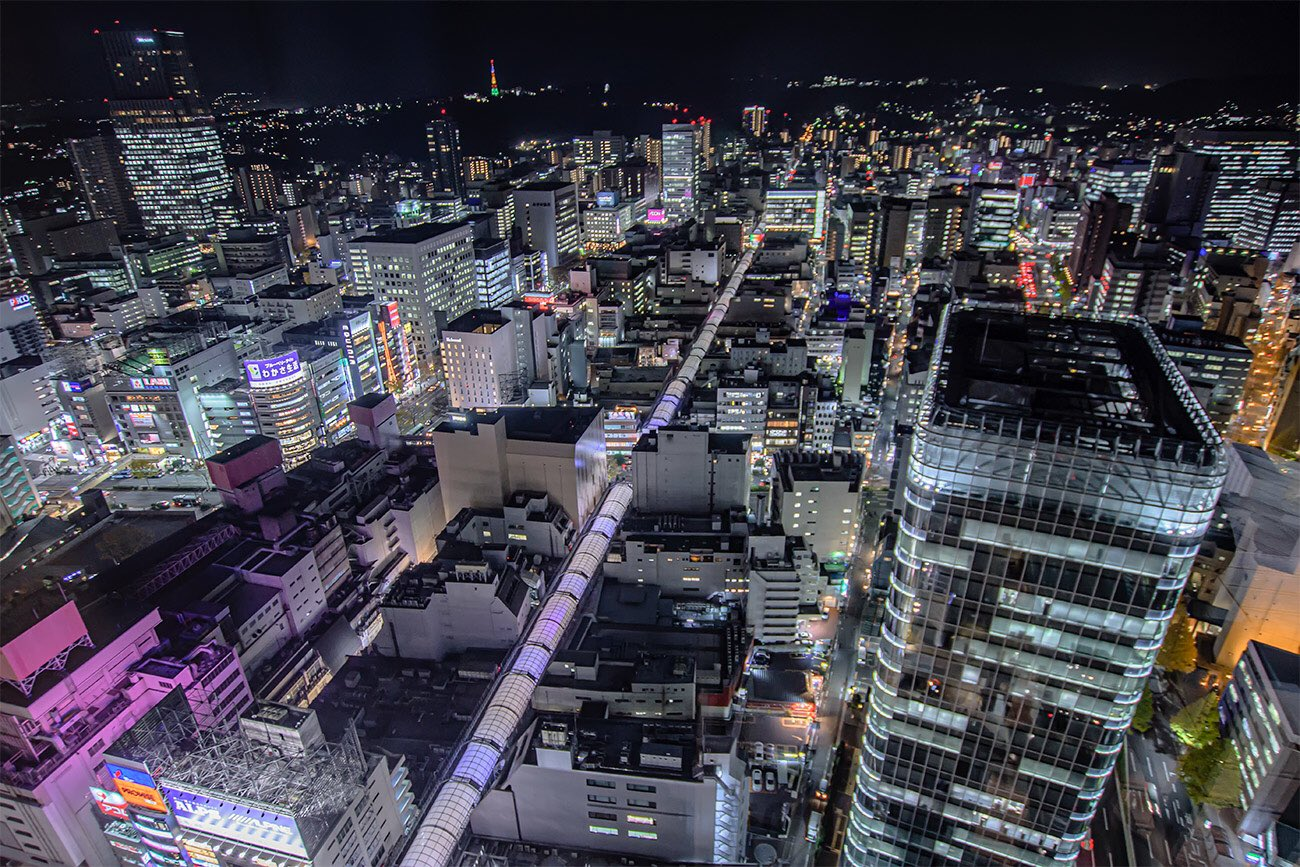
Sendai (Ichibanchō)

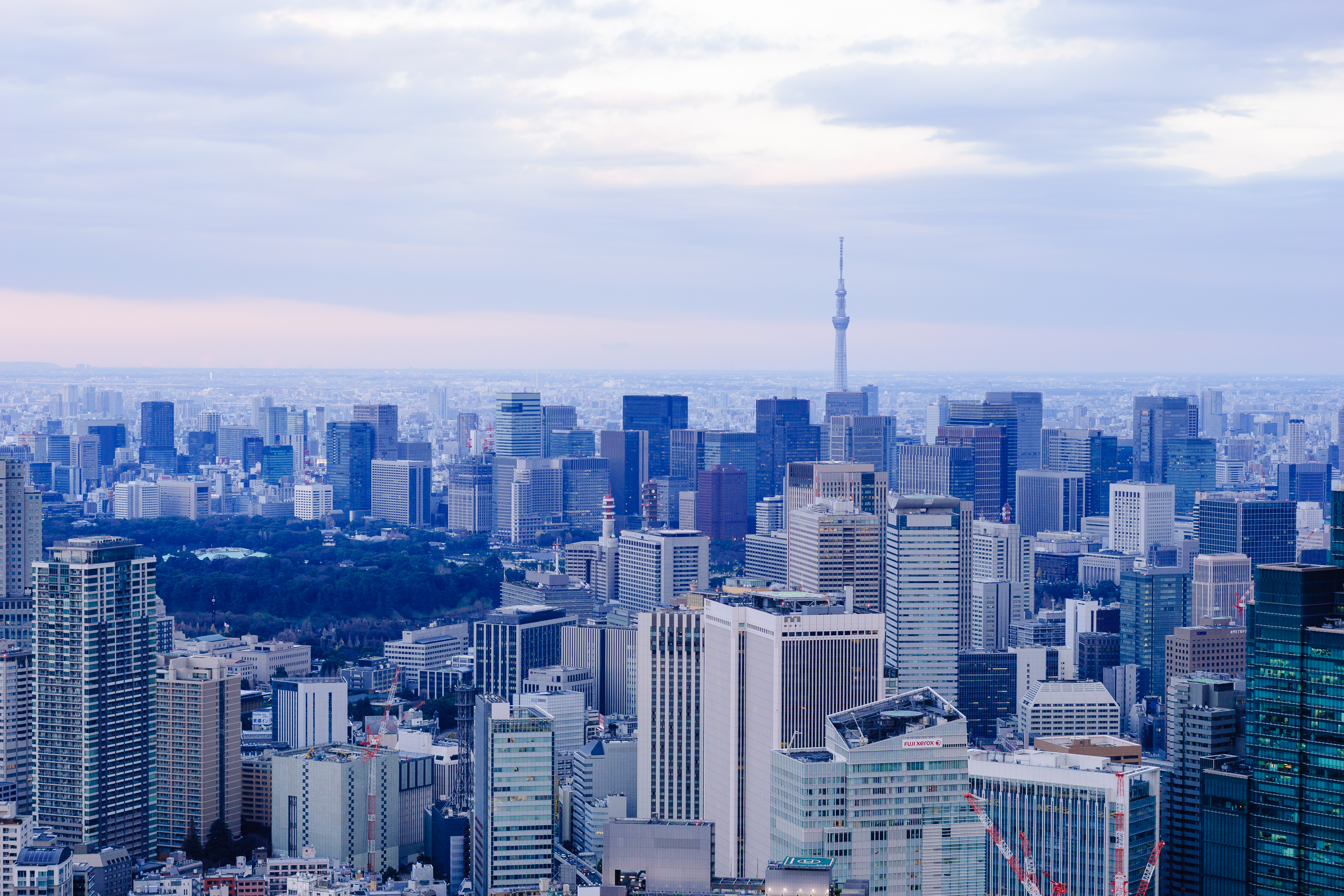
Tokyo (Chiyoda)

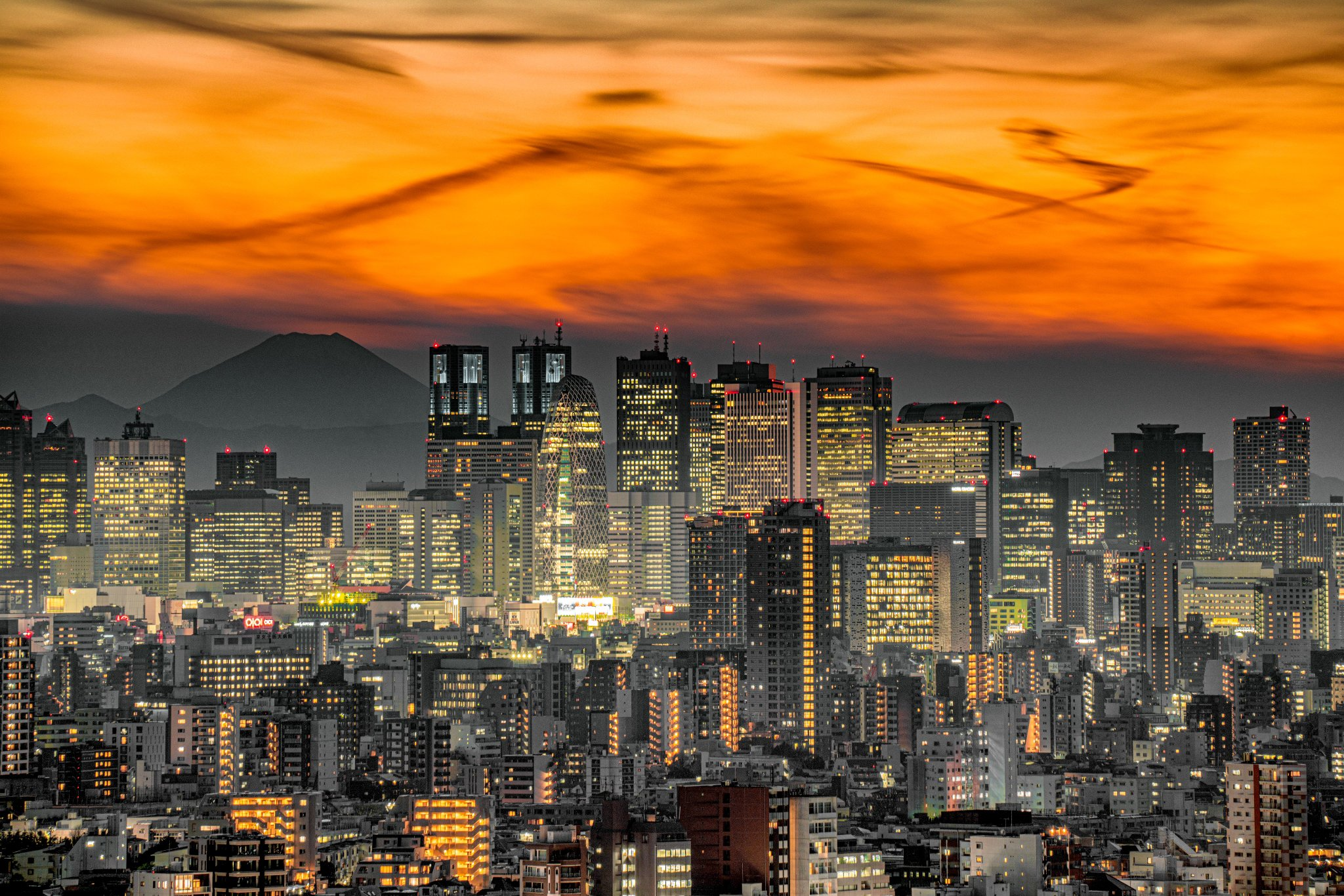
Tokyo (Shinjuku)

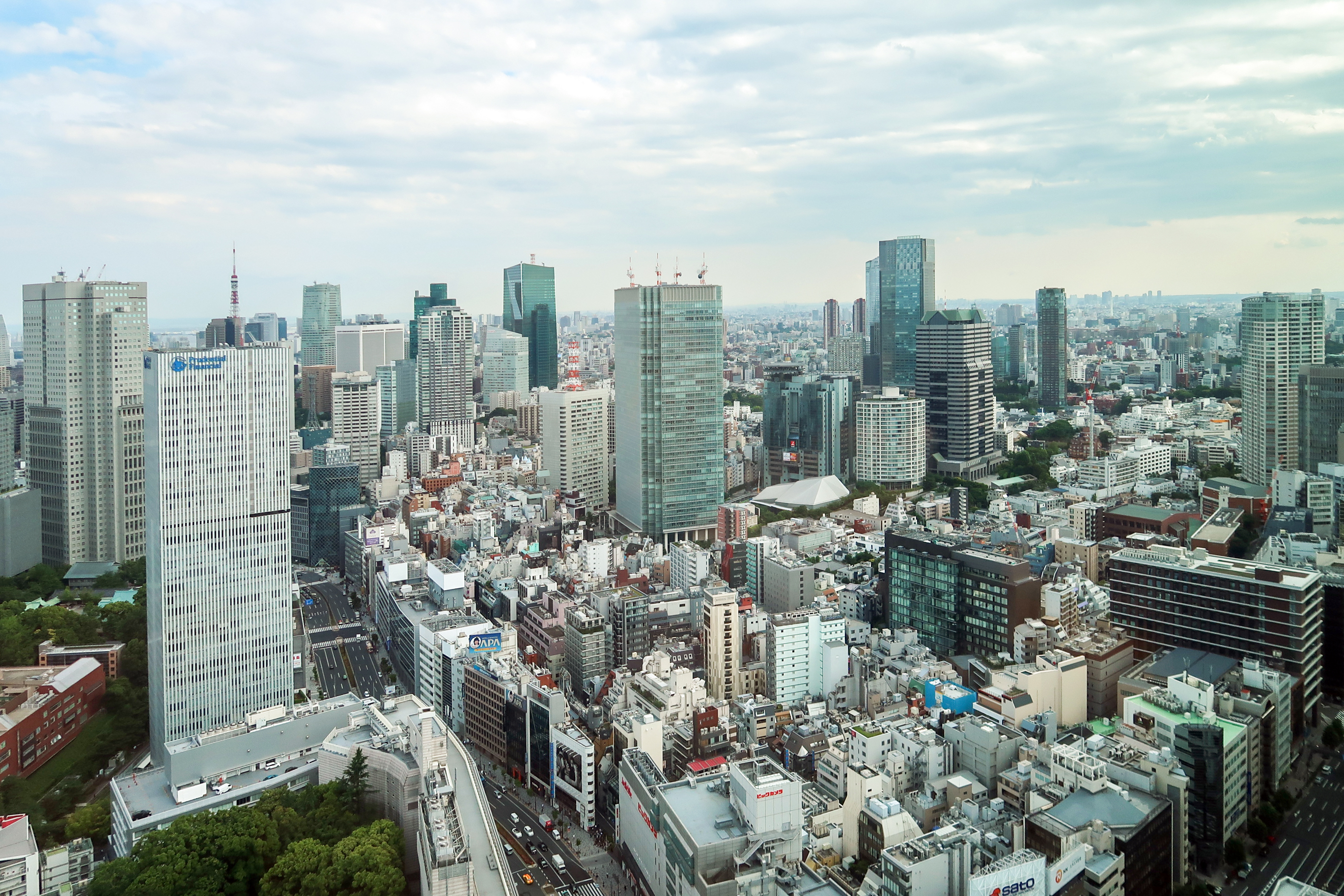
Tokyo (Minato)

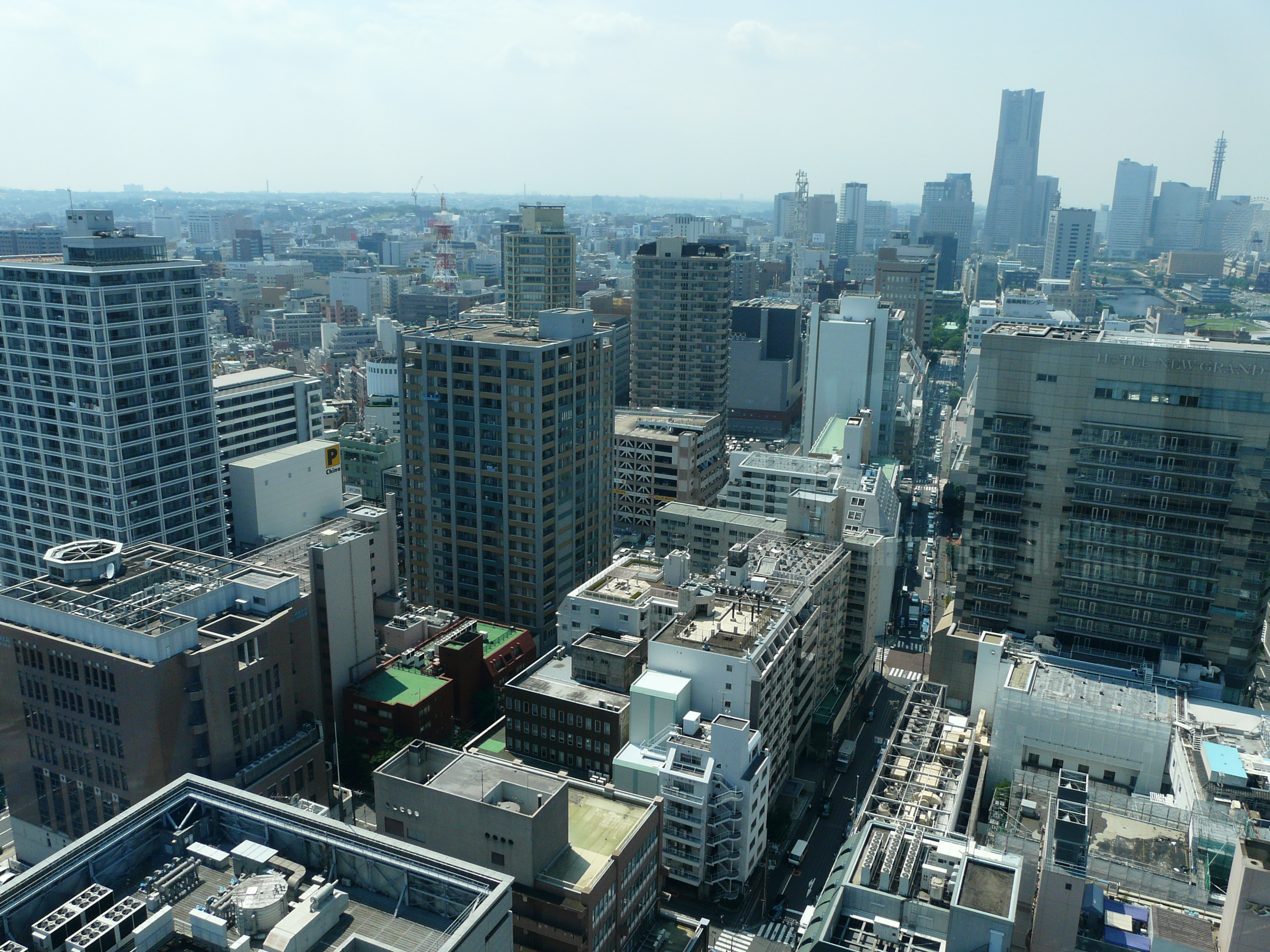
Yokohama (Kannai)

== Kazakhstan ==
In Kazakhstan, central business districts are concentrated primarily in Almaty and Astana, the country's largest cities. Almaty, as the former capital and financial hub, hosts the majority of national and international corporate offices, while Astana, the political center, has been developing modern commercial areas alongside government buildings.

In Almaty, the Nurly Tau Business Center serves as a multifunctional hub, combining office space, residential units, and leisure facilities. Covering approximately 300,000 m^{2}, it is organized in a "city within a city" layout with class A offices, entertainment spaces, and underground parking. Other business districts in Almaty include the Esentai Tower and areas along Kabanbai Batyr Avenue, which host financial institutions and corporate headquarters.

Astana's main commercial district is the Central Business District, featuring government buildings, banks, and modern office towers, designed to support the city's rapid urban expansion and status as the national capital.

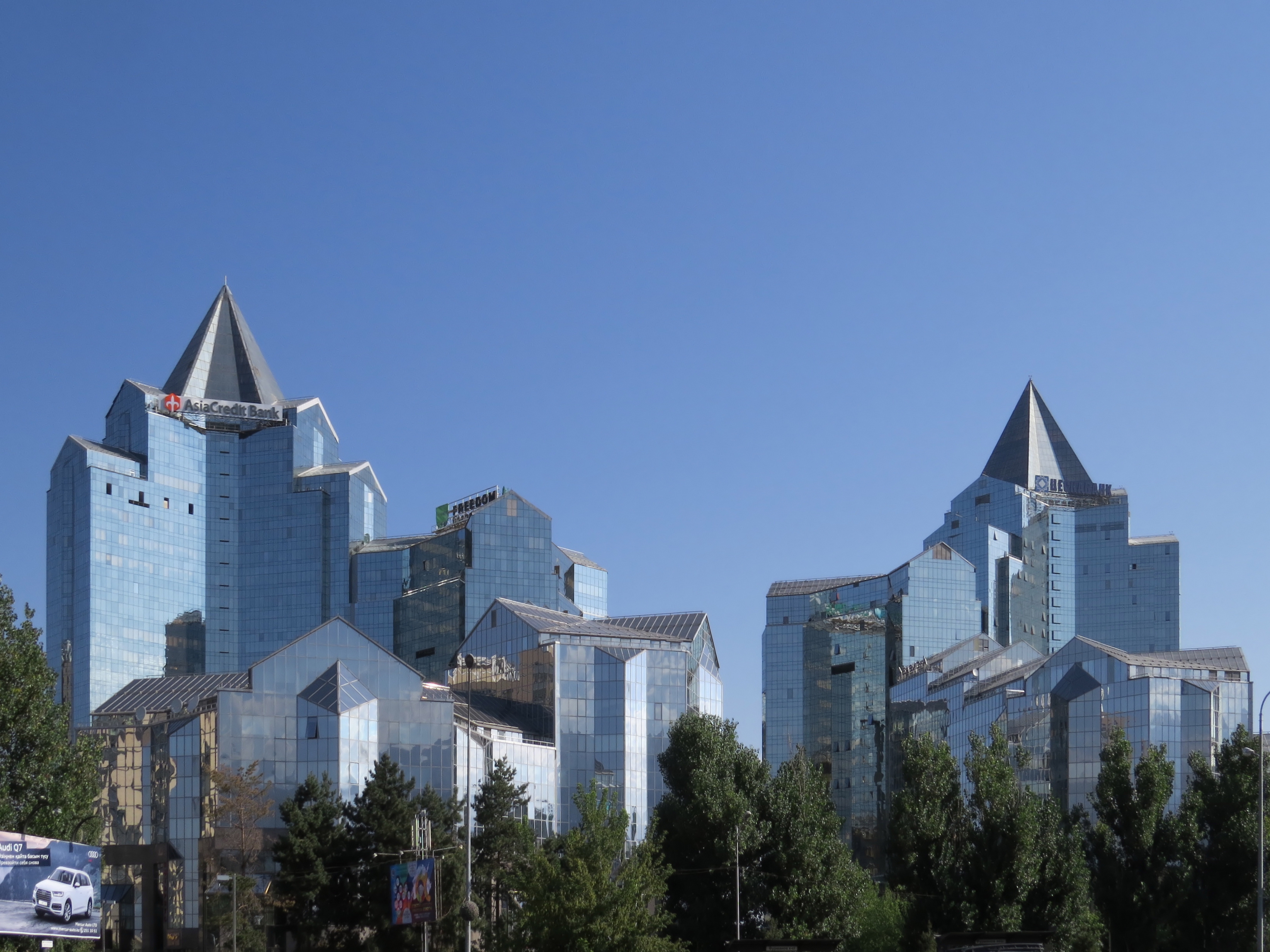
Nurly Tau Business Center in Almaty, Kazakhstan

Central Downtown in Astana

== Malta ==
In Malta, central business districts are concentrated primarily in St. Julian's and Sliema.

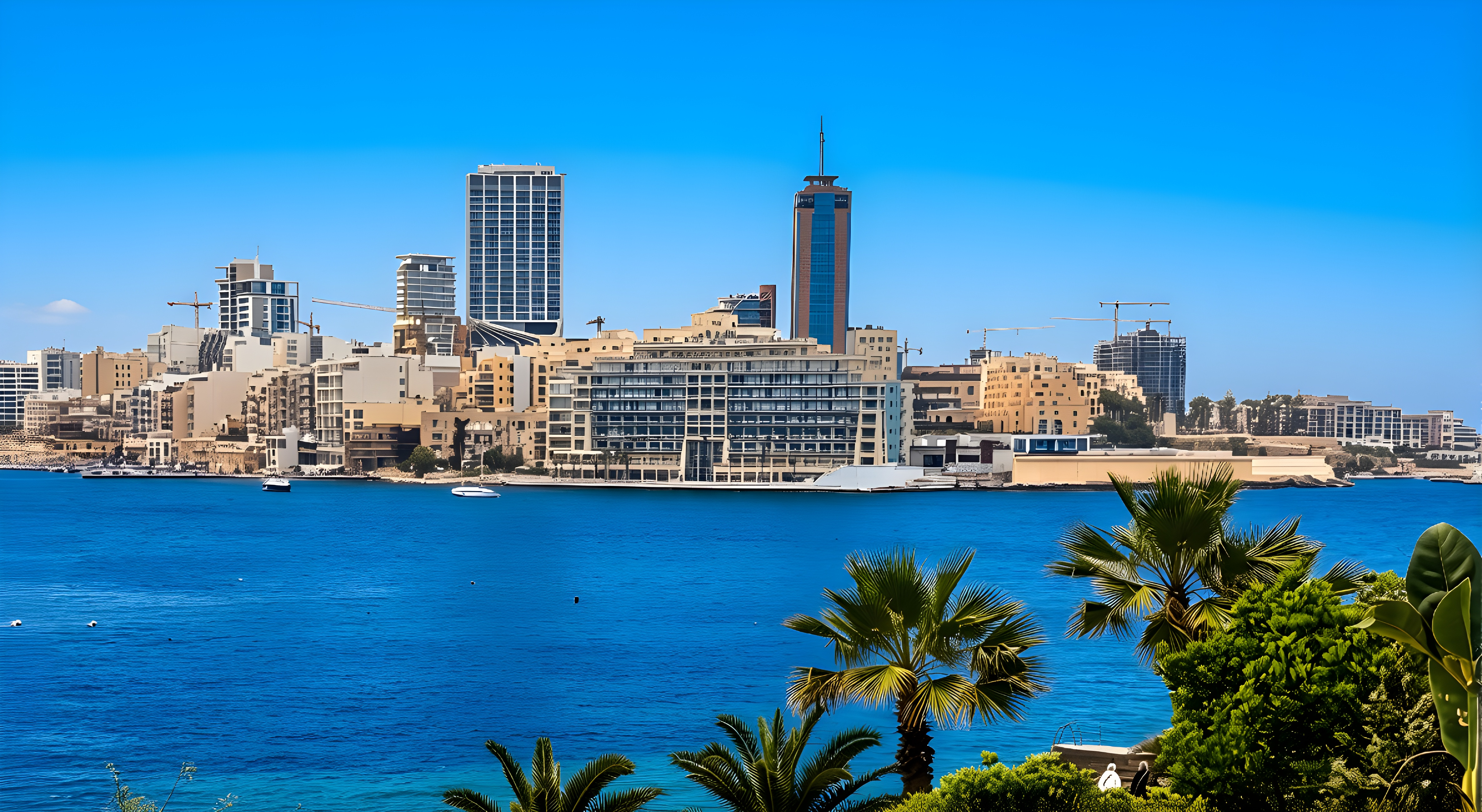
Business area in St. Julian's and Sliema in Malta

== Pakistan ==
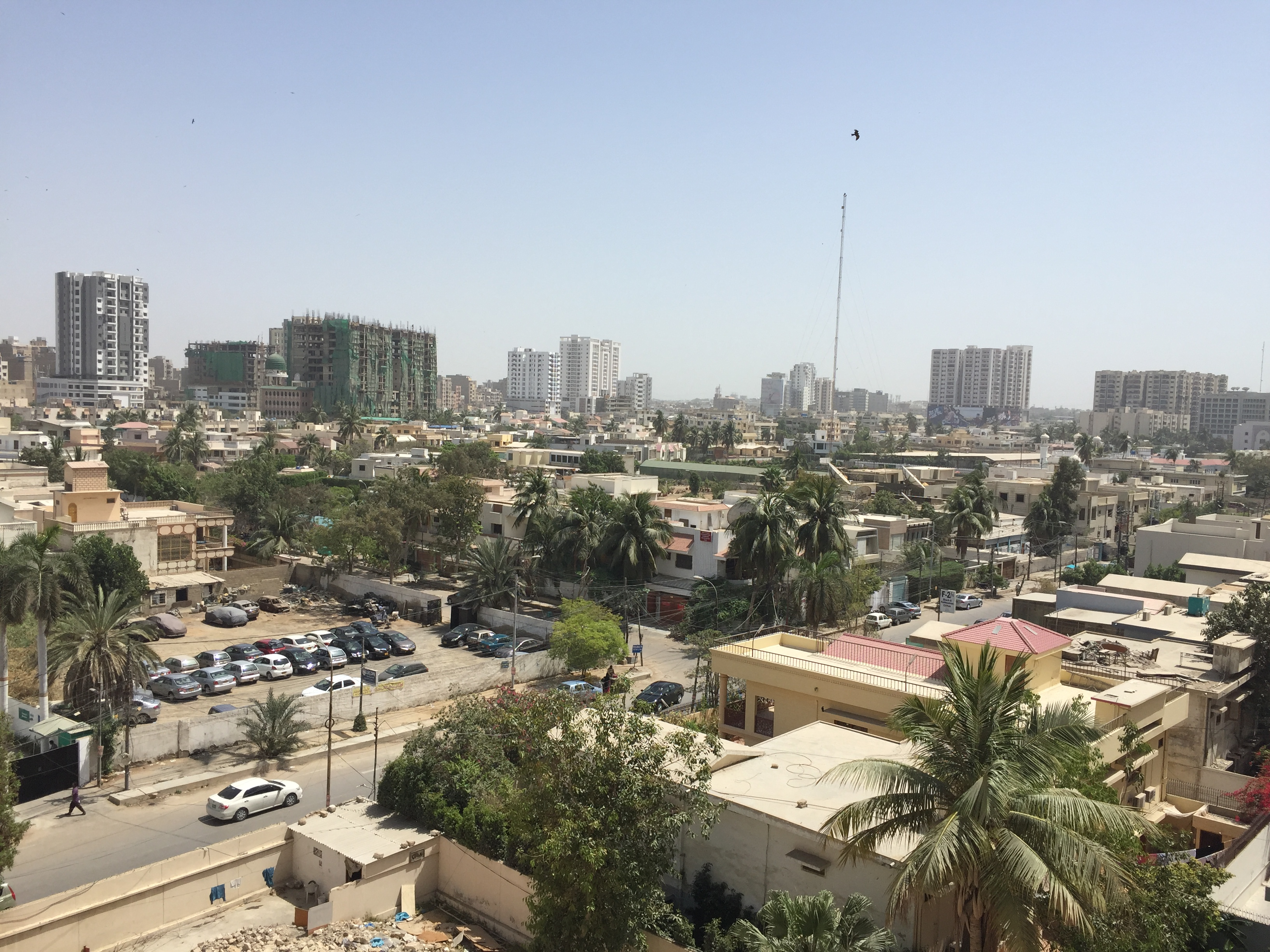
Clifton, Karachi in Pakistan

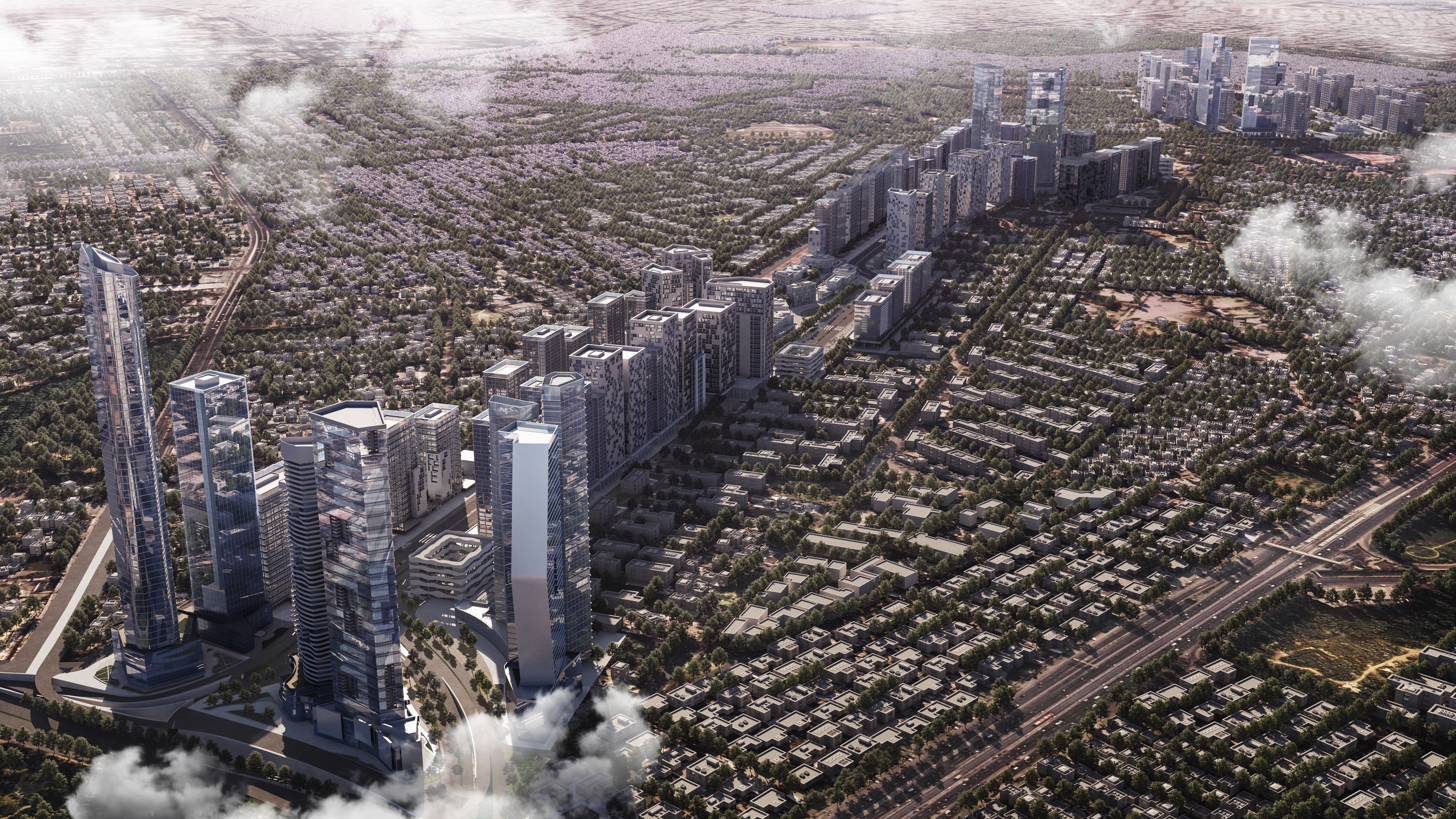
Pakistan's first central business district under construction

In Pakistan, a central business district or a large, concentrated urban setting within a settlement is called a shehar. Karachi is Pakistan's largest city and the country's economic hub; the I. I. Chundrigar Road acts as Karachi's main financial district. Shahra-e-Faisal in Karachi is also one of the most important business districts of Pakistan.

Gulberg, Lahore has a large number of important office buildings as well as many high-rises and shopping malls. Pakistan established its first central business district, Lahore Central Business District, also known as Central Business District Punjab (CBD Punjab) by an ACT of Parliament (LCBDDA Act, 2021) in February 2021.

Jinnah Avenue in Islamabad is the main business district of the city. Blue Area is the central business district of Islamabad.

D Ground is the central business district of Faisalabad and Saddar is the main central business district of Rawalpindi.

== Peru ==
In Peru, the central business district is San Isidro, in Lima, which hosts the majority of Peru's financial industry headquarters. Although still a largely residential district, the commercial and business activity located in or in the vicinity of the area. It has a permanent population of around 63,000 inhabitants and, during weekday business hours, a floating population that exceeds 700,000 daily commuters from other districts in Lima, the national capital.

San Isidro is served by three stations of El Metropolitano, Lima's bus rapid transit system: Estación Javier Prado, Estación Canaval y Moreyra (with over 16,000 daily passengers) and Estación Aramburú.

In the early 21st century, the southeastern district of Surco experienced a significant increase in upscale corporate developments in the area comprised by avenues Manuel Holguín, El Derby, El Polo, and La Encalada due to lower restrictions to grant construction permit and proximity to residential middle and upper class districts and is set to become, after traditional San Isidro and Miraflores, the new financial center of Lima.

== Philippines ==
The Philippines has three major central business districts, which are all located in Metro Manila. Bonifacio Global City is the newest and one of the largest central business districts in the Philippines. The Bases Conversion and Development Authority (BCDA), Ayala Land, Inc. and Evergreen Holdings, Inc. controls Fort Bonifacio Development Corporation, which oversees the master planning of Bonifacio Global City. Ortigas Center, with an area of more than 100 hectares (250 acres), is the Philippines' second most important business district after the Makati CBD and is home to Asian Development Bank. Meanwhile, the Makati Central Business District, also known as the Makati CBD, is the leading financial and the largest central business district in the Philippines.

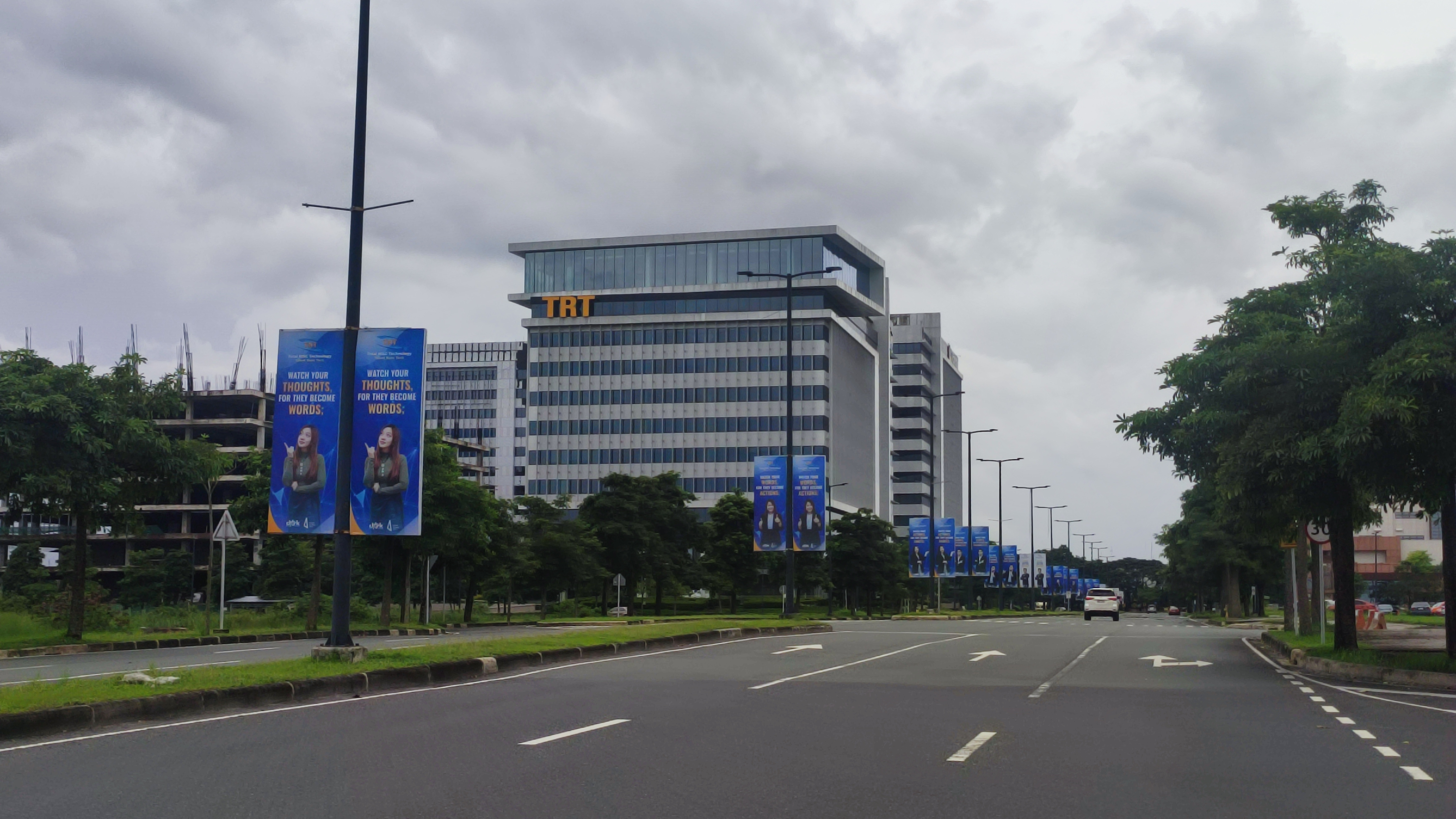
Clark Global City

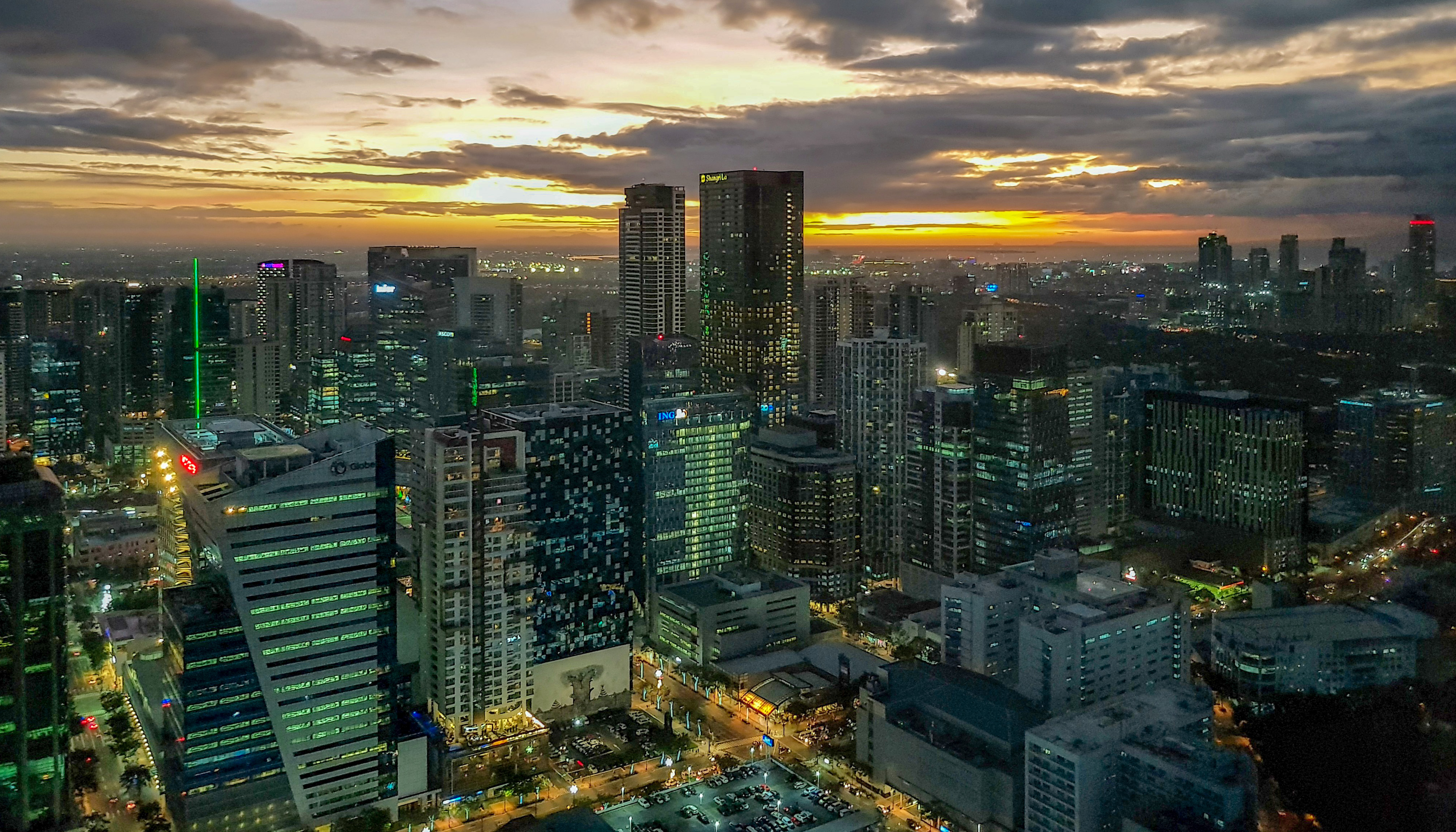
Bonifacio Global City

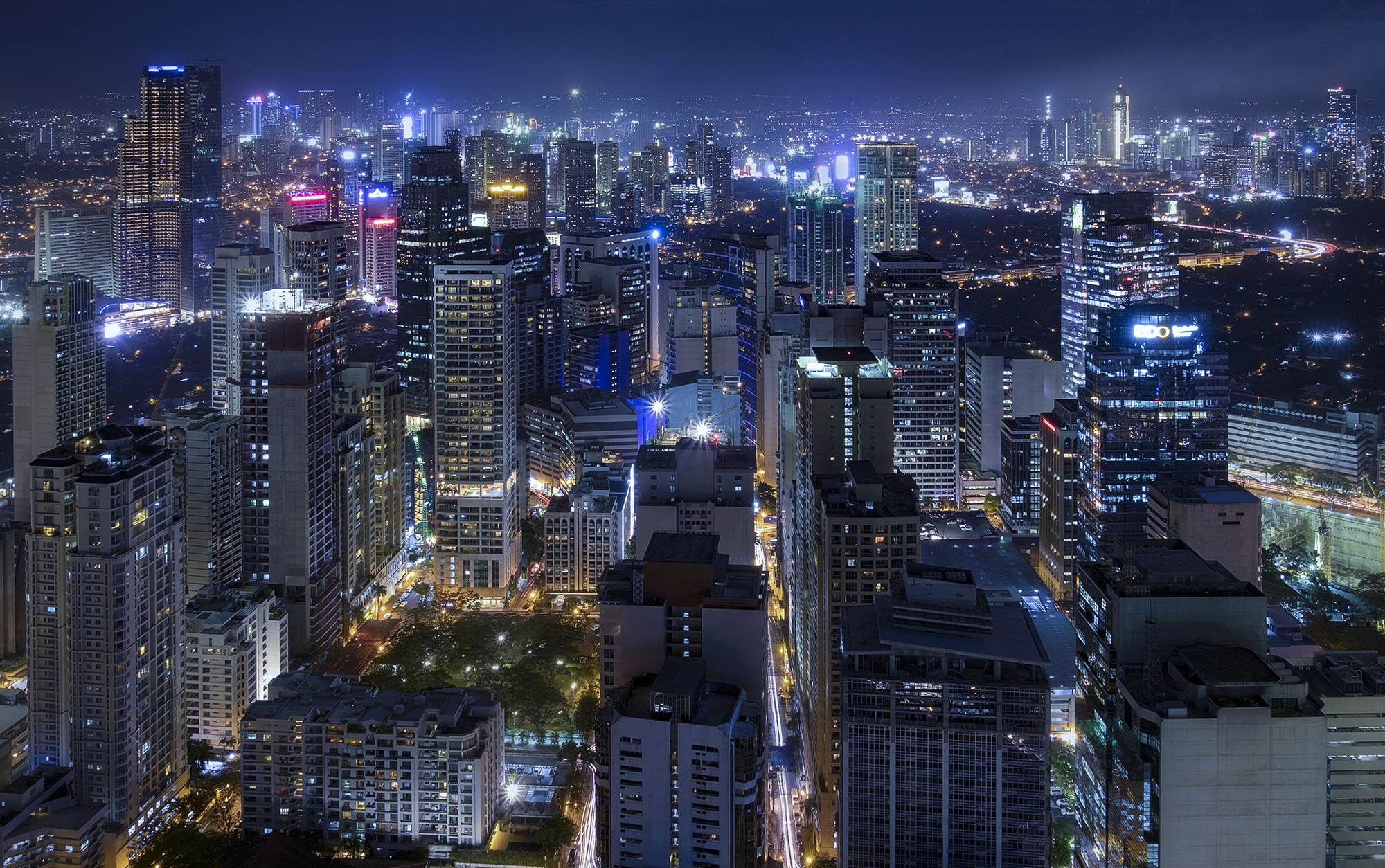
Makati Central Business District

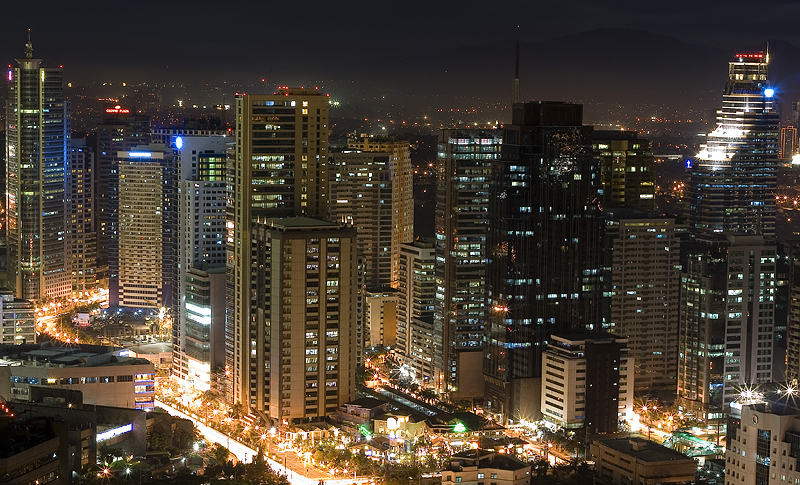
Ortigas Center

== Poland ==
In Poland, the terms śródmieście or centrum are often used to describe the central business district.

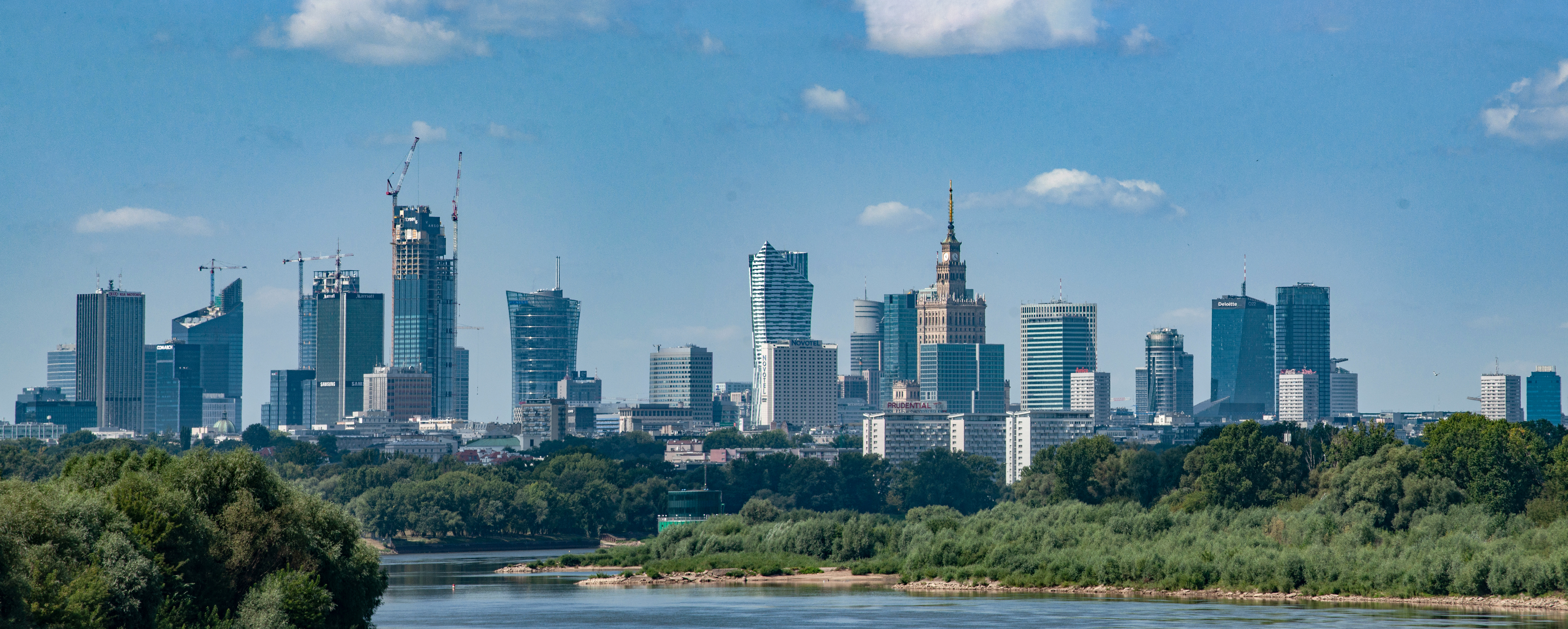
Business center in Warsaw

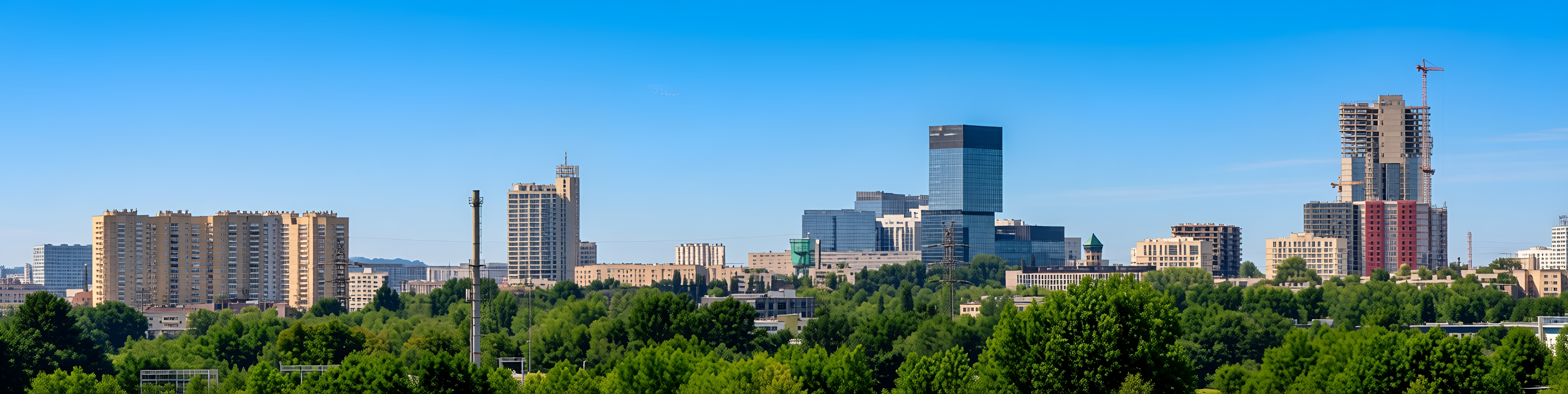
Business center in Katowice

== Russia ==
The largest central business district in Russia is the Moscow International Business Center (MIBC) in Moscow, a commercial development located just east of the Third Ring Road at the western edge of the Presnensky District in the Central Administrative Okrug of the city. As of 2021, it is still under development. The construction of the MIBC takes place on the Presnenskaya Embankment of the Moskva River, approximately 4 kilometers (2.5 mi) west of Red Square, overlooked by the Third Ring Road. The project occupies an area of 60 hectares.

The second-largest central business district is Yekaterinburg-City in Yekaterinburg, the fourth-largest city in the country. It is located on the Iset River, and is under development as of 2021. The area occupies five hectares.

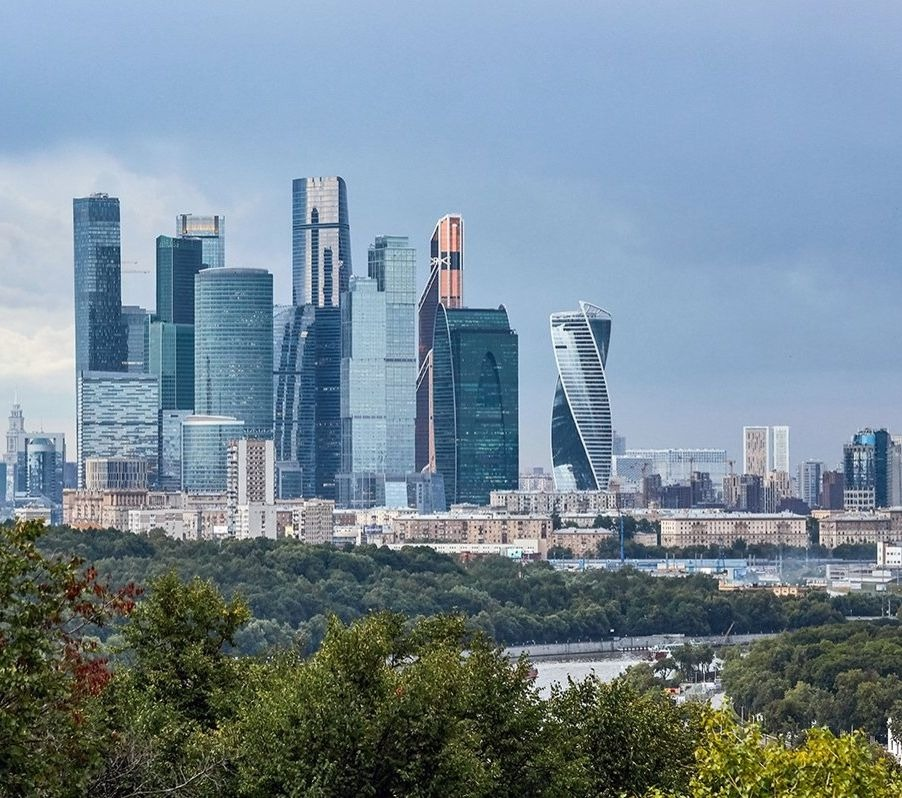
MIBC in Moscow, one of the largest financial centers in Europe and the world, includes several of Europe's tallest skyscrapers.

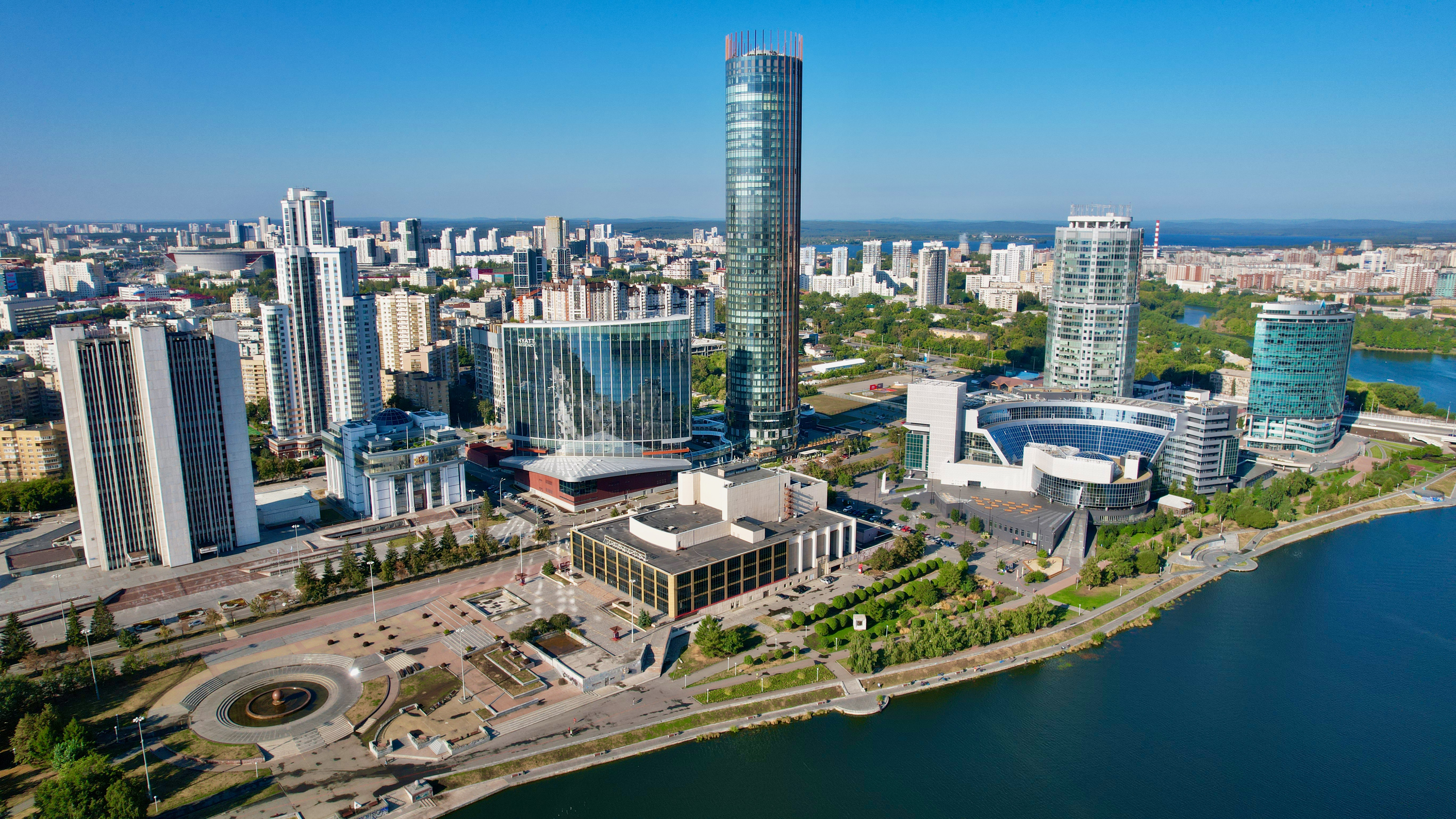
Yekaterinburg-City in Yekaterinburg, the second-largest central business district in Russia

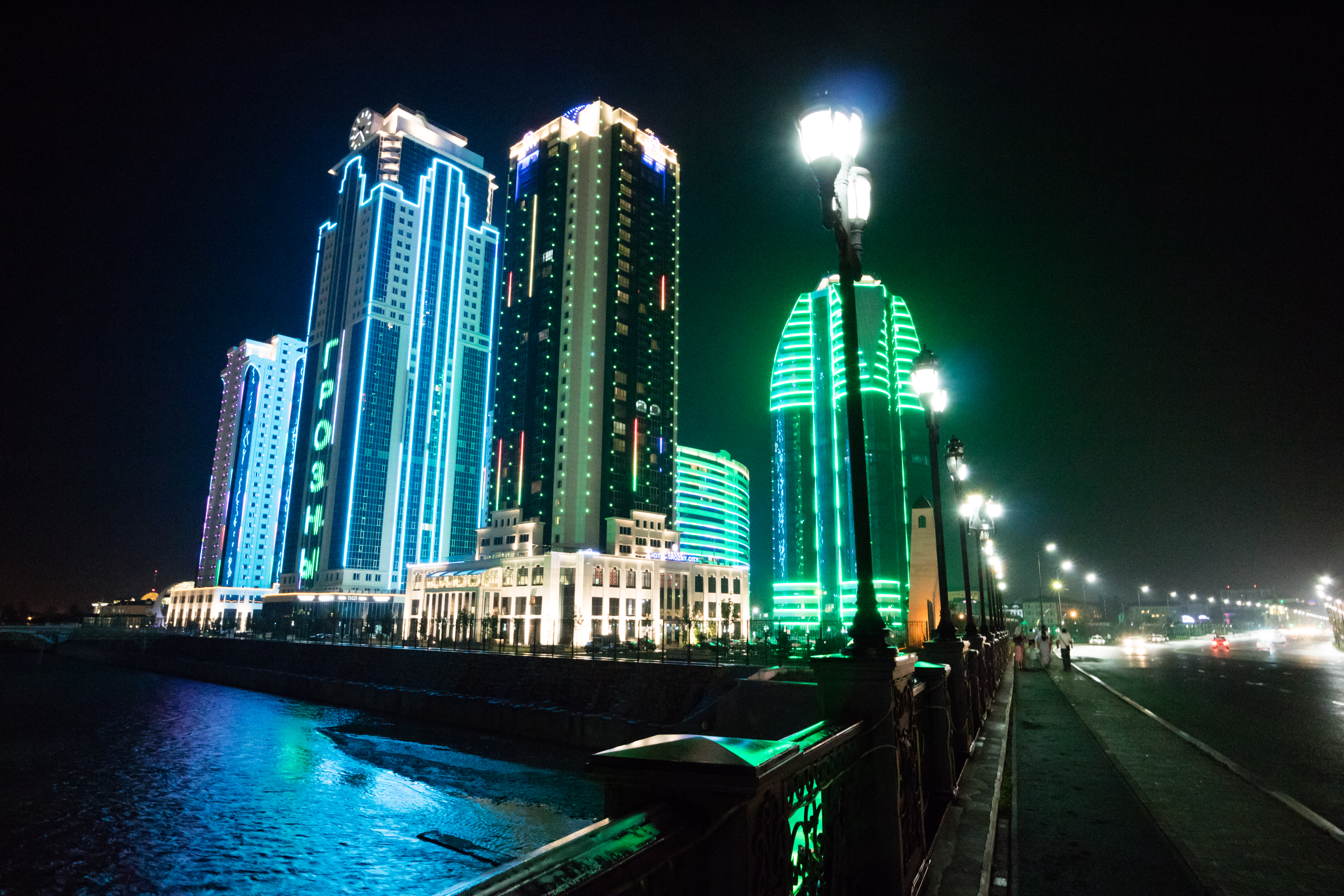
Grozny-City in Grozny

== Saudi Arabia ==
Saudi Arabia has several business districts, including:

- Mecca (King Abdullah Economic City)
- Riyadh (King Abdullah Financial District)
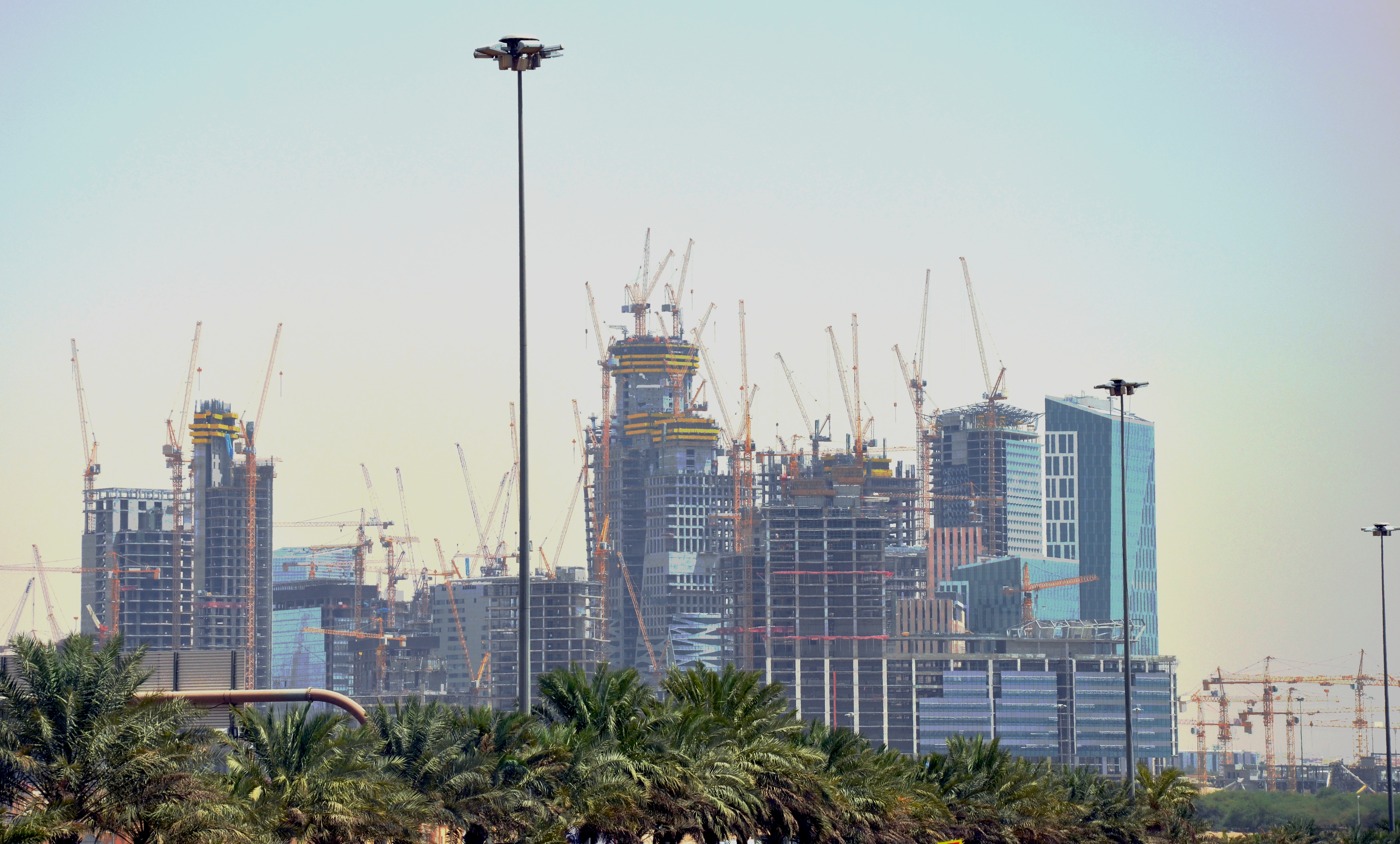

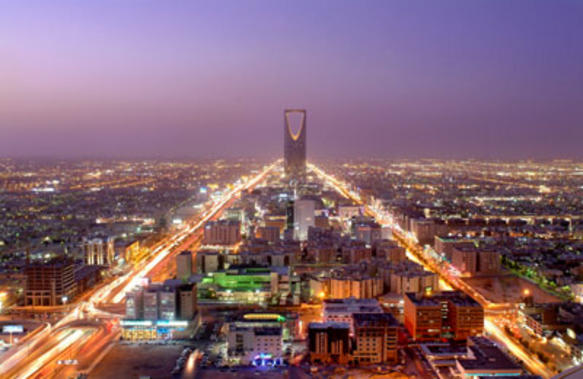

== Singapore ==
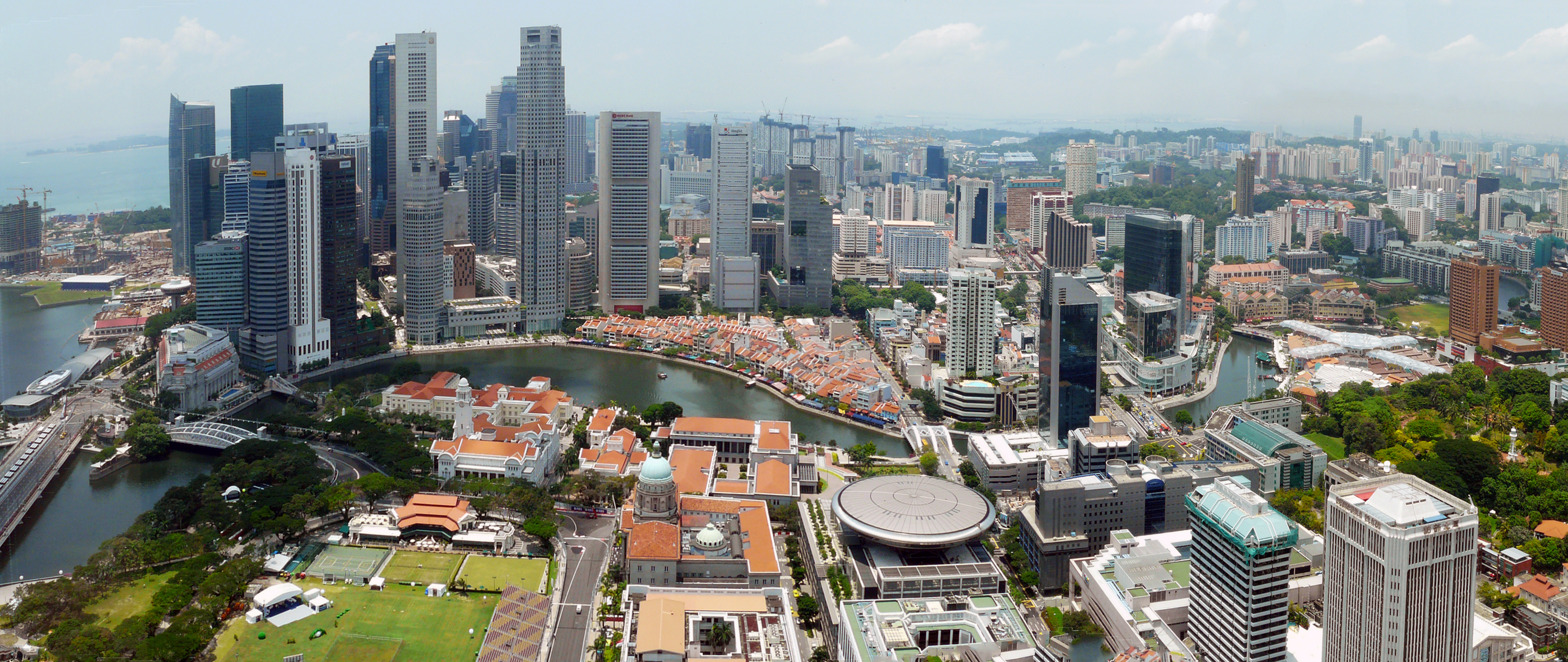
The Singapore River Planning Area seen from the eastern bank of the Singapore River with the central business district located on its western bank

In Singapore, the CBD is in the Downtown Core, one of the constituent planning areas of the Central Area, the country's city center. Its densest point is centered around Raffles Place, where most of Singapore's skyscrapers are located. The CBD sometimes also describes Central Area as a whole.

Singapore's CBD is the historic heart of the city-state, which makes it a mix of a tourist attraction and a business center. The CBD includes several multinational corporate headquarters, Singapore Management University, and historical buildings and museums.

As of 2016, the Singaporean government intends to redevelop Jurong East into a second CBD in Singapore. The area has also been earmarked as the site of the rail terminus for the Kuala Lumpur–Singapore High Speed Rail.

== South Africa ==
South Africa's largest cities - Cape Town, Durban, Johannesburg, Pretoria, and Port Elizabeth - all have CBDs. The country's CBDs are home to the majority of the corporate headquarters of South Africa's largest companies as well as foreign institutions. Its CBDs are also home to major convention centers, tourist attractions, and many of the country's tallest buildings.

Cape Town CBD has one of South Africa's most iconic skylines. The CBD sits in the City Bowl region, below Table Mountain, and next to the V&A Waterfront, and the Port of Cape Town.

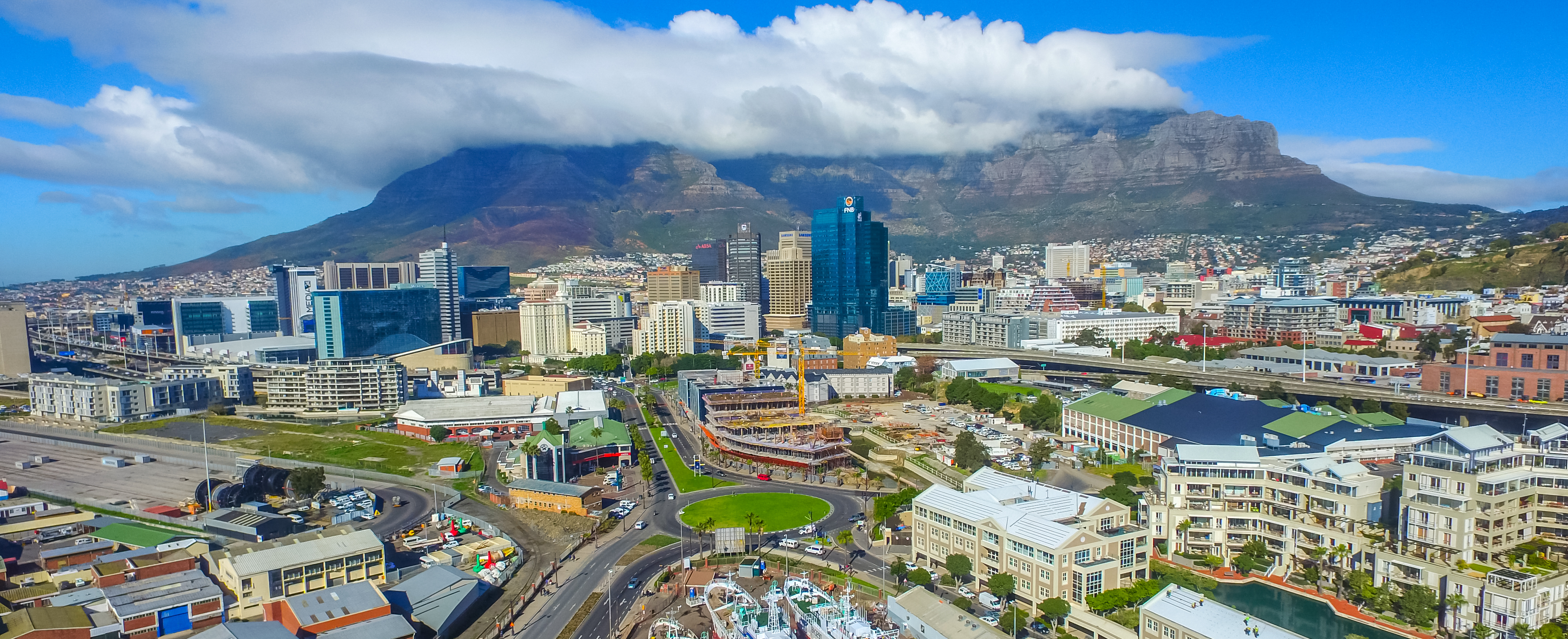
Cape Town CBD

== South Korea ==
In South Korea, the national capital of Seoul includes three central business districts. The Downtown Seoul, a historic area inside the Fortress Wall of Seoul in the Jongno and Jung districts has historically been the city's political, social and cultural heart, and still houses many corporate headquarters and political institutions in South Korea. It is also the most popular area for tourists and the city's main commercial district. While the district has a high density of high rise buildings, the tallest building, the SK Building, only reaches a height of 160m due to historic preservation regulations.

The second main district, located in the southeast part of Seoul, is Gangnam District, an area that was developed in the 1980s and is now among the city's most affluent neighborhoods. The Gangnam District has concentration mainly in economic power of Seoul, as many of prominent company HQs are located on Teheran Avenue. Gangnam Avenue and Yeondong Avenue, which includes the COEX mall, are major thoroughfares in Seoul. The tallest buildings in Gangnam include Tower Palace One, a residential complex, Trade Tower, Gangnam Finance Center, and Parnas Tower.

Seoul's third business district is Yeouido, an island located in central Seoul in the Yeongdeungpo District. Yeouido was developed in the 1970s; since the 1990s, however, it has become Seoul's financial center. Smaller in geographic size that the other two business districts, Yeouido has some of Seoul's tallest skyscrapers, including Parc1 Tower, International Finance Center Seoul, and the 63 Building. Yeouido is where the National Assembly of South Korea and many media companies and political institutions are based.

Smaller but notable central business districts in South Korea include the Jamsil area, which is the location of the 555-metre tall Lotte World Tower, Guro Digital Complex, Gasan Digital Complex, the Magok Business District, the Sangam Digital Media City, the Munjeong Administrative Town, and Mapo Avenue. The area near Yongsan Station, including the proposed Yongsan International Business District, is considered an emerging major commercial district that will exist in synergy with nearby Yeouido.

In Busan, South Korea's second-largest city, the central business district is along the Jungang Avenue, starting around the commercial area of Seomyeon Station and then proceeding south to the Busan International Finance Center in Munhyeon-dong and the area near Busan Station and Jungang-dong, where several corporate offices are located. A second major business district in Busan is Centum City, in the Haeundae District.

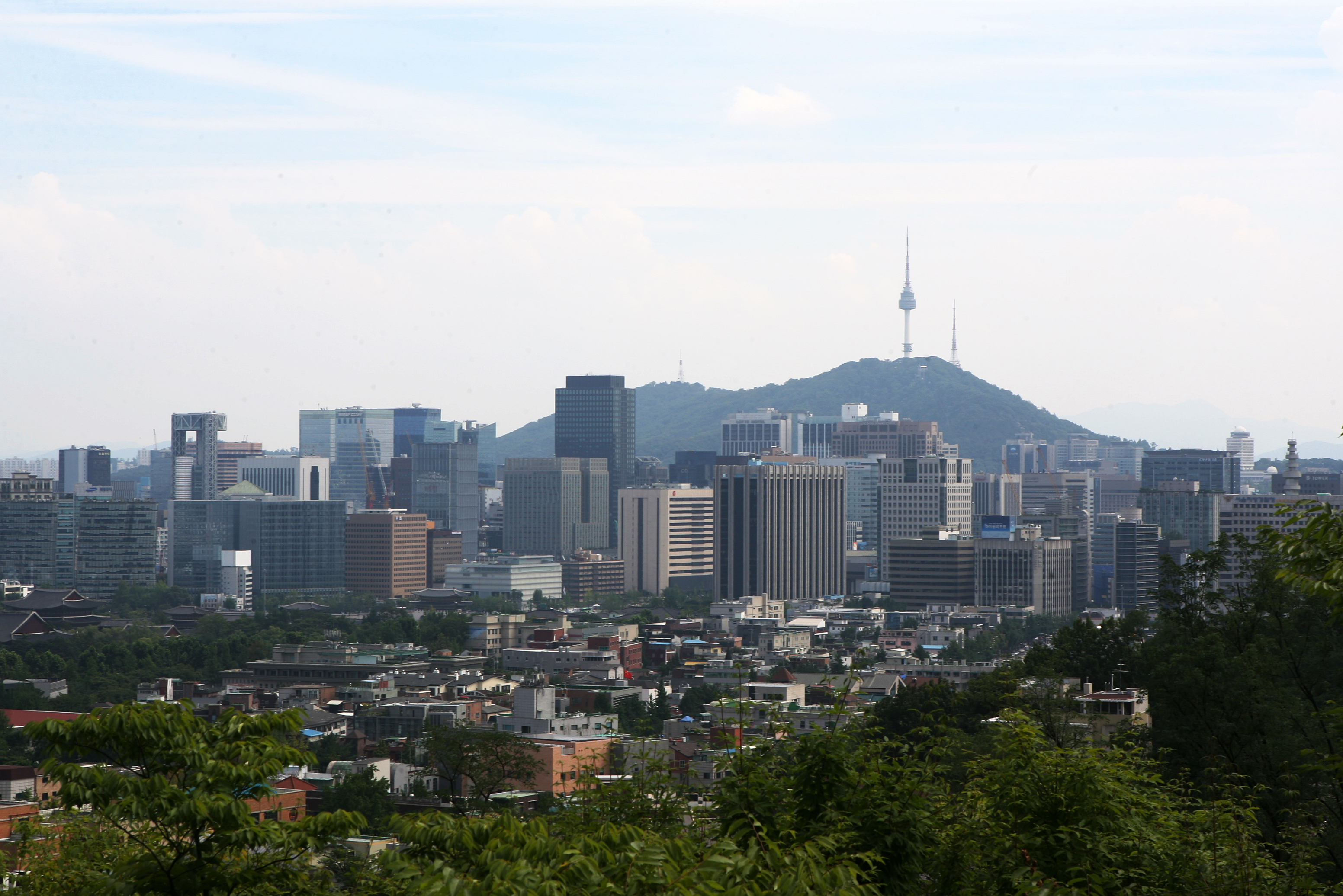
Seoul (Downtown Seoul)

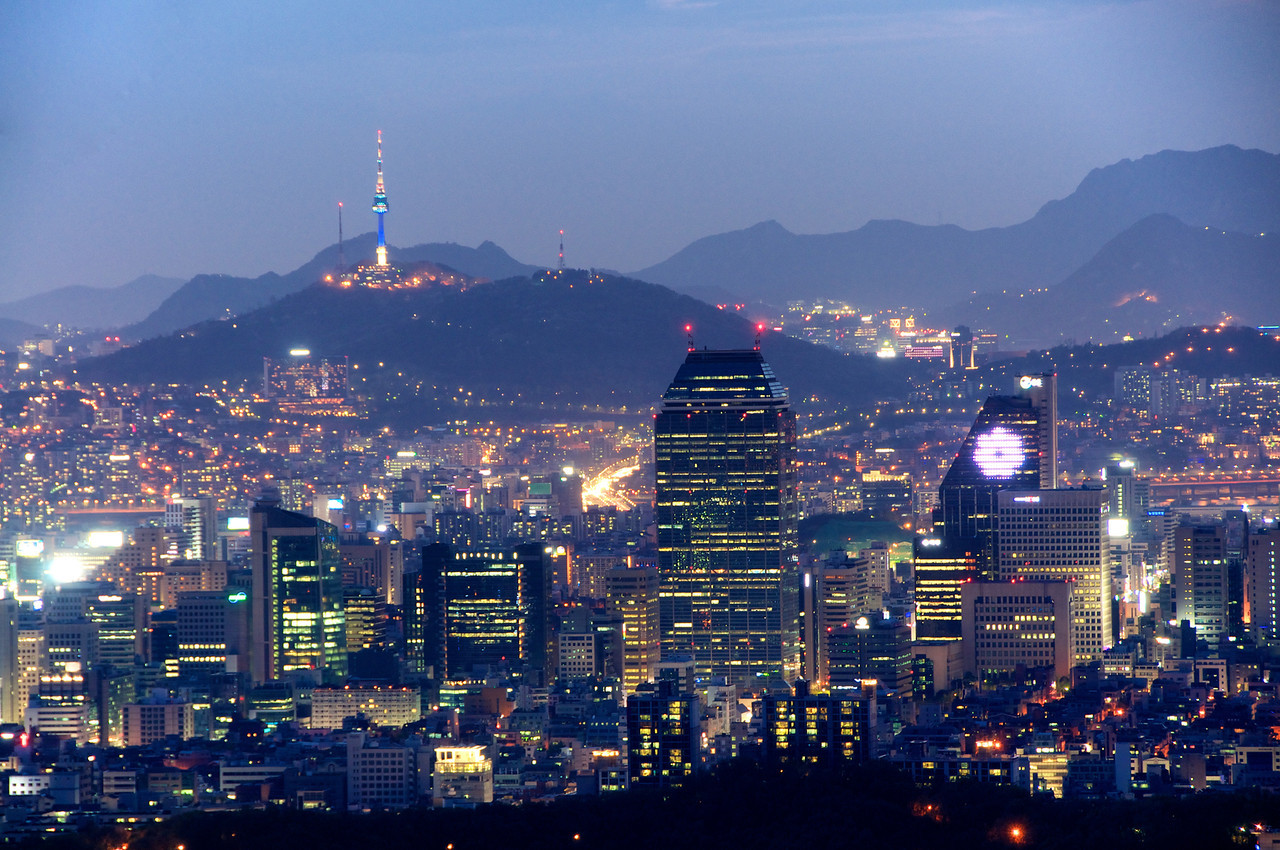
Seoul (Gangnam)

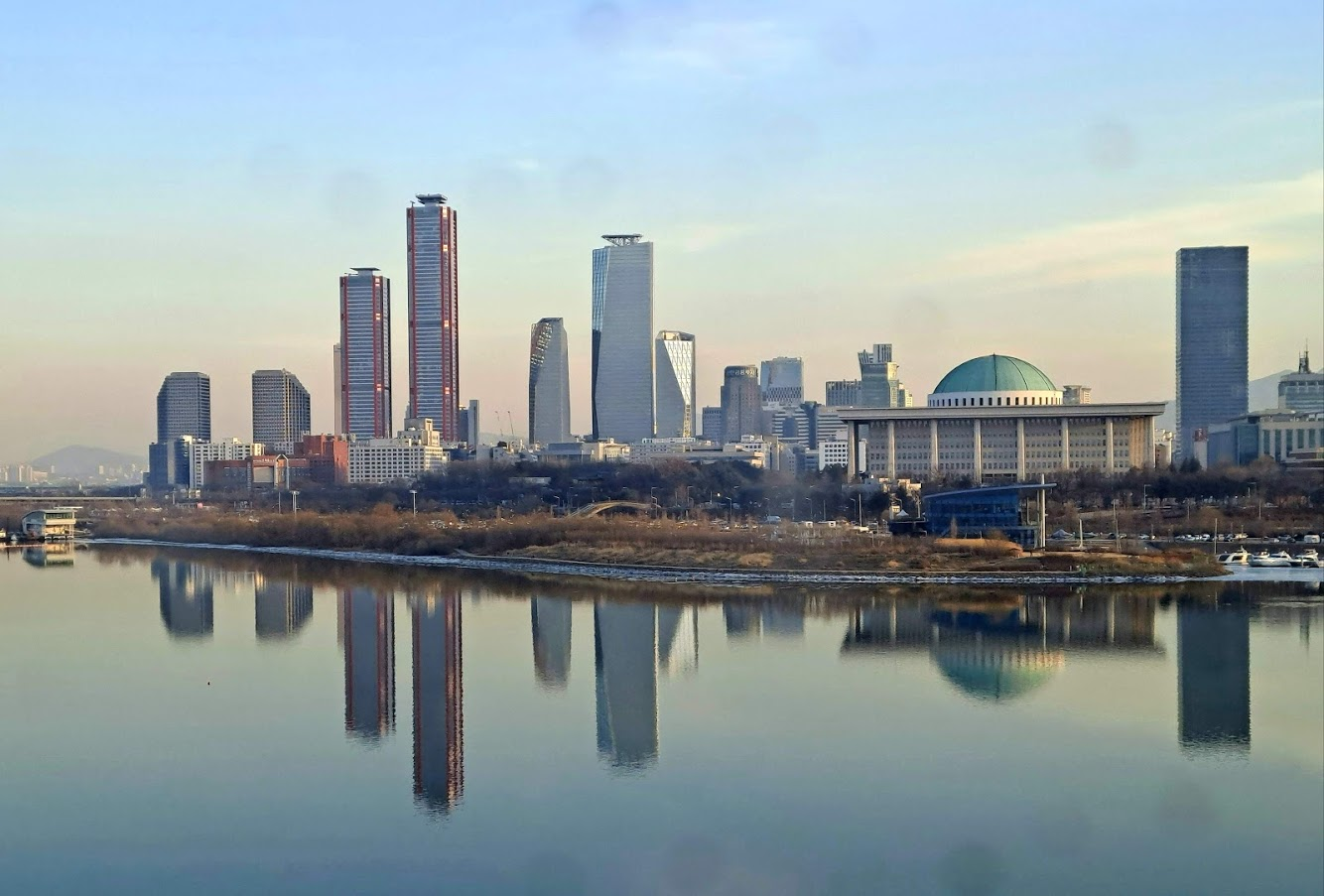
Seoul (Yeouido)

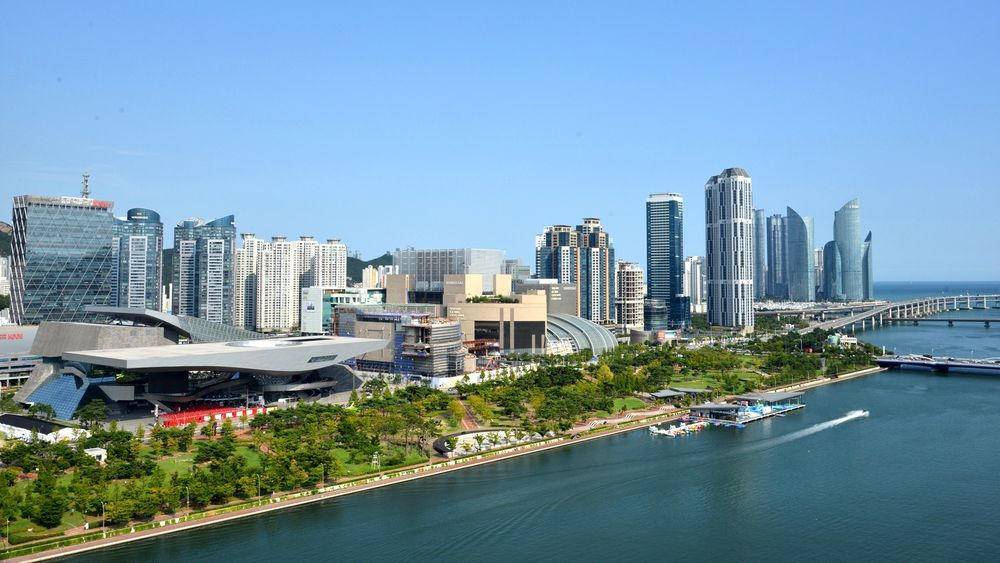
Busan (Haeundae)

== Spain ==
In Spain, the largest central business districts are in Madrid, the national capital. Paseo de la Castellana includes the city's main business districts: the Gate of Europe, AZCA, and CTBA. AZCA is 19-hectare (47-acre) super block near Real Madrid's stadium Santiago Bernabéu. It was the country's main business area during the late 20th century when most of the region's skyscrapers were developed. The tallest building in AZCA is the Torre Picasso, a 158-metre tower that was designed by Minoru Yamasaki architect, and includes the national headquarters for several multinational corporations, including Google and Deloitte.

There is also Madrid Nuevo Norte, starting construction in 2025. Making it one of the largest urban rehabilitation projects in Europe. It will include a new Central Business District, connecting with the already constructed Cuatro Torres Business Area.

The Gate of Europe has twin towers, which hold Spanish bank Bankia and Realia, a real estate company. A few blocks north of the Gate of Europe is CTBA, a complex of four skyscrapers that are the tallest in Spain. Notable architects, including Norman Foster, Ieoh Ming Pei, and Cesar Pelli, have designed its towers, which were completed in 2008. The tallest building, Torre de Cristal, is the fourth-tallest building is Western Europe with a height of 250 meters (820 ft). The complex houses the Spain-based headquarters for several multinational corporations, including KPMG, Coca-Cola, Volkswagen, Bankia, Cepsa, PwC, OHL, and the embassies of the Netherlands, United Kingdom, Canada and Australia, and a five-star hotel owned by Eurostars. A fifth tower is being for Instituto de Empresa university.

In Barcelona, the 22@, Gran Via and Granvia l'Hospitalet are the city's two main business districts. The Catalan capital does not have a reputation for skyscrapers and financial hubs, but has attracted several media and technology companies, including Microsoft and Yahoo!. In 2005, the Torre Agbar, designed by French architect Jean Nouvel, is the third-tallest building in Barcelona with a height of 145 meters (476 ft) and was intended to become a Hyatt hotel once administrative issues are resolved.

Moreover, Barcelona is building the new La Sagrera station which will include a new office buildings, parks and culture centers. Construction has already started by moving the railway tracks in the area underground.

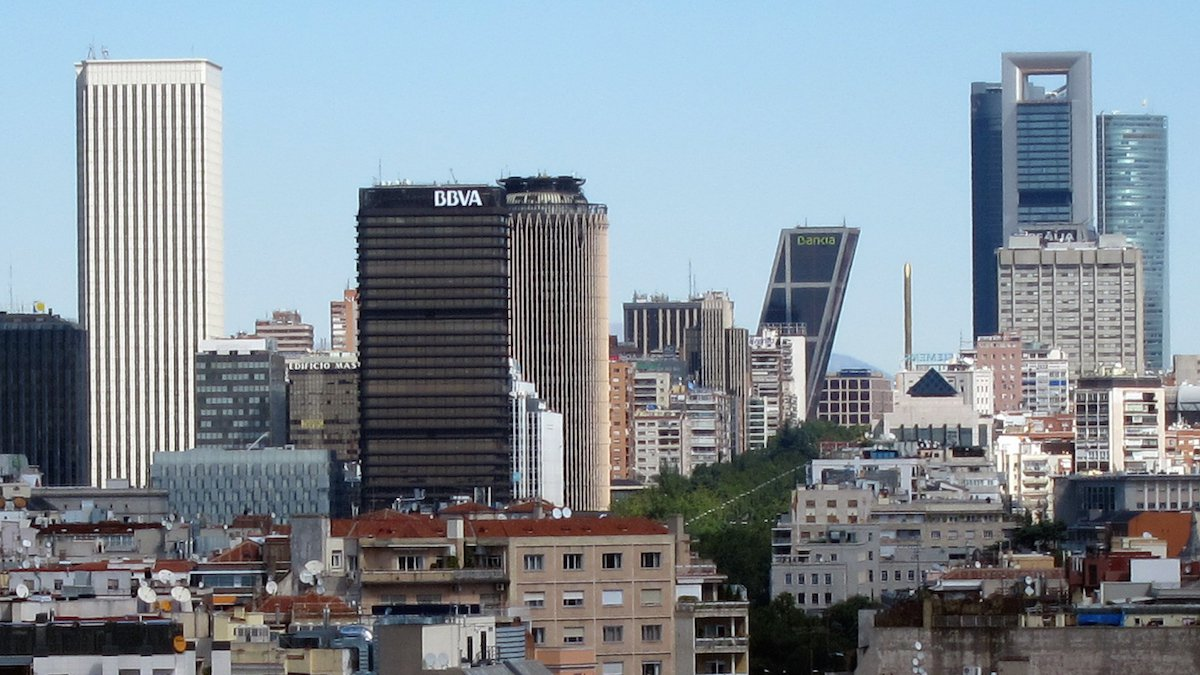
AZCA and CTBA business districts in Madrid

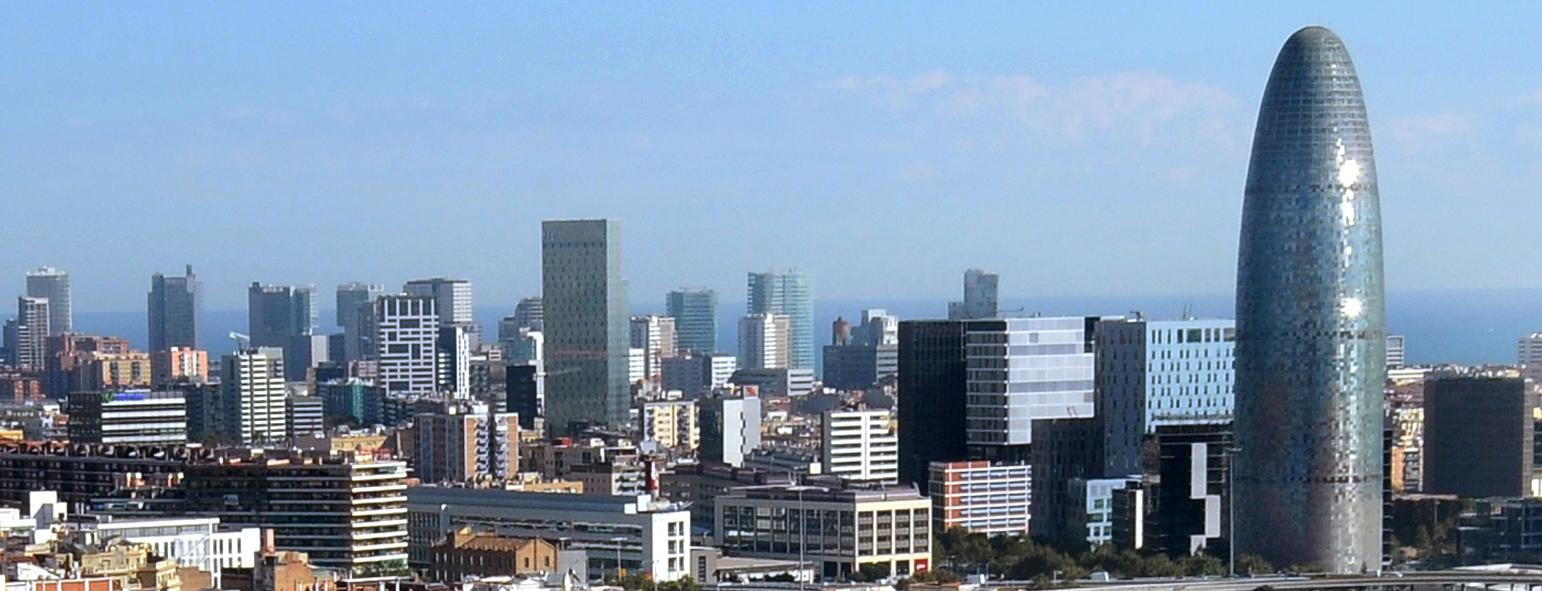
22@ district in Barcelona

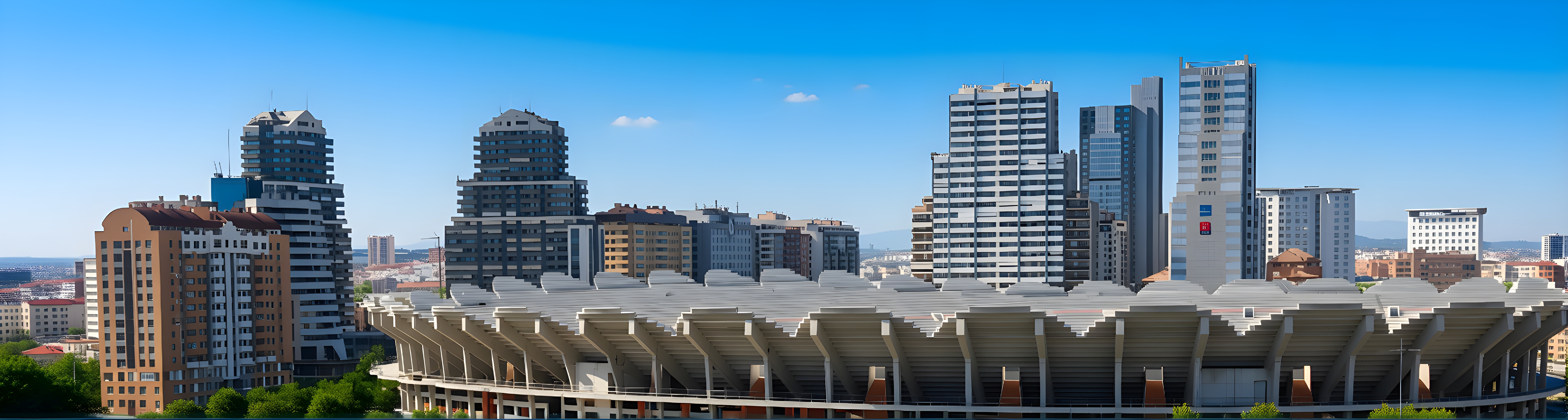
business district in Valencia

== Taiwan ==
In Taiwan, the term "city centre" (Chinese: 市中心) is often used instead of central business district, but a different commercial district outside of the historic core is typically labelled a CBD (Chinese: 中心商業區), "financial district" (Chinese: 金融貿易區), or "Yolk area" (Chinese: 蛋黃區). Taiwan also has many traditional central business districts.

In Taipei, the capital city of Taiwan, the area around its main railway station, including the Taipei West District Gateway Project, is regarded as Taipei's historic centre; it is home to many of Taiwan's national government buildings, including the Presidential Office, the Executive Yuan, the Control Yuan, the Legislative Yuan, the Judicial Yuan, and various government ministries.

The second main district, in the central part Taipei, is the Xinyi Special District, which was developed mostly in the 1990s, and has emerged as Taipei's financial, political, and commercial center. The district includes the greatest concentration of corporate headquarters and offices in Taipei and is amongst the nation's largest shopping districts. It also includes many of Taipei's tallest skyscrapers, including the 509.2-meter (1,671 ft)-tall Taipei 101, Taipei Nan Shan Plaza, and Fubon Xinyi A25.

Taipei's third business district, Nangang District, is situated in the very east of the city. Nangang was developed in the early 21st century and is the seat of the Academia Sinica, Taipei World Trade Center Nangang Exhibition Hall, and Nankang Software Park (NKSP).

Greater Taipei serves as a multi-central metropolitan area, and a few other areas have become important business districts, including Daan District, Xinban Special District, Neihu District and Xinzhuang Sub-city Center, which is considered to have the potential to emerge as a major commercial district in Taiwan, functioning in synergy with nearby Sanchong District and Wugu District.

In Taichung, Taiwan's second-largest city after Taipei, the central business district is Taichung's 7th Redevelopment Zone. It features broad and widely spaced boulevards, attractive apartments, department stores, and office towers, which are brightly lit at night.

In Kaohsiung, Taiwan's harbour city, the central business district is Asia New Bay Area, which is home to the city's tallest skyscrapers, including 85 Sky Tower and Farglory THE ONE and Port of Kaohsiung, the nation's largest port.

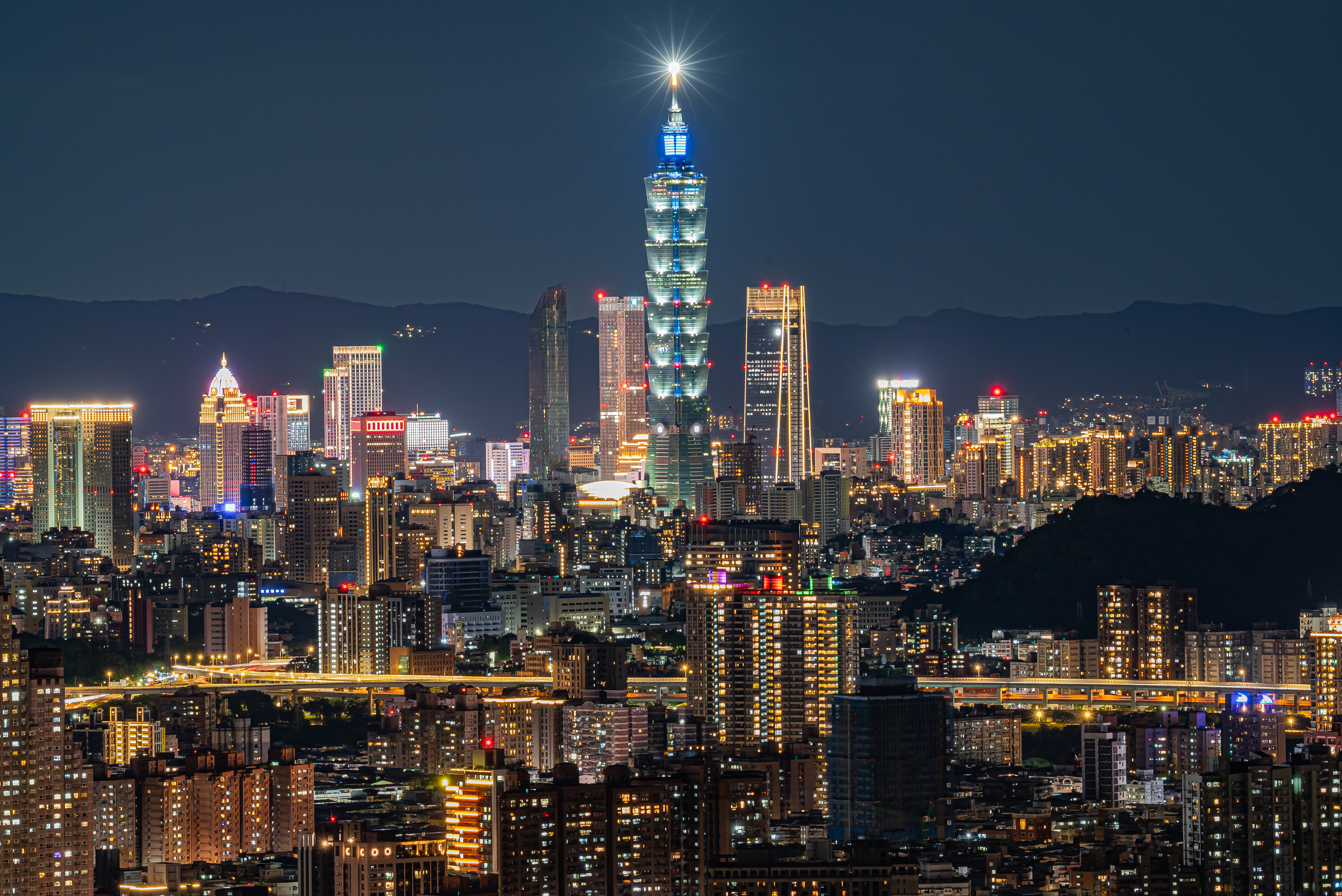
Taipei's CBD skyline, with Taipei 101 in the (Xinyi Special District)

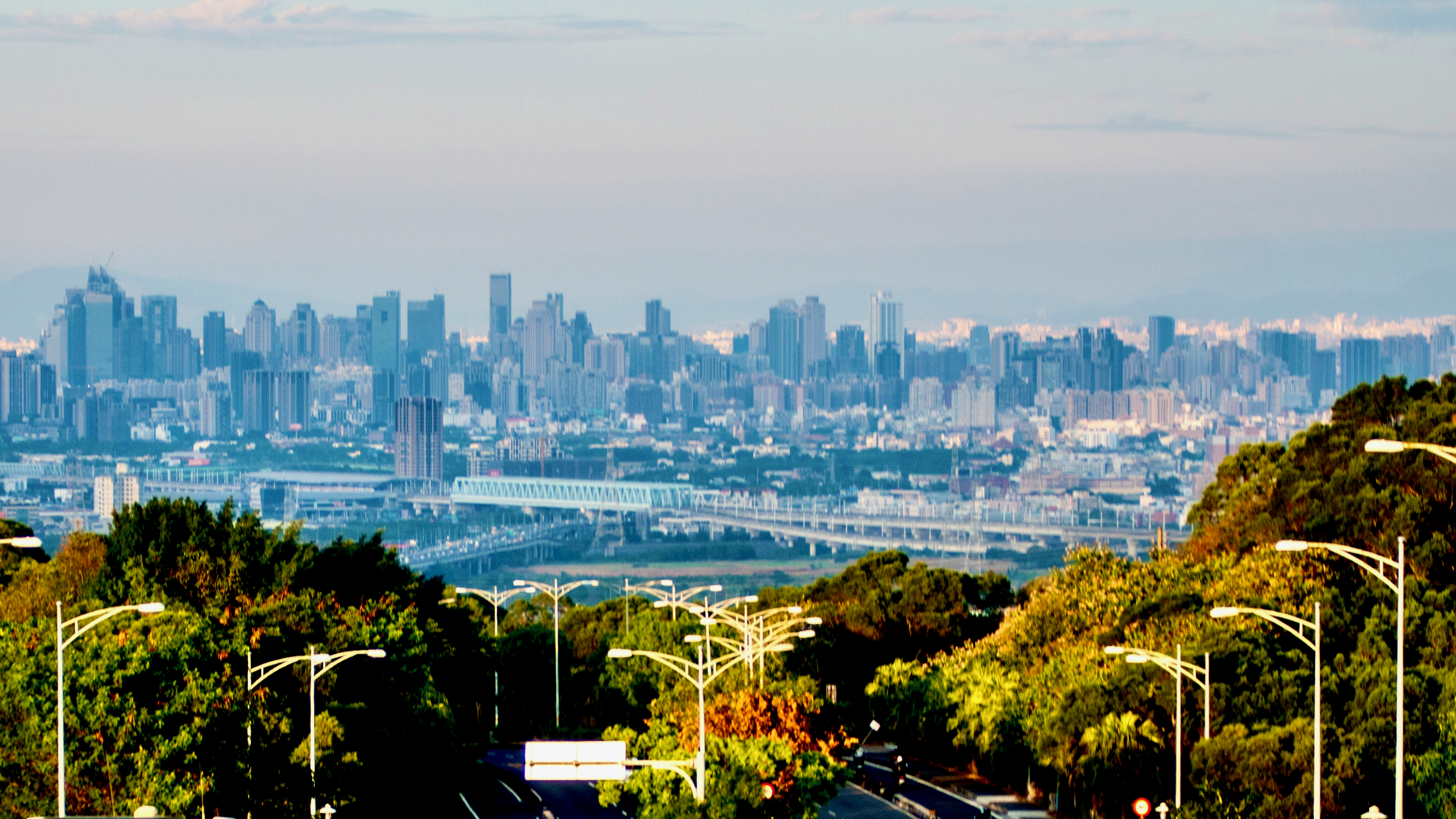
Taichung's 7th Redevelopment Zone is the main CBD of Taichung.

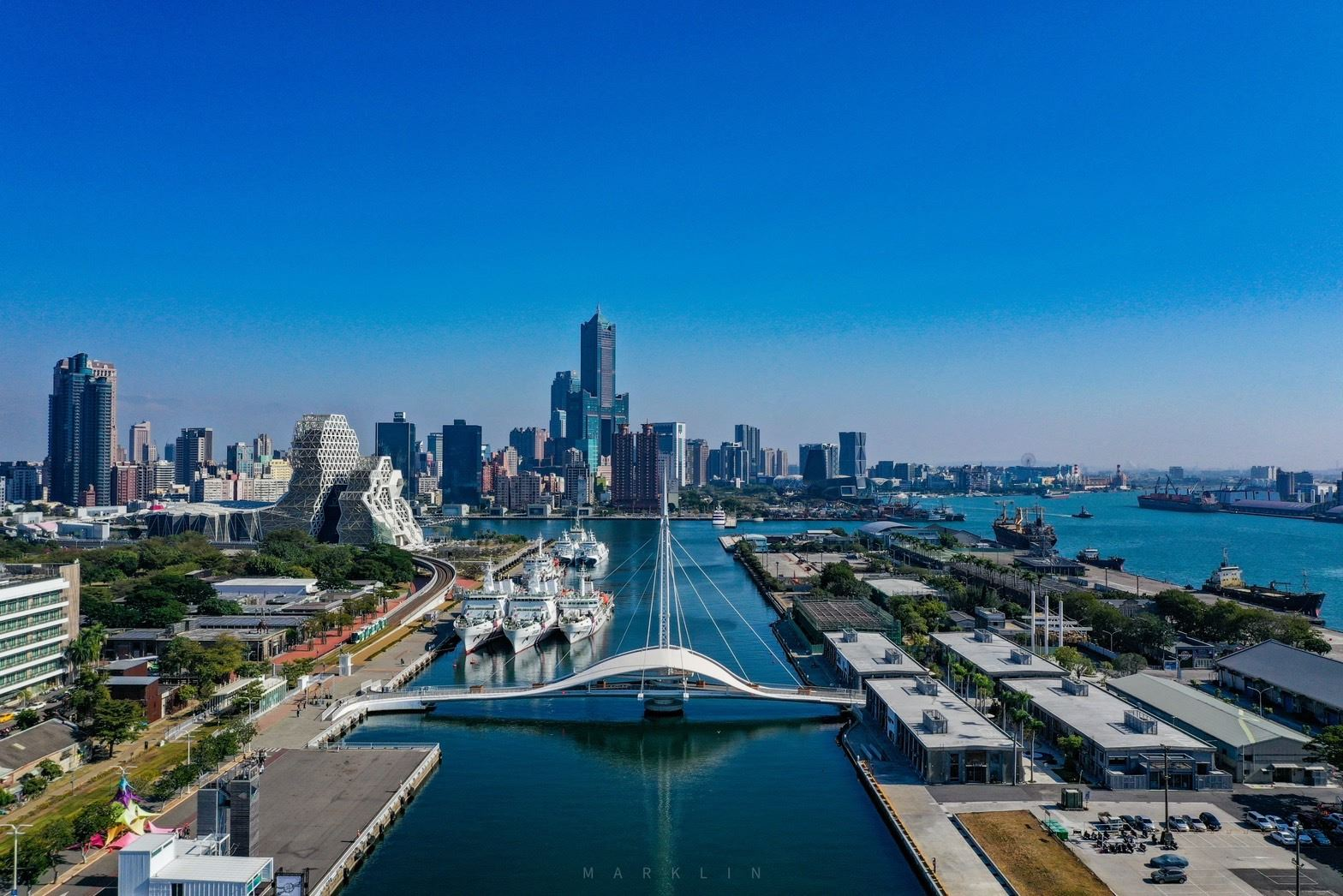
Asia New Bay Area is the main CBD of Kaohsiung.

== Turkey ==
In Turkey, Ankara became the nation's capital in the early 20th century, but Istanbul has remained the main economic center of the country. But a 262 hectare central business district is planned in Varlık, Altındağ.

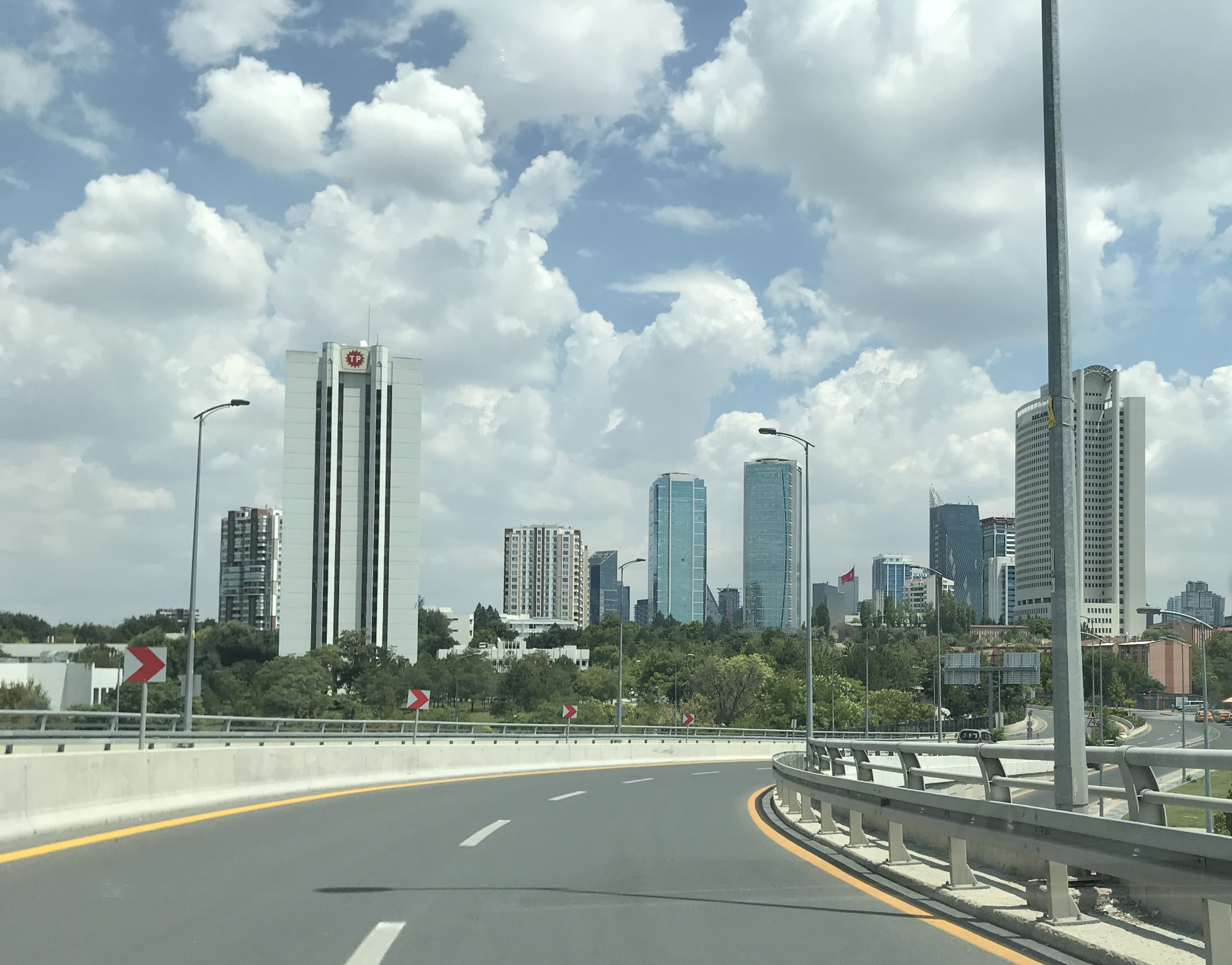
Söğütözü, Ankara

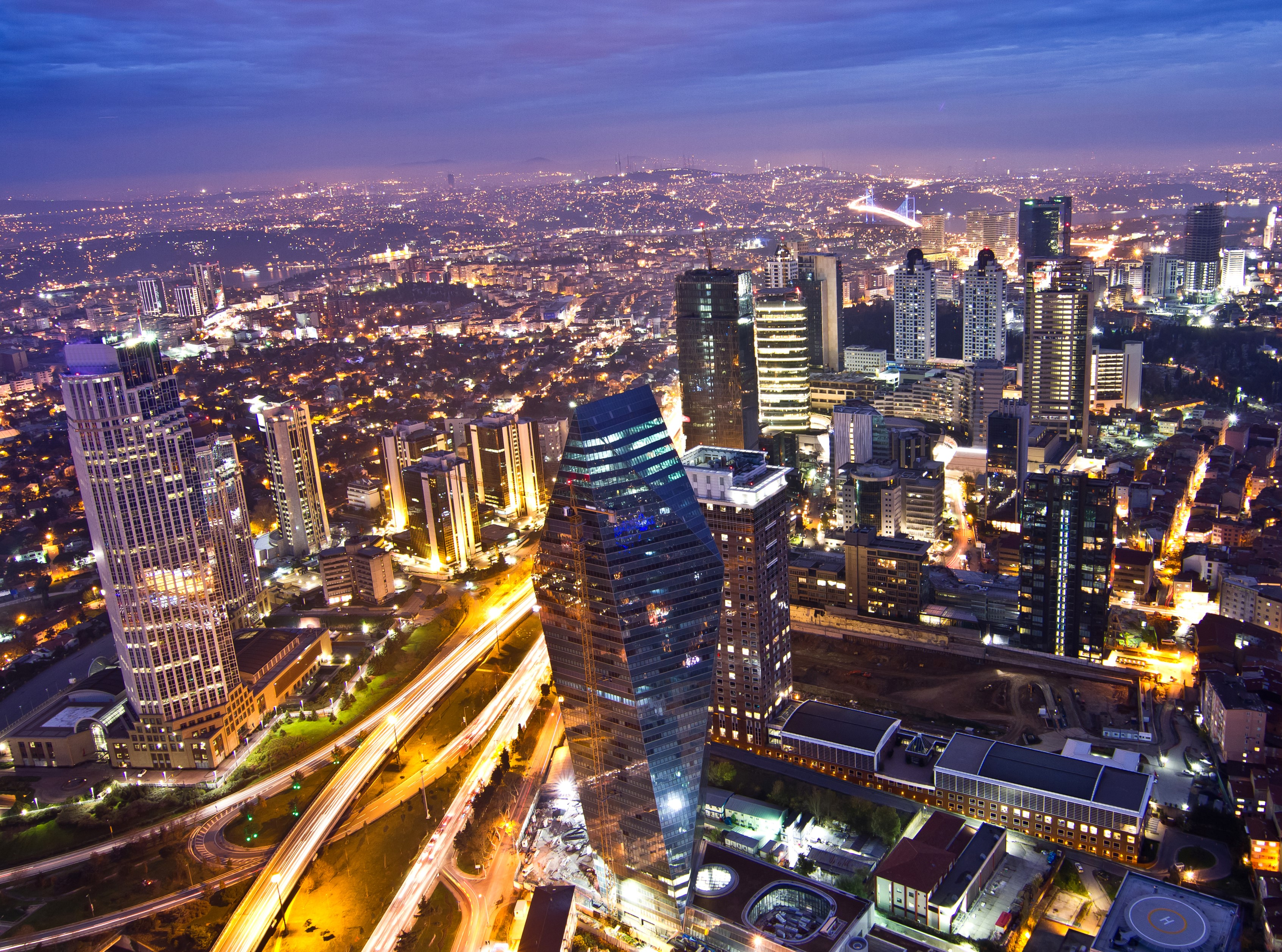
Levent business district in Istanbul at night

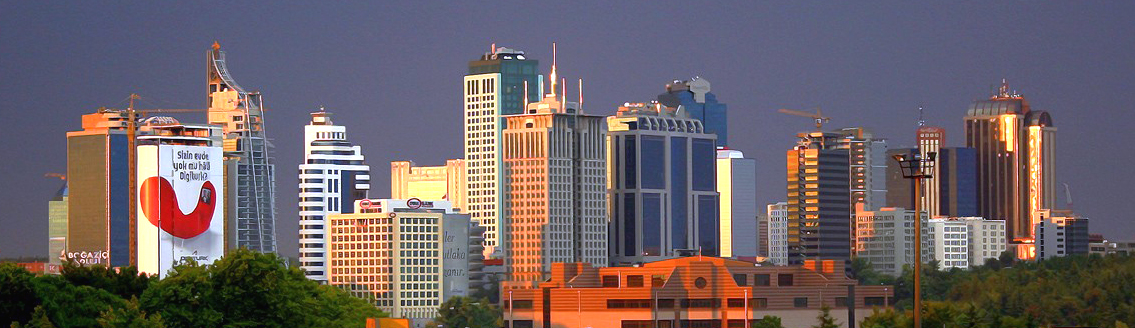
Maslak, Istanbul

== United Kingdom ==
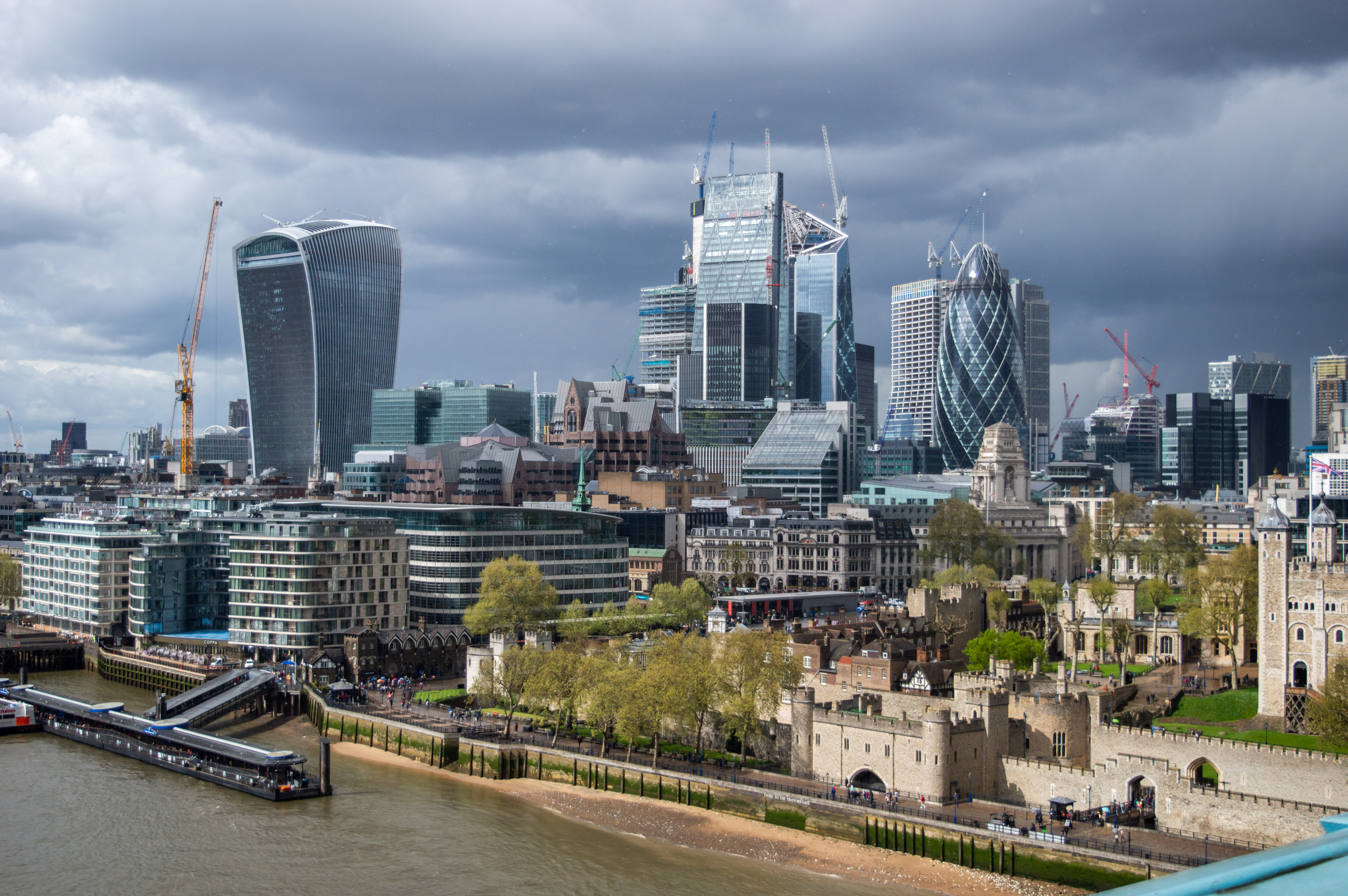
The City of London, as seen from Tower Bridge.

The City of London and Canary Wharf serve as not only England's, but the entire United Kingdom's largest CBDs (by economic output). The City has one of the largest concentrations of economic output in the world.

The City and Canary Wharf together house a significant number of the world's largest corporations. In the 2023 Fortune 500 Europe list, London had 44 companies, making up about 9% of the list's revenue. Specifically, Shell and BP are headquartered in London, with other notable companies like Unilever and GSK also being based there. Canary Wharf, a major financial district in London, is also home to many global financial institutions, including HSBC, Citigroup, Wells Fargo, Barclays, JPMorgan Chase, MetLife, Clifford Chance, and Morgan Stanley.

== See also ==
- Business improvement district
- Commercial area
- City center
- Downtown
- List of central business districts
- Main Street
