= List of South Korean retail companies =

This is a list of notable retailers based or operating in South Korea.

== Bookstores ==
- Kyobo Book Centre

== Cosmetics and skincare ==
- Amorepacific Corporation
- Banila Co.
- Ĭsa Knox
- Missha
- Skin Food
- Clio Cosmetics
- Nature Republic
- Olive Young
- 3CE
- Etude House
- Laneige
- Innisfree

== Convenience stores ==
- 7-Eleven
- CU
- GS25
- Ministop

== Department stores ==
- GS Square
- Hyundai Department Store
- Lotte Department Store
- Shinsegae

== Discount retailers ==
- 2001 Outlet
- Costco
- E-Mart
- Hi-Living
- Home plus
- Lotte Mart

== Electronics store ==
- Hi-Mart

== Fashion and luxury ==
- Blue Elephant
- Fila
- MCM
- Style Nanda

== Online stores ==
- Kmall24
- G-Market
- Inter Park
- Coupang

== See also ==
- List of South Korean companies
- Korean online fashion retailers
- List of markets in South Korea
- Economy of South Korea
