= BB cream =

Type of cosmetic

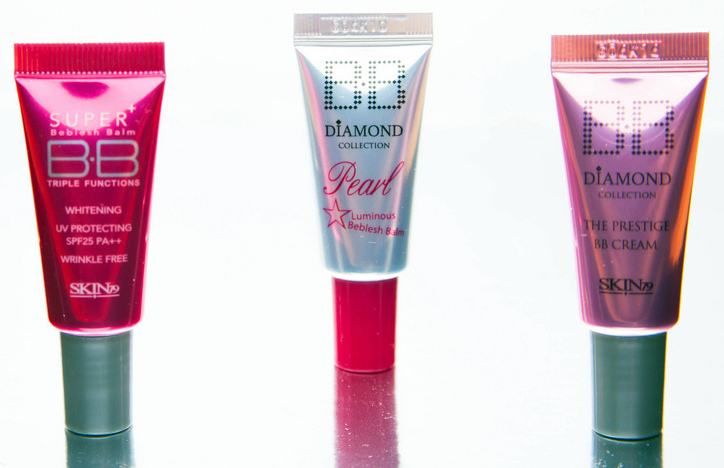
- Selection of BB creams
- Origins: Christine Schrammek, German dermatologist, in the 1960s; developed further in the 1980s by Korean cosmetics companies
- Description: All-in-one facial cosmetic product to replace serum, moisturizer, primer, foundation and sunblock
- Main markets: South Korean and Japanese markets from 1985; Western markets from 2012

BB cream is a marketing term that stands for blemish balm, blemish base, and in Western markets, beauty balm, beauty blend... Products marketed as BB creams are generally designed to serve as a foundation, moisturizer, and sunscreen all at once.

The "CC cream" was formulated later in South Korea and sometimes stands for Color Correction cream. Products marketed as CC creams claim to serve the same function as BB creams, with greater emphasis on homogenizing skin color. Differences between BB creams and CC creams vary from brand to brand.

== History ==
What became BB cream was originally formulated in the 1960s in Germany by dermatologist Dr. Christine Schrammek to protect her patients' skin after facial peels and surgery. It was further developed and innovated for daily commercial use in South Korea in the 1980s, popularized by beauty trends in South Korea and later spread across the globe.

== Formulations ==
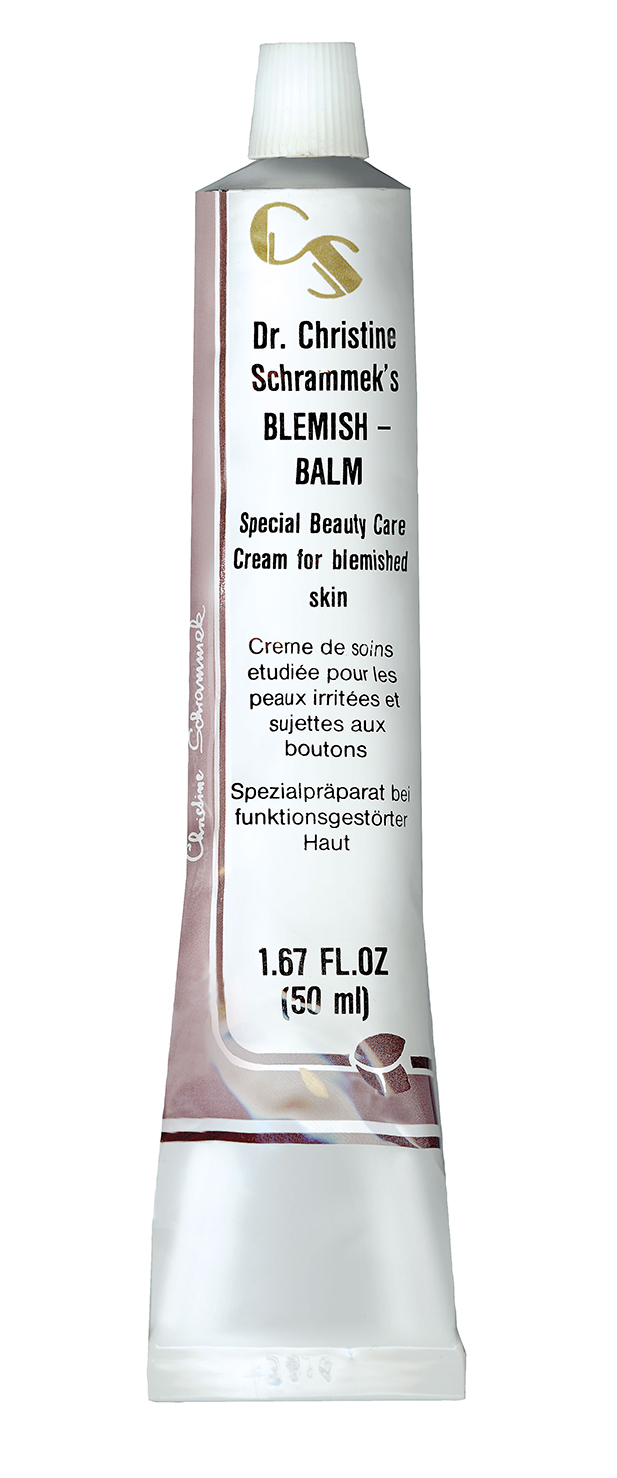
Christine Schrammek Blemish Balm from 1960s

BB creams come in a variety of different formulations. Because Korean companies focused initially on the Korean and East Asian markets, they are offered in a limited number of hues. Instead of offering multiple shades for different skin colors, most formulae are designed to oxidize to match the user's skin tone. The skin-brightening properties of the cream, not to be confused with skin lightening or bleaching, as sold in the Asian market are an important element in its popularity.

The cream is promoted as a multi-tasker and all-in-one treatment, but Korean women mostly use it as an alternative to foundation, particularly those with Western formulations that tend to be too heavy for their tastes. The coverage is often mineral-based, and is intended to both cover and treat blemishes such as acne, sun spots, and age spots. Some brands claim anti-wrinkle, anti-inflammatory, and soothing effects for their products. Several contain hyaluronic acid and vitamin C.

== Markets ==
BB creams made up 13 percent of the cosmetics market in South Korea in 2011. Some Korean brands also offer BB creams for men. Notable Korean brands include Etude House, HIDEHERE, Missha, Nature Republic, Skin Food, Sulhwasoo, The Face Shop, SKIN79, Innisfree, Banila Co. and CLIO.

Western cosmetics companies began to launch BB creams in the Western market in 2012, though some of these creams have been criticized for lacking the skin-caring functions that BB creams normally have, and for being no more than tinted moisturizer. Early arrivals included Boscia, Clinique, Dior, Estée Lauder, Garnier, Marcelle, Maybelline, Revlon and Smashbox. Lab Series makes a BB cream for men. Certain BB creams have been tailored for Western markets: Estée Lauder, for example, has not included the brightening properties in their formulation for North America.

== Cruelty-free and vegan BB creams ==
BB creams advertised as cruelty-free include Smashbox (owned by Estée Lauder) and The Body Shop (owned by Natura & Co). The definition of "cruelty-free" varies. The Body Shop BB cream is certified by the Leaping Bunny Program, which means, according to the certification process, that no new animal testing has been used in any phase of product development by the company, its laboratories, or the suppliers of its ingredients. As of May 2013, Amore Pacific, which has as its subsidiaries Etude House and Laneige, has ended animal testing on all ingredients and cosmetics.

Products certified as cruelty-free may still contain animal products and may not be suitable for vegans. Vegan BB creams include the Superdrug own brand BB cream, BB cream souffles from Haut Cosmetics, 100% Pure Cosmetics, Multi-Mineral BB Cream from Pacifica, and the Evenly Radiant BB Crème from Dermae.

== See also ==
- DD cream
