= Shopping in Seoul =

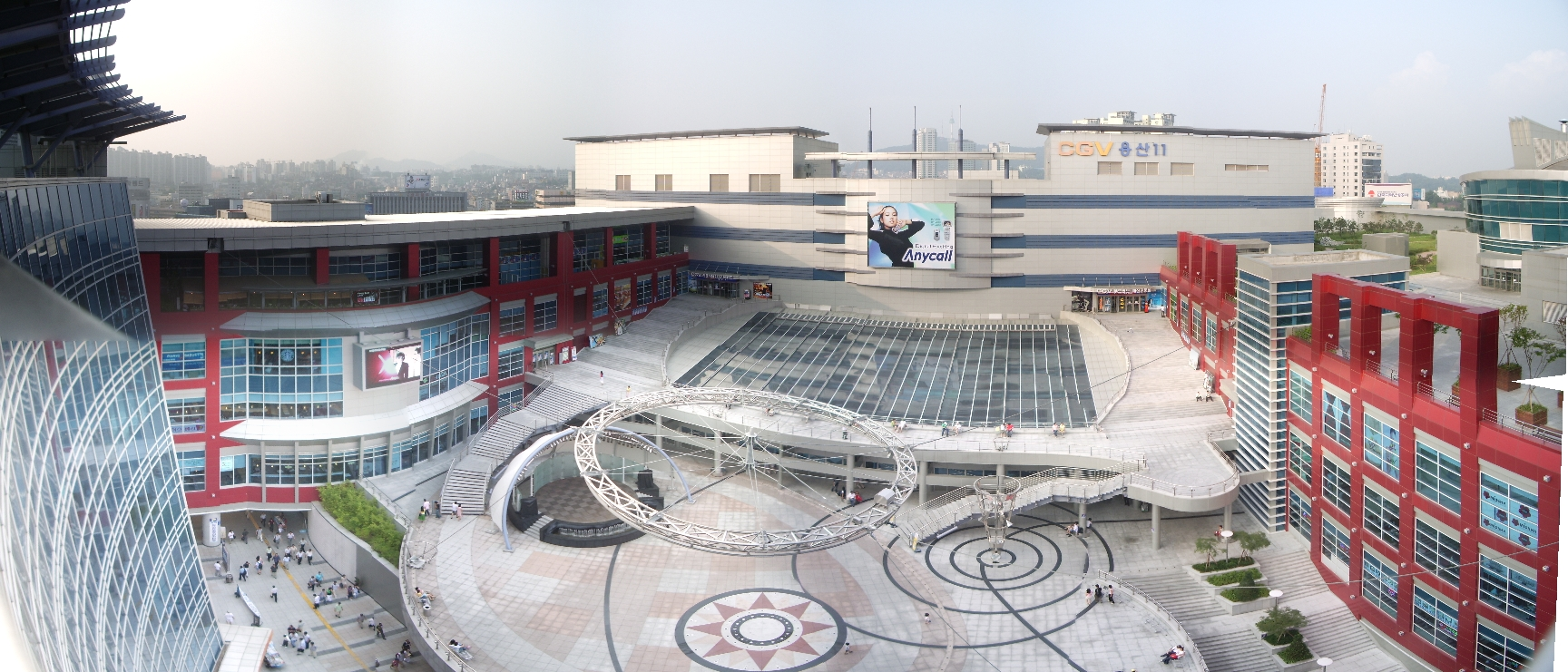
Yongsan I'park Mall

Seoul, the capital of South Korea, has many shopping areas and markets throughout the city. Famous ones include Myeong-dong, Cheongdam-dong, the Hongdae area, and the Dongdaemun and Namdaemun markets.

== Traditional markets ==
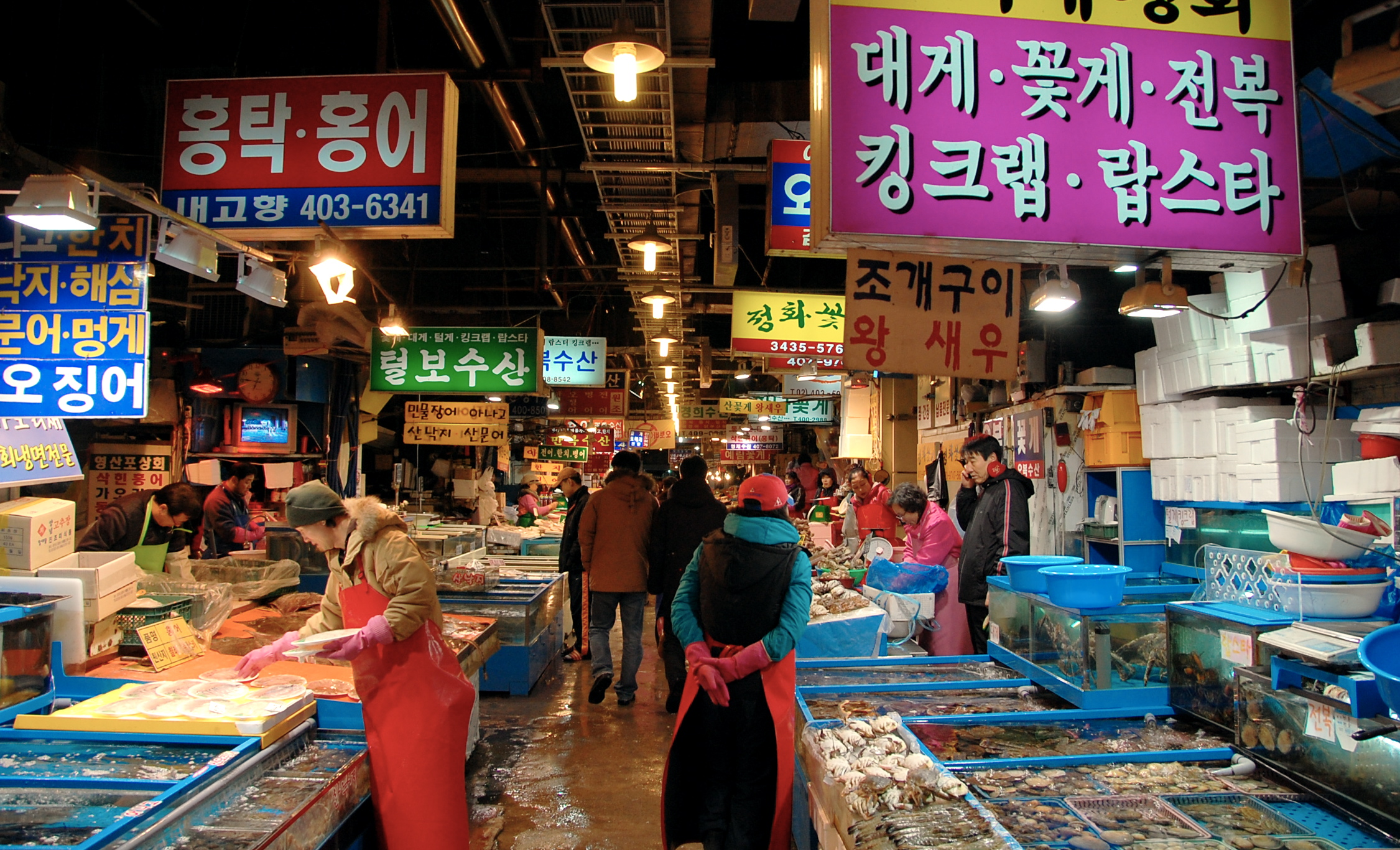
Garak Fish Market

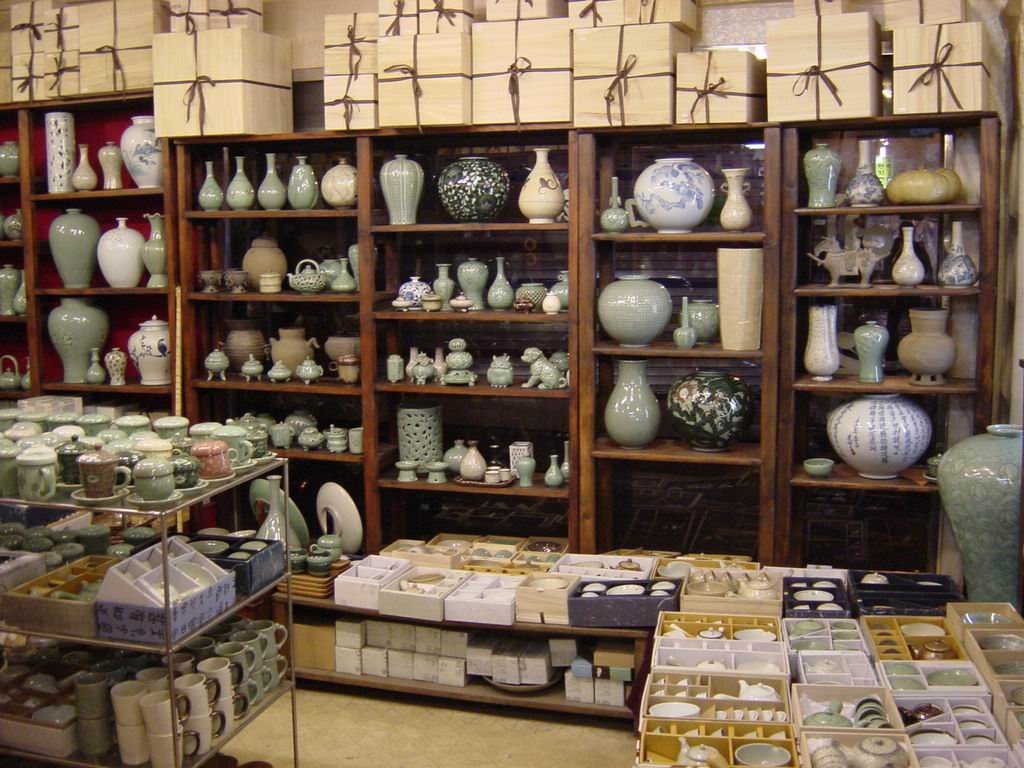
A traditional porcelain store in Insa-dong

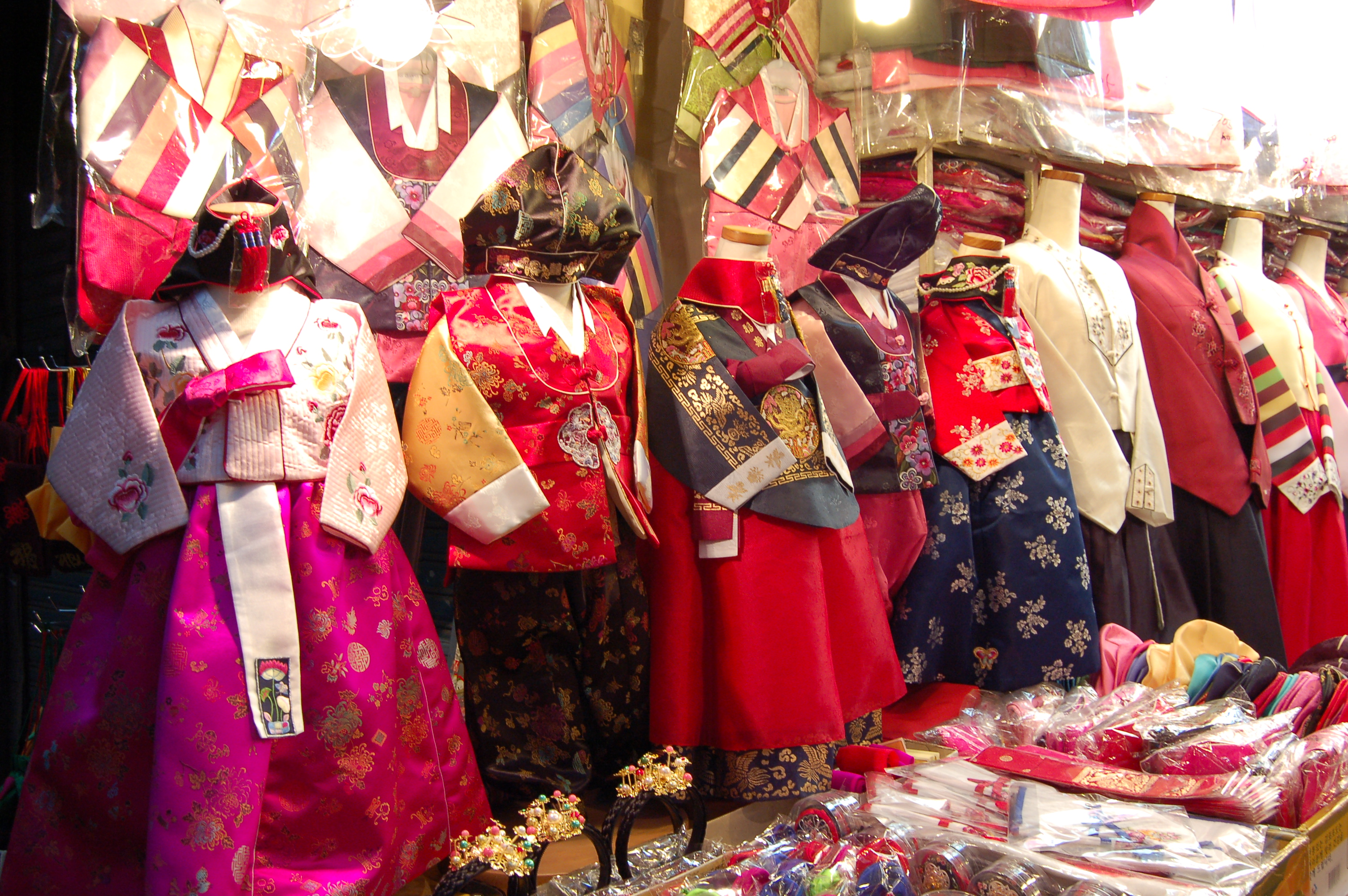
Hanbok for sale in Hanbok shop in Dongdaemun Market

- Namdaemun Market (남산시장) is the oldest and one of the largest markets in the city.
- Dongdaemun Market (동대문시장) is another large market. Near to it are several large mall complexes that specialize in fashion, including Migliore, Hello APM, and Doota.
- Gwangjang Market (광장시장) is located in the Jongno District, and is known for the pancake-like food bindae-tteok, as well as mayak gimbap. The market is accessible by either Jongno 5-ga, or Euljiro 4-ga metro station.

One of the most notable shopping areas in the city is Myeong-dong.

Insa-dong is a narrow street known for its antique stores, traditional teahouses art galleries. Other markets include the Hwanghak-dong Flea Market (황학동 벼룩시장), Gyeongdong Market (광동시장) for oriental medicine, Changanpyeong Antique Market and the fish markets Noryangjin Fisheries Wholesale Market (노량진 수상시장) and Garak Market (가락시장).

Itaewon is another notable shopping area in the city lined with boutiques and stores especially targeted at the large foreign population in Seoul. The area contains tailors, leather and shoes stores, and antiques such as brassware and jewelry and specialist shops dealing in Korean art and calligraphy. Access to Itaewon is from Itaewon Station, Insa-dong from Anguk station, and Sinchon from Sinchon station, Hongik University station and Ewha Woman's University station (the former of which should not be confused with Jamsilsaenae station on the opposite side of Seoul.

Hongdae is also home to independent clothing stalls, discount and vintage shops, especially along the main thoroughfare of Eoulmadang-ro. The Hongdae Playground, also known as Hongik Children's Park, located between Wausan-ro and Wausan-ro 21-gil opposite Hongik University is home to street vendors who sell their wares in the evenings. On weekends, from March to November at 13:00 to 18:00, flea markets are held on Hongdae Playground (놀이터) that is in front of the main gate of Hongik University. The flea markets are called "Free Market" on Saturdays and "Hope Market" on Sundays.

Apgujeong (Apgujeong Station), Cheongdam-dong (Cheongdam station) and Gangnam (Gangnam station) areas are also well known shopping destinations. COEX mall in the area is also popular and also contains one of the largest aquariums in Asia, accessible from Samseong station.

The 760-meter-long section of main street Apgujeong-ro in Cheongdam-dong, that runs from Apgujeongrodeo station at Galleria Department Store to Cheongdam crossroad, has been dubbed the 'Cheongdam Fashion Street' or 'Cheongdamdong Street of Luxury Goods'. It is lined with stores of luxury brands, such as Cartier's first flagship store in South Korea, named Cartier Maison, MCM Haus flagship store, 10 Corso Como, Ermenegildo Zegna, Salvatore Ferragamo, Louis Vuitton, Prada, Burberry; as well as outlets for 3.1 Phillip Lim, Martin Margiela and Tory Burch and Korean designer Son Jung-wan. The area is also home to Vera Wang's first Asian flagship store 'Vera Wang Bridal Korea'.

== Specialty stores ==
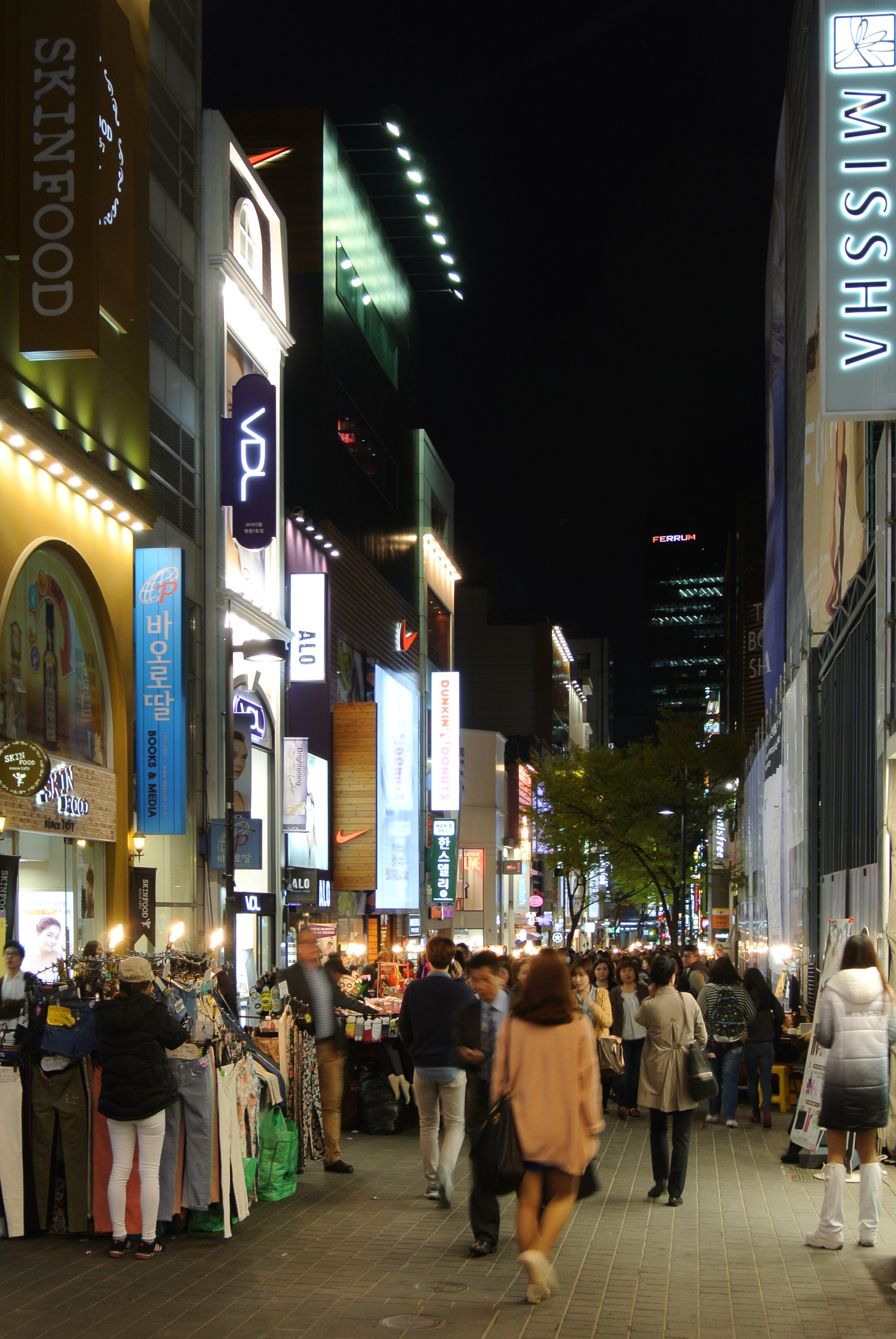
Myeong-dong at night, Missha store on the right

The Yongsan Electronics Market of Seoul is the largest electronics market in Asia. The market specializes in electronic goods as well as computer parts, of which South Korea is a major world producer of and it contains approximately 5,000 stores housed in 22 buildings. This area can be accessed via Yongsan Station or Sinyongsan Station. Techno Mart in Gwangjin-gu is a large mall specializing in electronic and computer goods, accessible directly from Gangbyeon station. There is also an electronic shopping centre located in Seocho-dong, Seocho-gu, accessible from exit 3 Nambu Bus Terminal station.

Cosmetics and skincare

- Amorepacific Corporation: Etude House, Laneige, Innisfree, IOPE, Mamonde and Laneige Homme
- Ĭsa Knox
- Missha
- Skin Food
- The Face Shop
- Nature Republic
- CLIO
- TONYMOLY

== Shopping mall ==
- Lotte World Mall
- Star City Mall
- Starfield COEX Mall

== See also ==
- List of South Korean retail companies
