= List of Korean online fashion retailers =

This is a list of Korean and non-Korean online retailers who sell Korean fashion items. The list does not include websites of Korean fashion brands that sell their products through their own online stores. For a list of major Korean fashion brands, see Fashion in South Korea.

== Korean online general retailers ==
The following is a list of Korean online retailers, dealing with a wide variety of retail items, including fashion items.

- Kmall24
- G-Market
- Inter Park

== Korean online fashion retailers ==
The following is a list of Korean online retailers, selling exclusively fashion items.

- Blue Elephant
- Kakao Style
- Stylenanda

== Non-Korean online retailers ==
This list includes online fashion retailers which are not located in Korea.

These webpages sell Korean-Fashion, K-Beauty products as well as K-Fashion inspired products.

- YesStyle

== See also ==
- Fashion in South Korea
- Shopping in Seoul
- List of South Korean retail companies
- List of Korean clothing
