= GS25 =

South Korean convenience store chain

- Native name: 지에스25
- Formerly: LG25 (1990–2005)
- Type: Subsidiary
- Industry: Convenience stores
- Founded: 1990 (36 years ago)
- Headquarters: GS Tower, 508 Nonhyeon-ro, Gangnam-gu, Seoul, South Korea, 06141
- Number of locations: 18,112 (as of end of 2024)
- Areas served: South Korea; Vietnam; Mongolia
- Key people: Yeon-soo Huh (NED)
- Parent: GS Retail

GS25 (Korean: 지에스25) is a South Korean chain of convenience stores operated and owned by GS Retail, a subsidiary company of the GS Group. The headquarters of the company are located at the GS Tower in Gangnam-gu, Seoul. As of June 9, 2020, GS25 operates 13,899 stores. In addition, by the end of 2024, the number of GS25 stores nationwide had increased to 18,112.

GS25 is known for having hundreds of locations all over South Korea. They are also known for their large variety of drinks such as different flavored milks and iced beverages. They also carry a variety of Korean snacks as well as ramen, fish cakes, and kimbabs. GS25 also provides products (PB products) developed on their own, as well as a variety of foods.

== History ==
Logo used from 2005 to 2019

GS25, then known as LG25, opened their first store in Dongdaemun-gu, Seoul, in 1990. However, in 2005, GS Group split from the LG Corporation, the name of LG25 was correspondingly changed to GS25. In March 2019, GS25 changed their brand identity for the first time since changing their name to GS25. With the new identity, a new slogan of "Lifestyle Platform" began to be applied to all new store signage. However, as of August 2019, most stores still use the former identity.

In the late 2010s and early 2020s, services such as delivery, apps, and membership were expanded.

== Foreign operations ==
=== Vietnam ===
In January 2018, GS25 ventured outside of South Korea for the first time in its history by launching a store in Ho Chi Minh City. As of January 2024, GS25 operates 245 stores throughout Vietnam.

=== Mongolia ===
Through a collaborative investment between the Shunkhlai Group and GS Retail, Digital Concept was established, securing the master franchise rights for the renowned GS25 brand. On May 18, 2021, GS25 officially opened in Mongolia with three stores in Ulaanbaatar. As of April 27, 2023, the company has opened 2 stores in Darkhan, the second-largest city in Mongolia. Two years after its establishment, Digital Concept LLC achieved a prominent position as one of Mongolia's "TOP 100 Companies" and expanded its retail presence from over 200 stores, with plans to reach 300. As of December 11, 2025, GS25 has opened 258 stores throughout Mongolia, with 251 in Ulaanbaatar.

=== Malaysia ===
Malaysia-based KK Super Mart has announced partnering with GS Retail to launch GS25 in Malaysia following the trend of Korean convenience stores, while both CU and e-mart24 have already arrived in the country. The first outlet was set to be launched in 2023 while targeting to launch 500 outlets within five years.

However, it failed to sign a contract in early 2023 due to frequent conflicts with KK group, who then terminated the contract.

== See also ==
- List of South Korean retail companies
- GS the Fresh
