= Gwangjang Market =

Street market in Seoul, South Korea

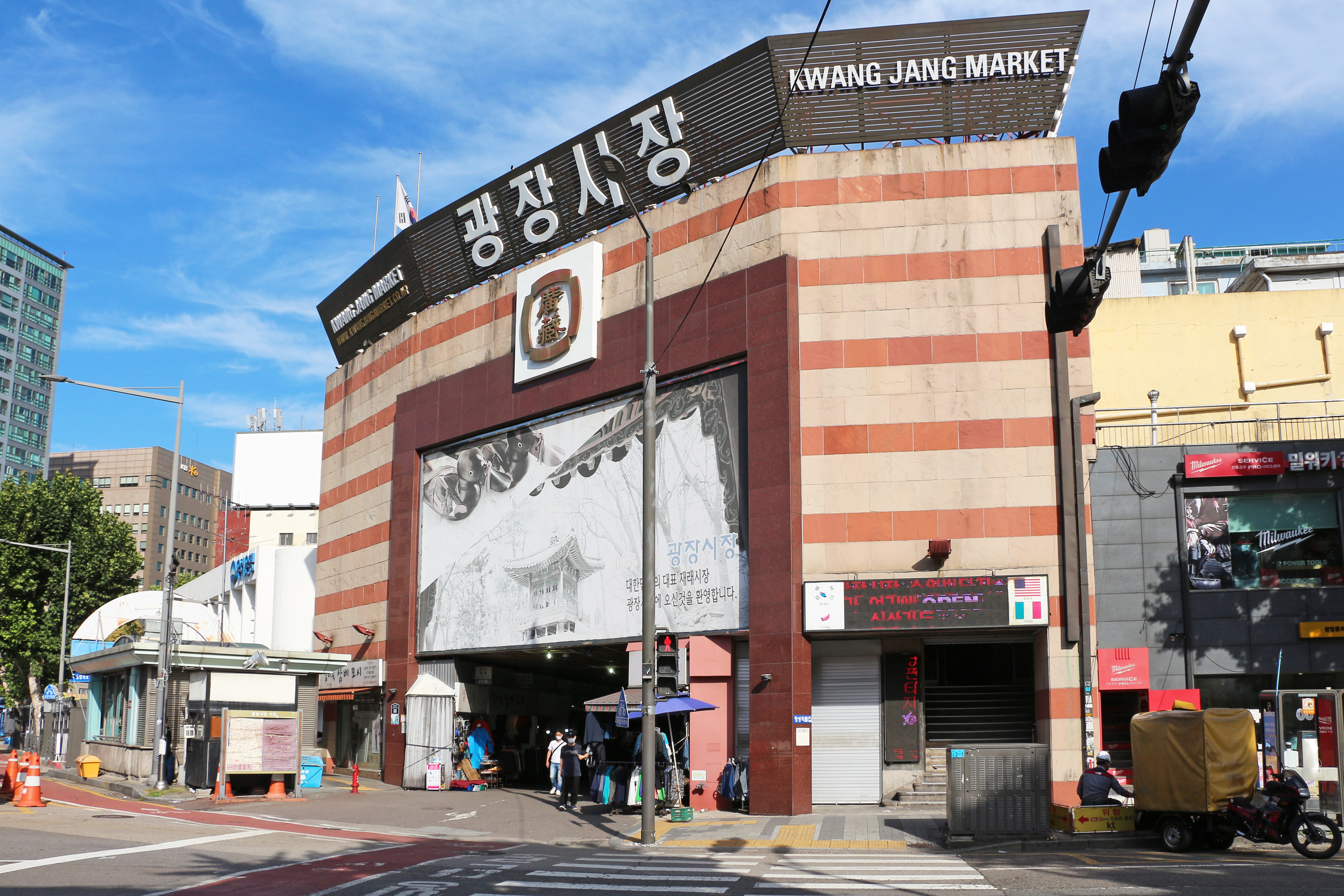
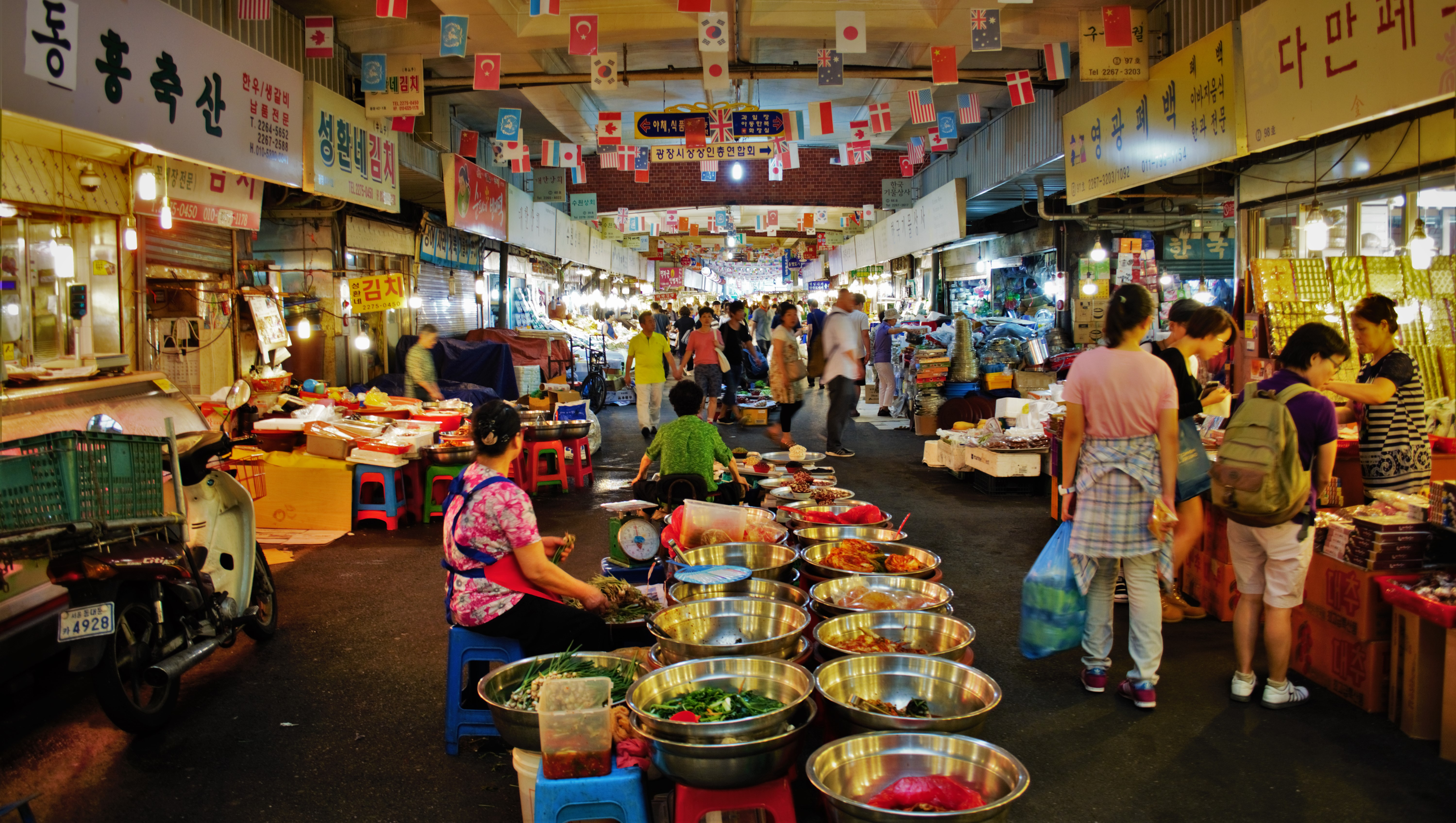
- Exterior and interior of market

General information
- Location: 88 Changgyeonggung-ro, Jongno District, Seoul, South Korea
- Coordinates: 37.570°N 126.999°E

Technical details
- Floor area: 42,000 m^{2} (450,000 ft^{2})

Other information
- Number of stores: 5,000
- Public transit: Jongno 5-ga; Euljiro 4-ga

Website
- www.kwangjangmarket.co.kr/en/

Korean name
- Hangul: 광장시장
- Hanja: 廣藏市場
- RR: Gwangjang sijang
- MR: Kwangjang sijang

Gwangjang Market (Korean: 광장시장), previously Dongdaemun Market (동대문시장), is a traditional street market in Jongno District, Seoul, South Korea. The market is one of the oldest and largest traditional markets in South Korea, with more than 5000 shops and 20,000 employees in an area of 42,000 m^{2} (450,000 ft^{2}). Approximately 65,000 people visit the market each day.

The market association that manages the market is among the oldest active companies in South Korea, having been founded in 1911.

== History ==
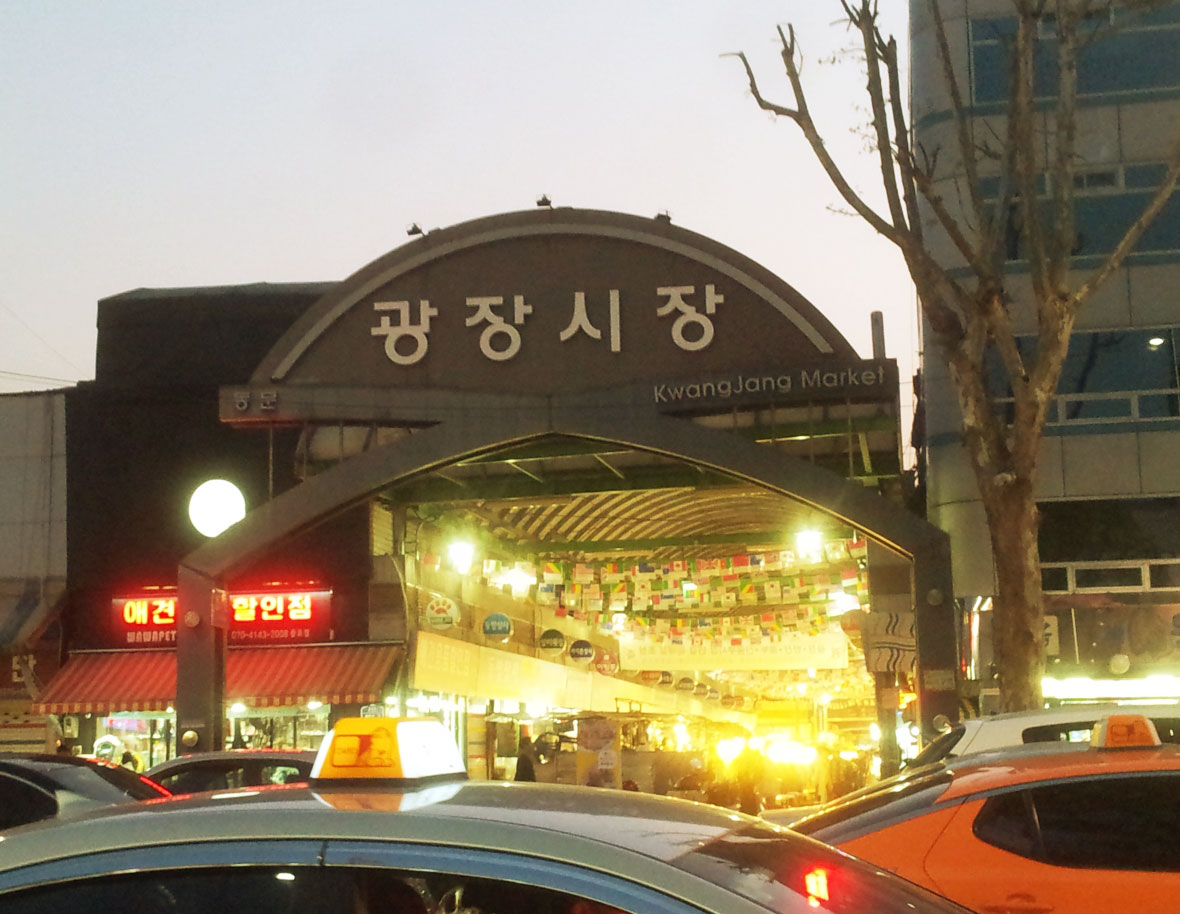
Exterior view of Gwangjang Market

The Gabo Reforms, which were introduced during the Joseon period, eliminated the merchant monopolies that existed in Joseon at the time by allowing anyone to engage in commercial activities. The licensed merchants and shop owners in Seoul lost much of their business to competition as a result of these reforms, so King Gojong created a warehouse market called Changnaejang, which eventually developed into Namdaemun Market. After the signing of the Eulsa Treaty in 1905, when Korea was under Japanese colonial occupation, the Japanese took control of Namdaemun Market. In reaction to the seizure of Namdaemun Market, a group of private Korean investors, including wealthy merchants, decided to create a new market that was not under the control of the Japanese. They combined funds to create the Gwangjang Corporation on 5 July 1905, and purchased the land for the market with 100,000 won. They used the pre-existing Bae O Gae Market (배오개시장), a morning market in the area, as the foundation for their new market, which they named Dongdaemun Market (동대문시장). At the time, most markets were temporary and open only occasionally, so Dongdaemun Market became the first permanent market to be open every day of the week. The market was renamed Gwangjang Market in 1960.

== Name ==
Gwangjang Market was originally the name of a single, 3,000-pyeong (9,900 m^{2}) shopping center in the center of Dongdaemun Market, which was built between 1957 and 1959. The name comes from the two bridges it was built between: Gwangkyo (광교; meaning "wide bridge") and Jangkyo (장교; meaning "long bridge").

== Products ==
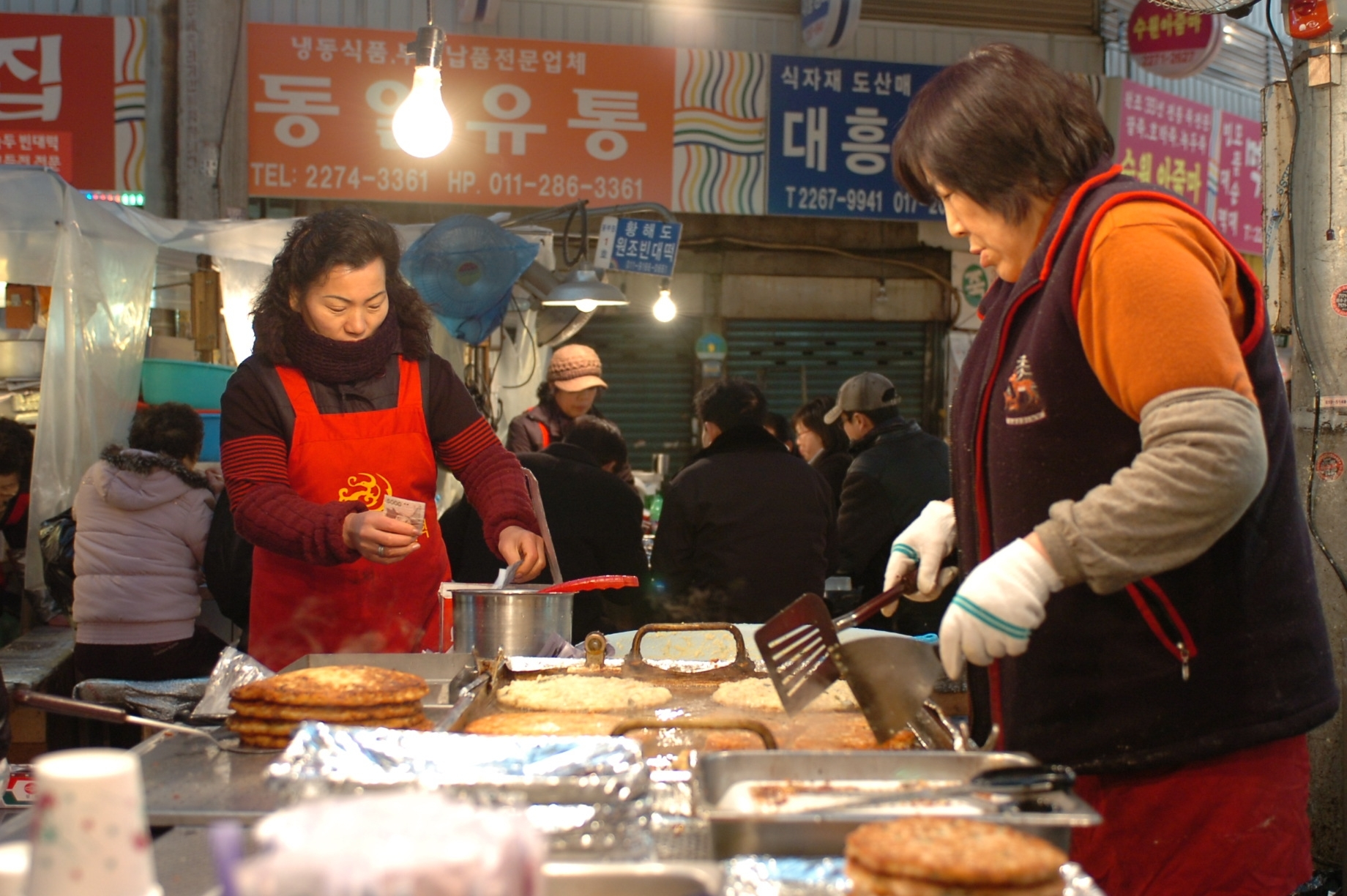
Market vendors frying bindaetteok

In the early years the market only sold agricultural and seafood products, but as it became one of the largest markets in Korea, it began to sell many other products. Today the market has approximately 1500–2000 vendors selling fruit, vegetables, meat, fish, bread, street food, clothing, textiles, handicrafts, kitchenware, souvenirs, and Korean traditional medicinal items. There are also many restaurants and food stalls selling traditional Korean cuisine, but the market is most famous for its bindaetteok, or mung bean pancakes, and mayak gimbap.

== Location ==
The market is accessible from Jongno 5-ga or Euljiro 4-ga metro station.

== In popular culture ==
- A 2014 episode of Running Man was partially filmed in the market. The cast stopped at various food stalls and had to choose the correct card after finishing their food to continue the race.
- The premiere of The Amazing Race Australia 4 featured a 'Detour' task at the market in which teams that chose this task had to roll, fill, and fold 50 dumplings.
- Gwangjang Market and its street foods (Kal-guksu, Gejang and Bindae-tteok) were featured on the Netflix TV series, Street Food (TV series) in the Seoul, South Korea episode.

== Gallery ==
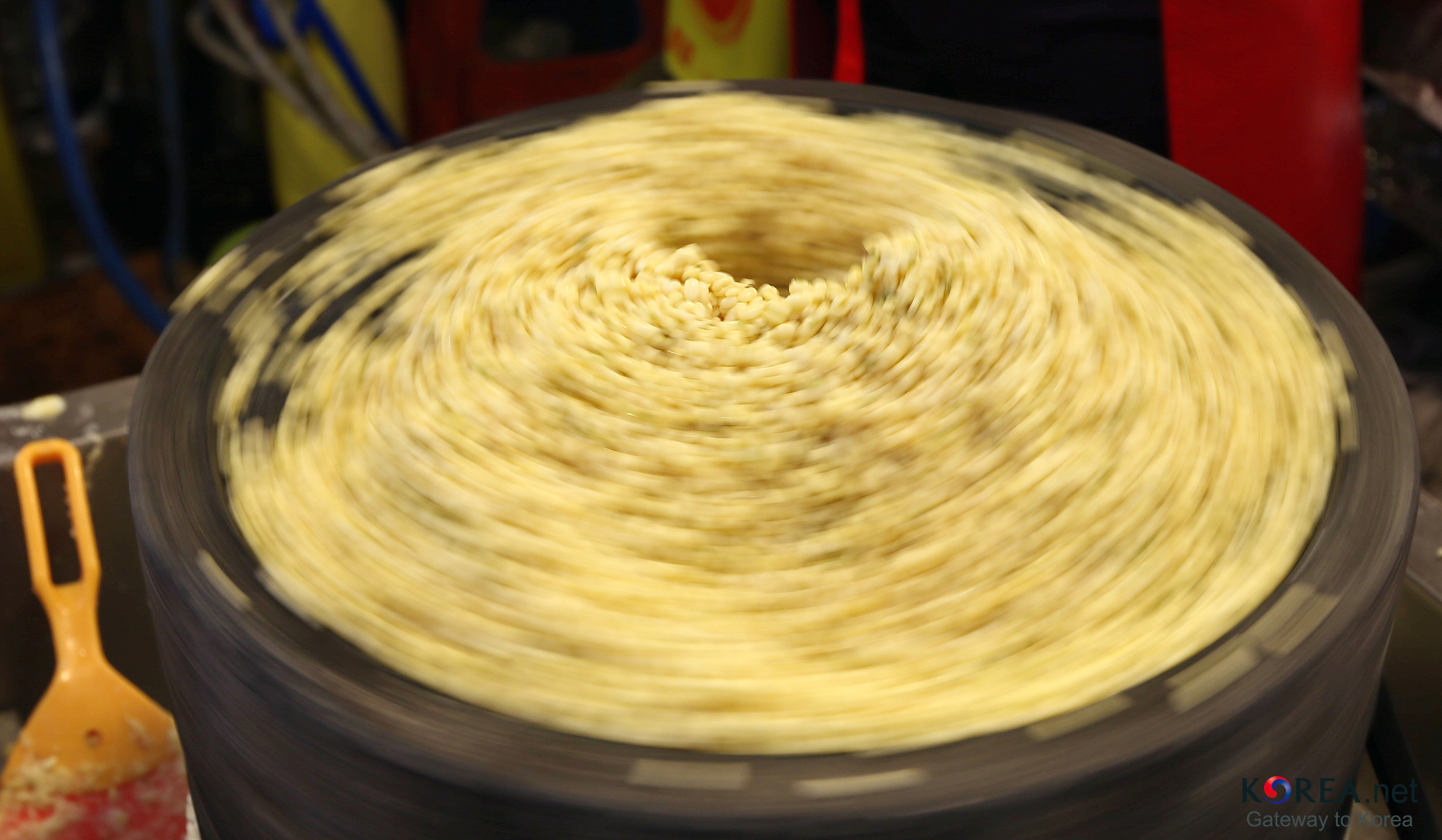
Mung beans being ground to make bindaetteok

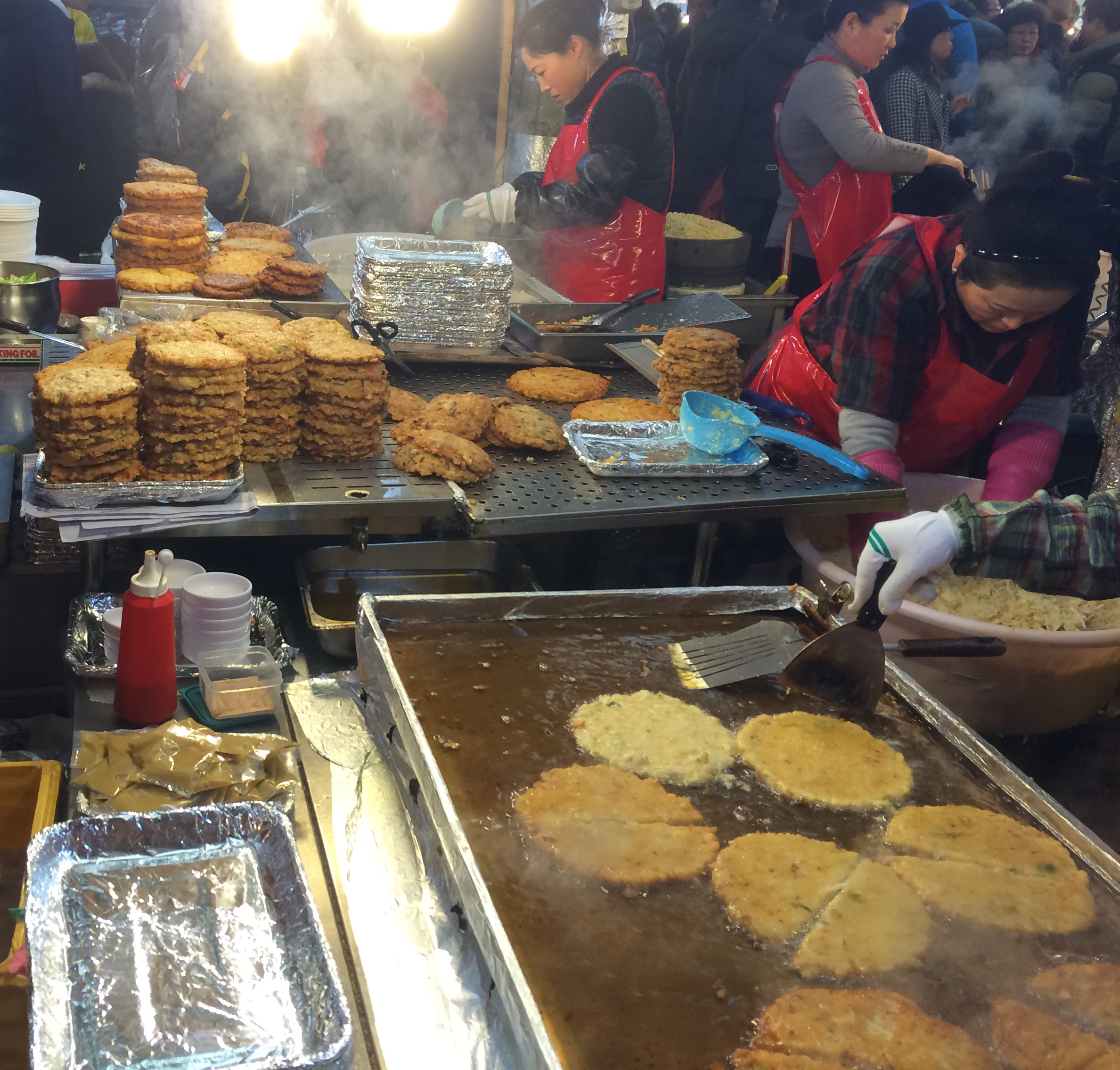
Vendors frying bindaetteok

jeon vendor

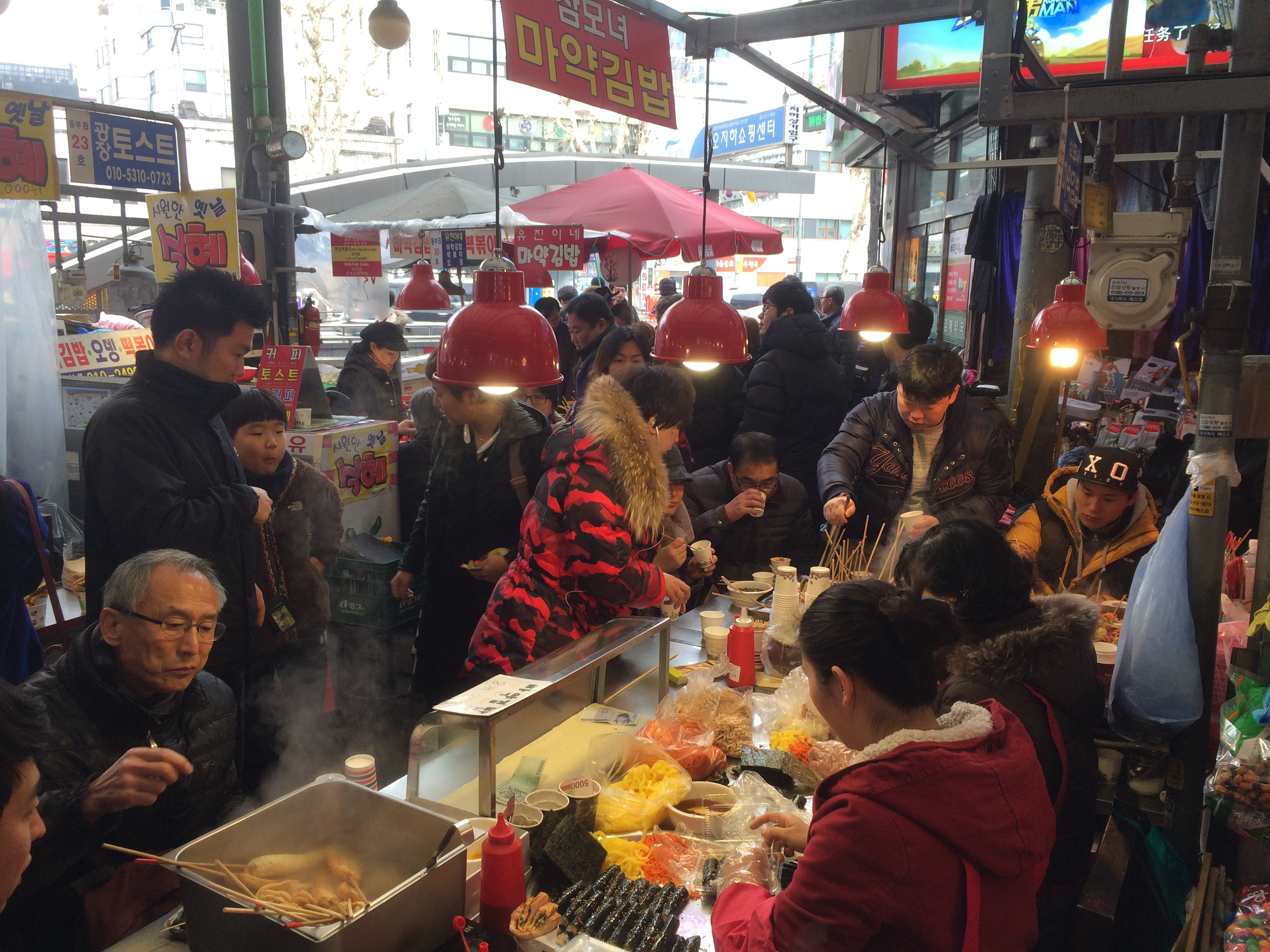
Vendors making mayak kimbap

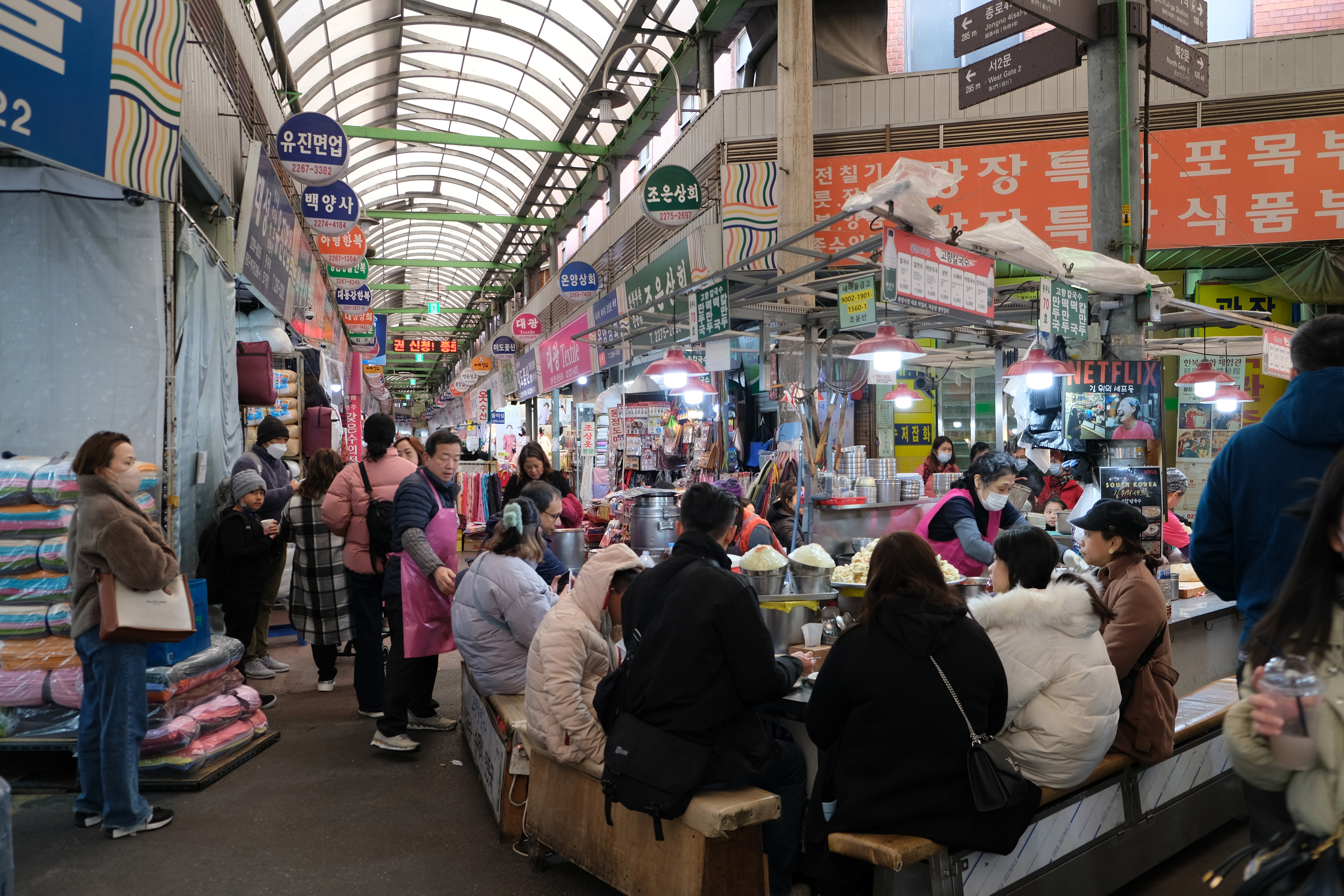
Interior of the restaurant area of Gwangjang Market

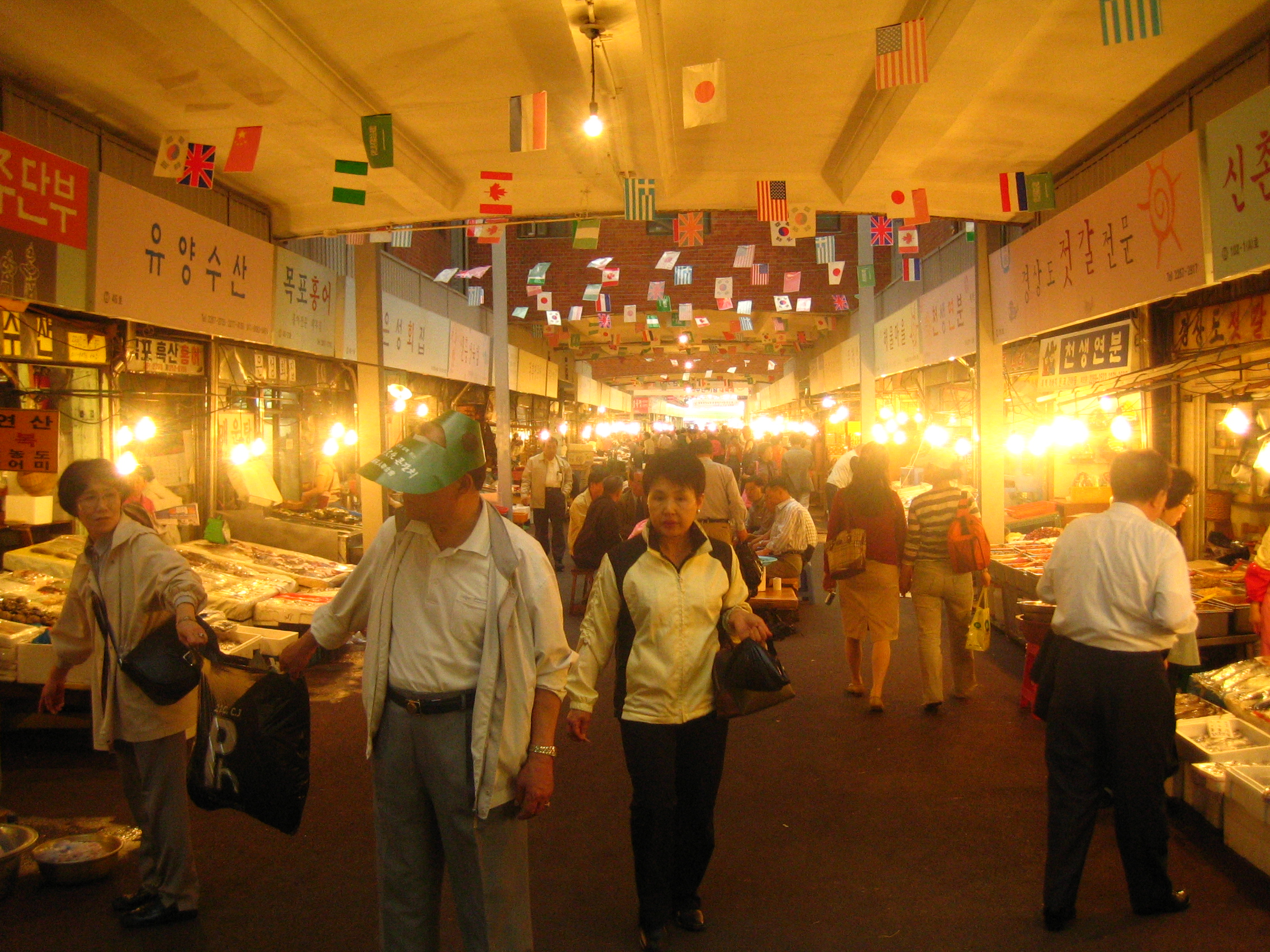
Interior of a fish market in Gwangjang Market

== See also ==
- Shopping in Seoul
- List of markets in South Korea
- List of South Korean tourist attractions
