= CC cream =

Marketing term for Color Control cream or Color Correcting cream

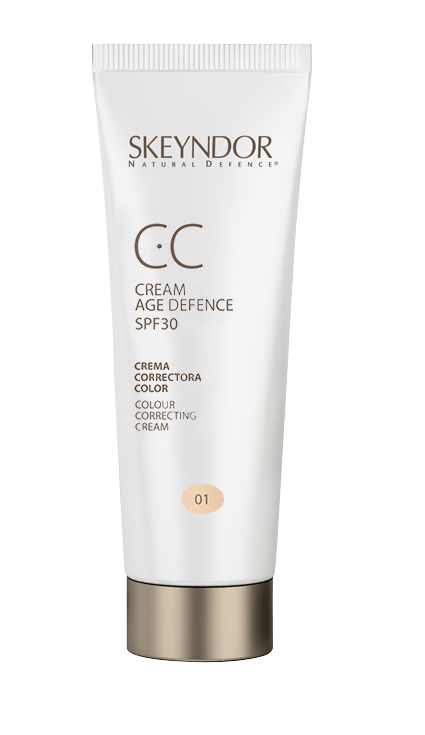
An example of a cream marketed as CC, standing for "Colour Correcting"

CC cream is a South Korean marketing term coined in the wake of the marketing term Blemish Balm cream or Beauty Balm. "CC cream" originally created in South Korea is used by some brands to mean Color Control cream, or Color Correcting cream, and some brands claim to reduce the appearance of skin redness or sallowness or to improve uneven skin tone. BB creams and CC creams are both tinted moisturizers containing sun protection. BB (Blemish Balm) cream was originally formulated in Germany and then further developed in South Korea and has gained popularity across the rest of Asia, and in recent years is also gaining popularity in Europe and North America.

Coverage can vary greatly among the different brands, and differences are usually minimal when compared to BB creams. Some users apply them as primers rather than as a replacement for foundation. Most cosmetics companies offer both BB- and CC-creams.

== See also ==
- DD cream
