= Dongdaemun Market =

Shopping area in Seoul, South Korea

Coordinates: 37.57041°N 127.00896°E

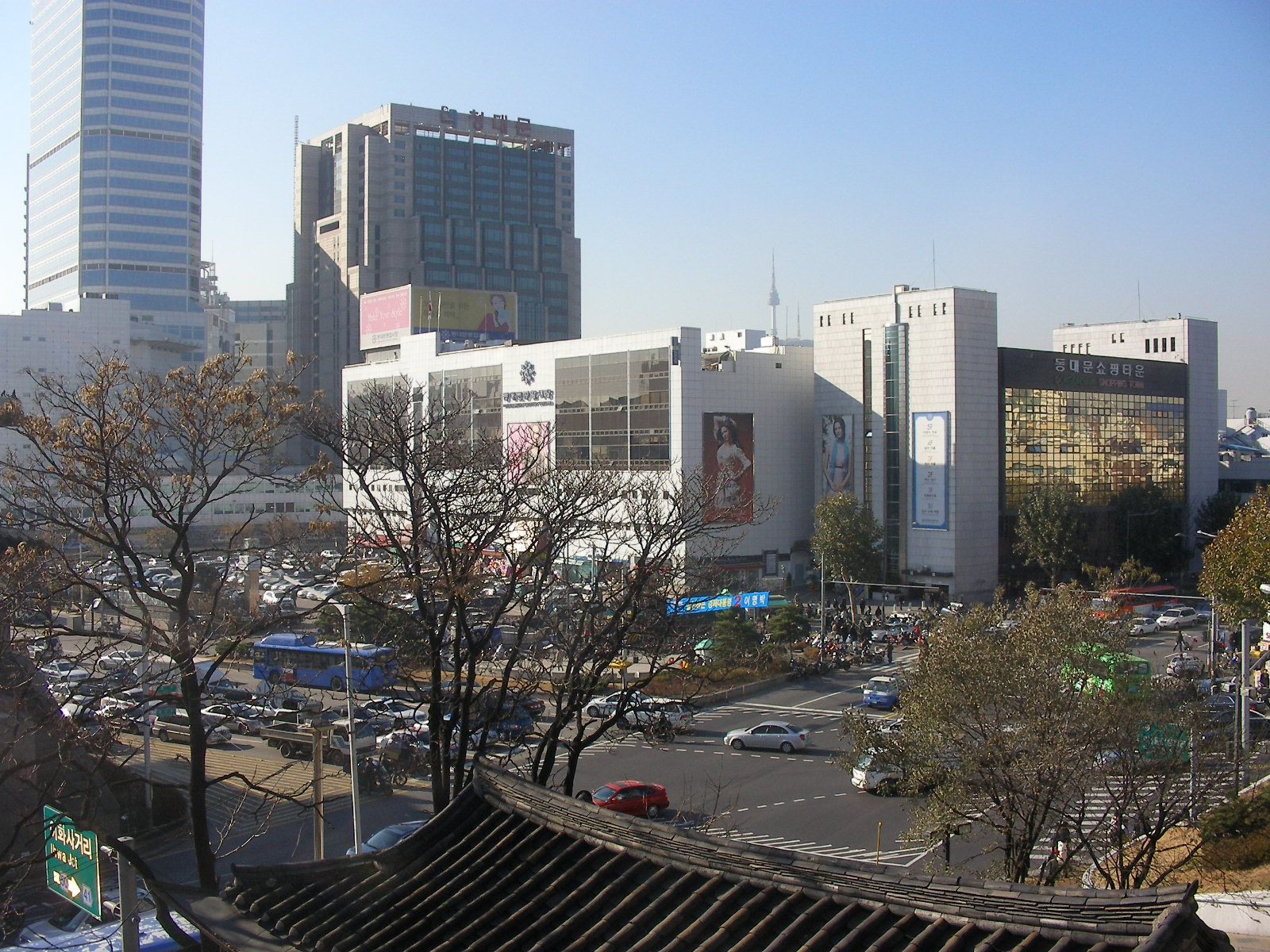
- One of the main buildings of the market (2007)
- Location: Jongno District, Seoul, South Korea
- Opened: July 1905
- Website: ddm-mall.com/eng/ (in English)

Korean name
- Hangul: 동대문시장
- Hanja: 東大門市場
- RR: Dongdaemun sijang
- MR: Tongdaemun sijang

Dongdaemun Market (Korean: 동대문시장) is a large commercial district in Jongno District, Seoul, South Korea. With traditional markets and shopping centers, it is a popular shopping and tourist destination that has been designated a "Special Tourism Zone" (관광특구) since 2002.

== History ==
Dongdaemun Market opened in July 1905 in Yeji-dong (Korean: 예지동; Hanja: 禮智洞), and during the period of Japanese rule the market was known as Baeogae Market (배오개시장, "Pear tree hill market"). It was also called Gwangjang Market (광장시장) as a company of the same name was set up as market management.

The market was set in a closed structure until the Korean War, when it was completely destroyed. It slowly rebuilt over the years and, in 1959, a building was constructed and the market was revived. In 1998 and 1999, large shopping malls such as Geopyeong Freya, Migliore, and Doosan Tower were built in the district, and the market was renovated with a modern atmosphere in the traditional market.

== Characteristics ==
Dongdaemun Market is near Dongdaemun from which it takes its name. The market is divided into five shopping districts—A, B, C, D and a shopping town, with 26 shopping malls over 10 blocks, 30,000 speciality shops, and 50,000 manufacturers.

The market sells all types of goods but notably silks and fabric, clothes, shoes and leather goods, sporting goods, plumbing and electronics, office supplies, fortune tellers, toys and food areas specialising in Korean cuisine. It also has many pet shops. It is on the Seoul list of "Asia's 10 greatest street food cities" for the Korean snack Soondae and mandu.

DDM was traditionally a night market and wholesalers once operated from 1:00 am to 1:00 pm. Now, the area is open for 18.5 hours a day from 10:30 am to 5:00 am, with some stores open 24 hours a day, although most close on Sundays and holidays.

=== Malls ===
==== Retail shops ====
The main street divides Dongdaemun Market into two sections. Section 1 is on the side where Doosan Tower is located, and Section 2 is on the side of the Dongdaemun Design Plaza & Park, the old site of Dongdaemun Stadium. Huge shopping malls in Section 1 basically sell wholesale and retail goods, but mostly deal with general customers and tourists at retail prices. They have facilities like money exchanges and information desks with English-speaking staff. Opening hours are aimed at general customers, from 10 am to 5 am the next day. Major shopping malls are Doosan Tower, Migliore, Freya Town and Hello apM.

==== Wholesale shops ====
Shopping malls in Section 2 sell goods in wholesale and retail, but mainly sell in bulk. Malls here usually open at about 8 pm and close at 8 am or 5 pm the next day. The peak time comes late at night through early morning. Since most shops deal with wholesalers, there are no dressing rooms. Major shopping malls in Section 2 are Designer's Club, Migliore Valley, Nuzzon, Gwanghee Fashion Mall, Jeil Pyeonghwa, and Heungin Stardom. Among them, Jeil Pyeonghwa and Heungin Stardom attract customers in their thirties and forties. Teens and youth in their twenties usually visit Designer's Club, Migliore Valley, Nuzzon and Gwanghee Fashion Mall.

== Gallery ==
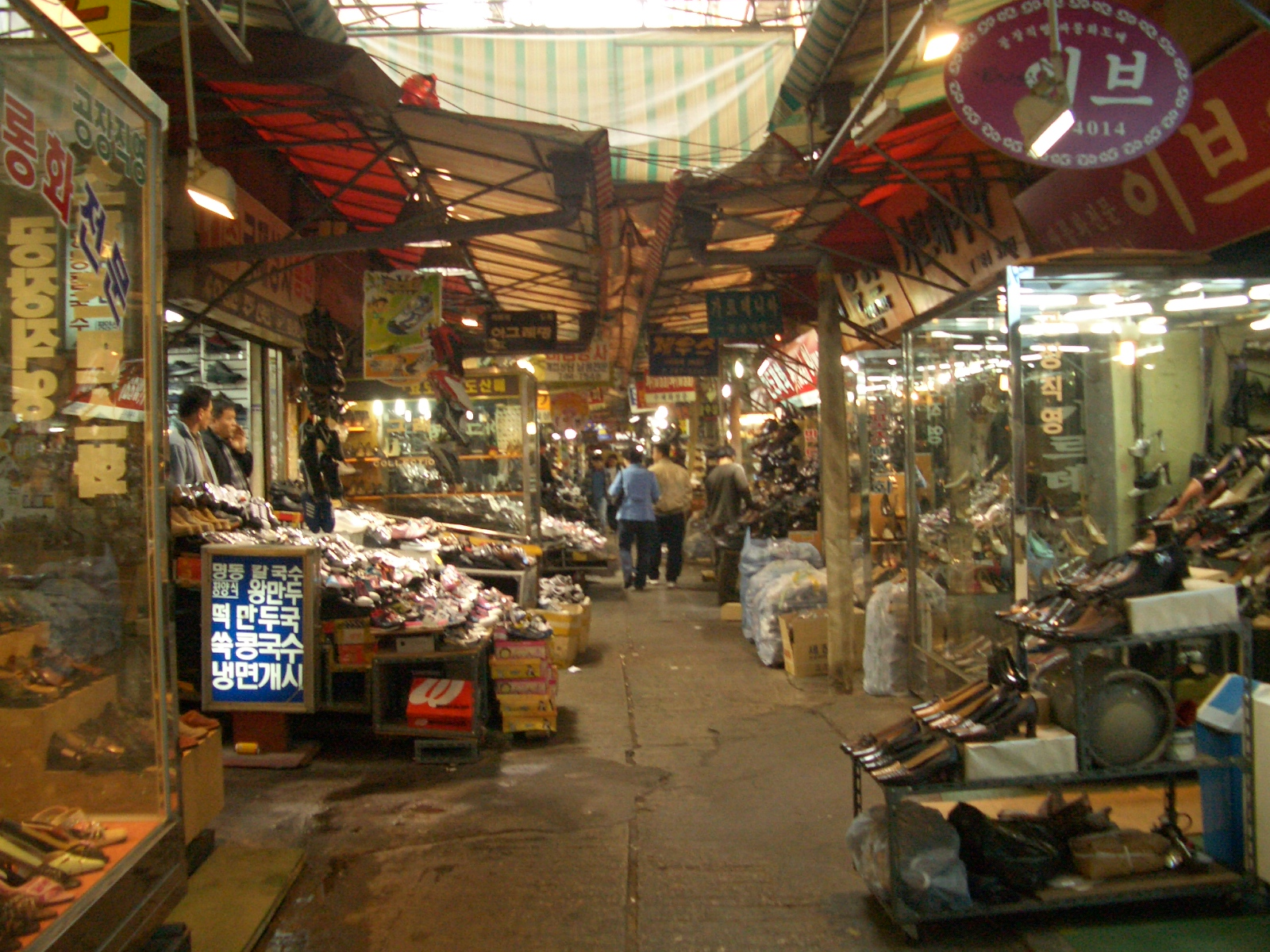
Shoe shops in the area (2005)

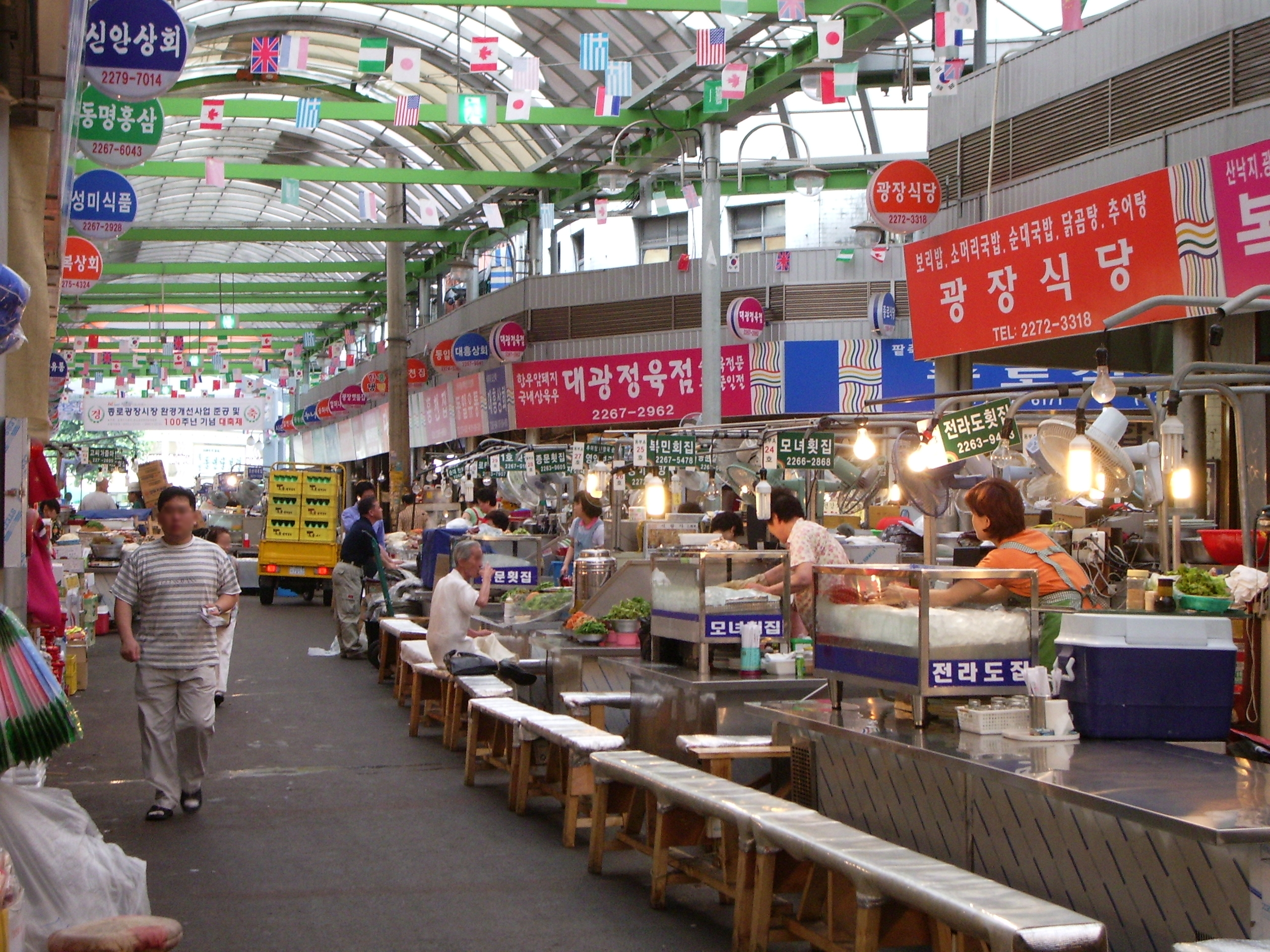
Food counters (2005)

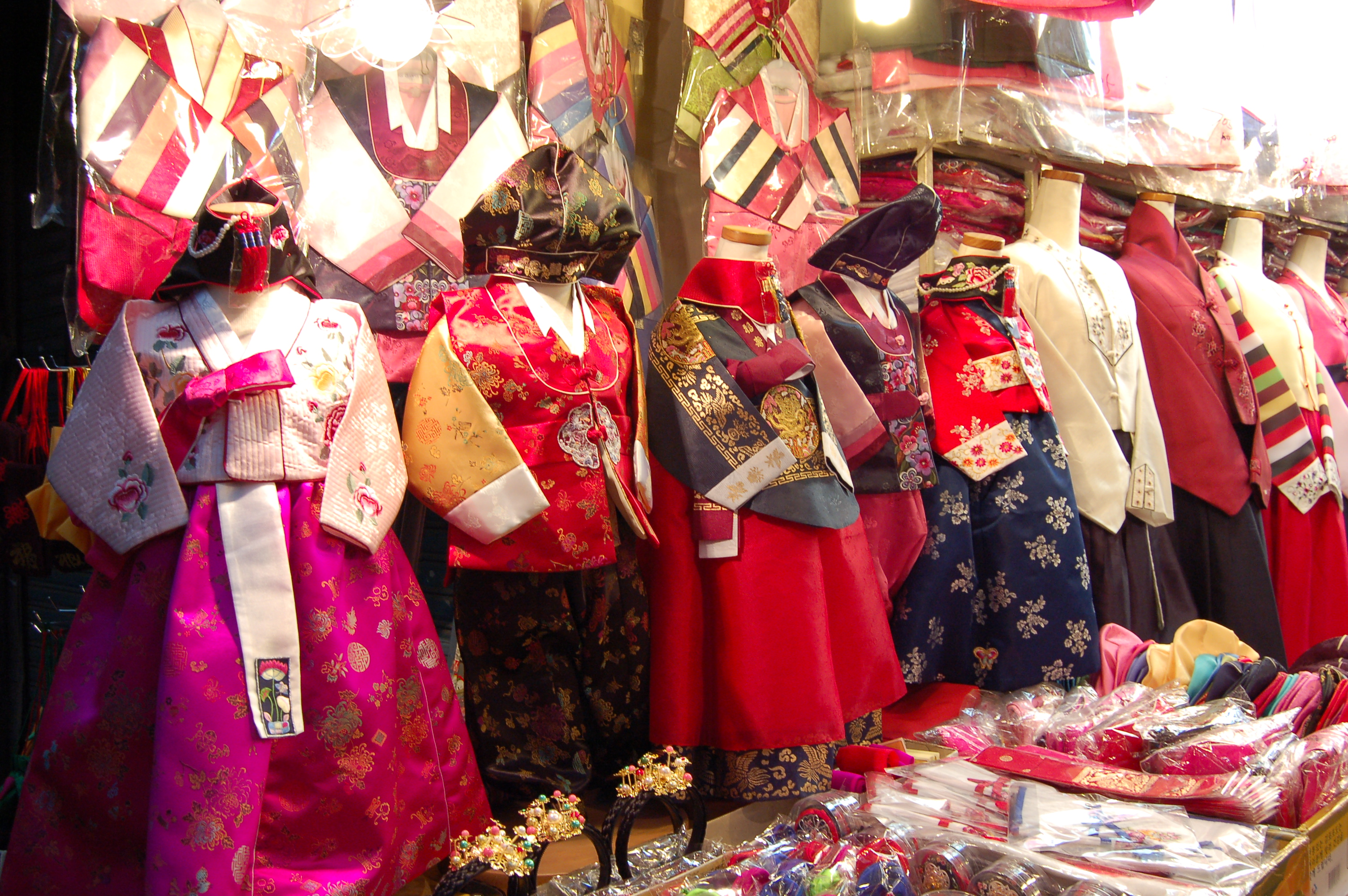
Clothes for sale in a hanbok shop (2007)

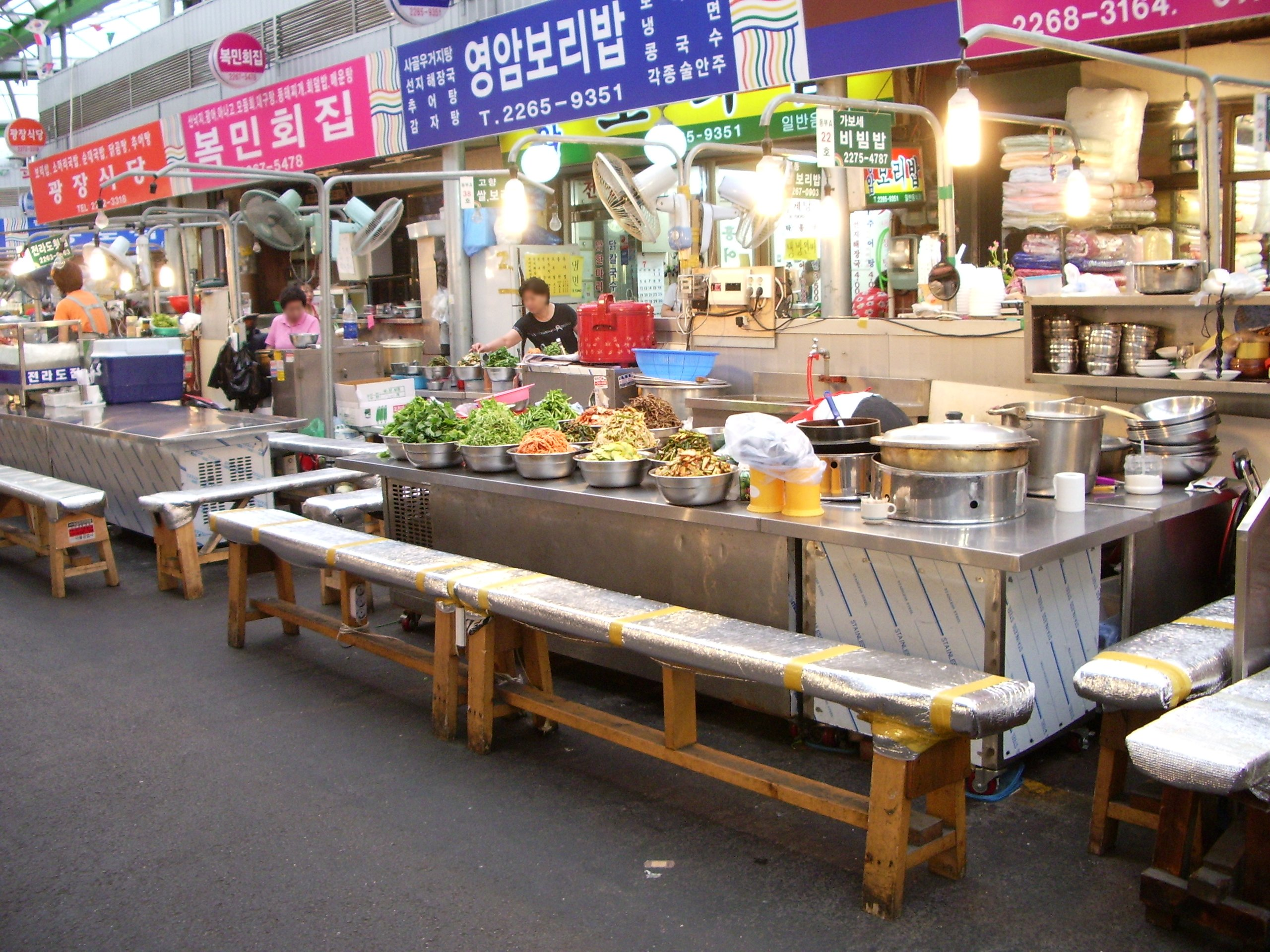
Food counters (2005)

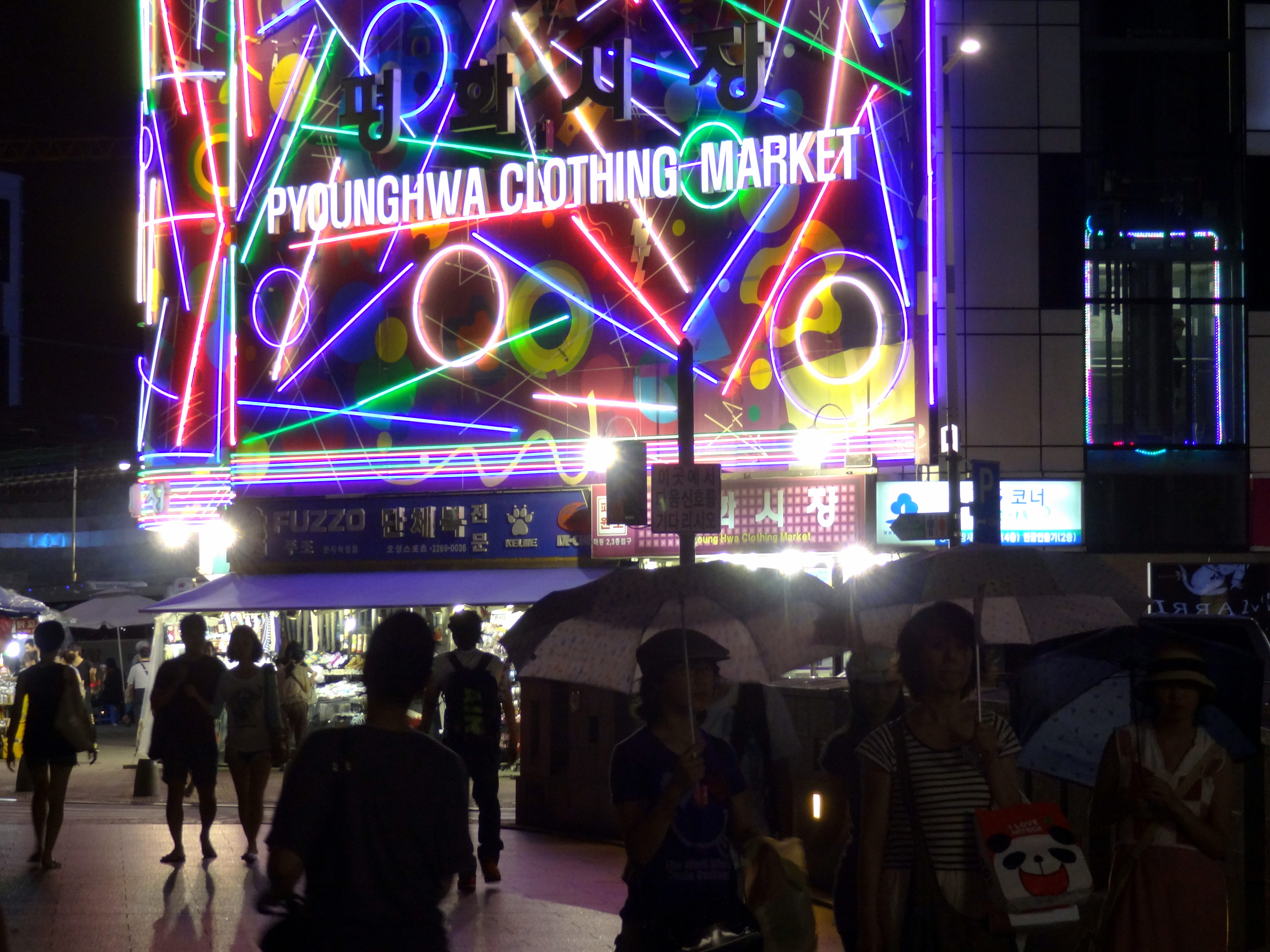
Pyounghwa Clothing Market, in the area (2011)

== See also ==
- Shopping in Seoul
- List of markets in South Korea
- List of South Korean tourist attractions
