= DD cream =

Marketing term that stands for dynamic do-all or daily defense

DD cream is a marketing term that followed the invention of BB creams and CC creams, and it often stands for dynamic do-all or daily defense. There is no quantifiable definition of a DD cream that distinguishes it from BB or CC creams.

Its definition in fashion media channels varies: for example, it is sometimes described as a BB/CC hybrid with additional anti-aging properties, or as combining "the protection properties of a BB cream and the colour correcting properties of a CC cream."

Like BB and CC creams, DD creams contain SPF, anti-aging, and moisturizing ingredients, and differences between them and the BB and CC variants differ from brand to brand.

== History ==
Beginning in 2012, companies began releasing a number of DD creams, calling them "daily defense" creams for your body with a focus on anti-aging properties.

== See also ==
- BB cream
- CC cream
