= Migliore =

South Korean department stores

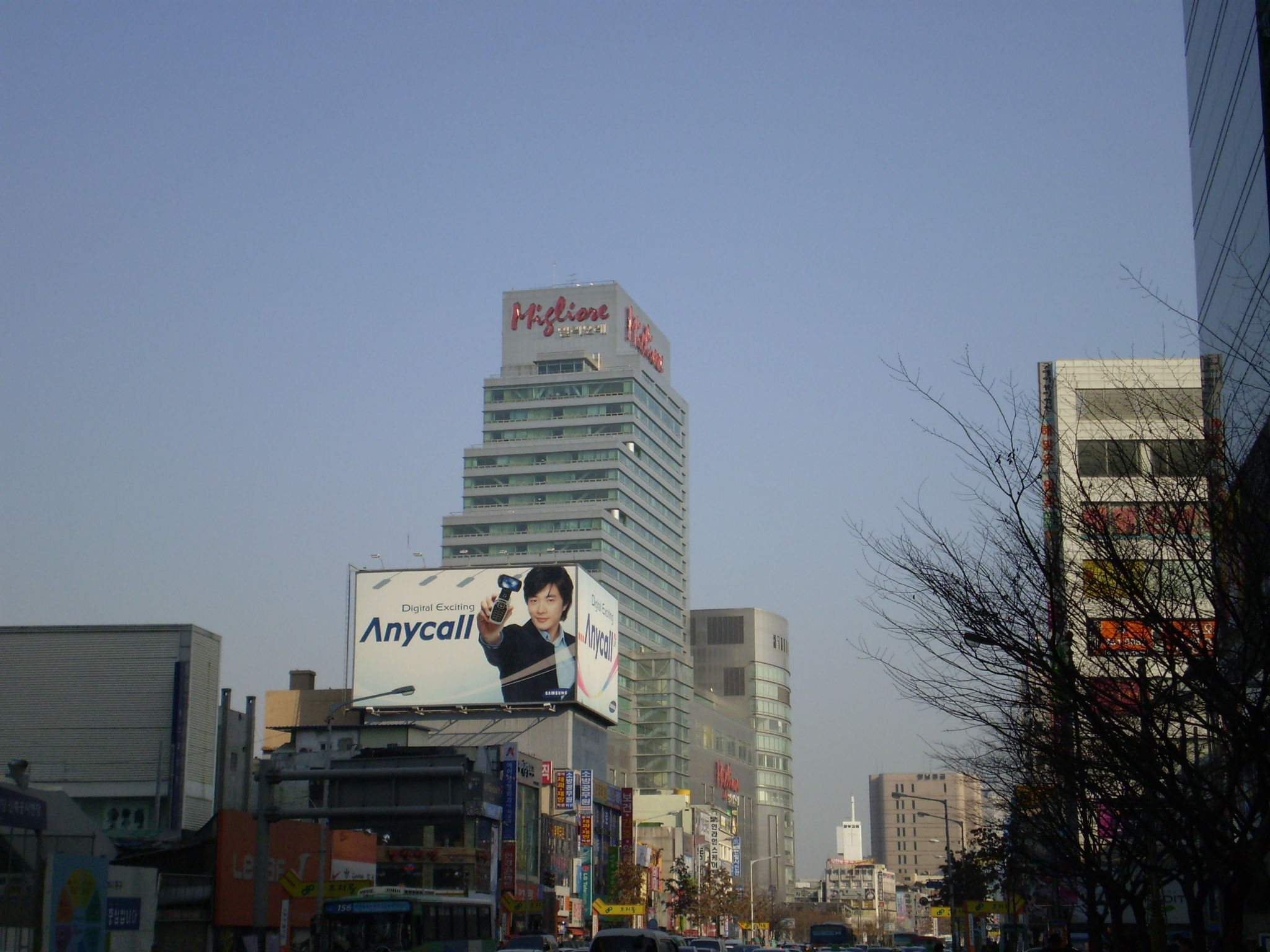
Migliore in Daegu

Migliore (Italian: [miʎˈʎoːre], meaning better or best; Korean: 밀리오레, romanized: Milliore) is the name of a chain of shopping malls in South Korea. The tenants are small businesses, most of which specialize in selling clothing and fashion accessories. The first mall opened in the Dongdaemun shopping district in Seoul in 1998. Another mall opened in Myeongdong, one of the premier shopping districts in Korea, in 2000. This particular mall originally started out as a vertical mall, and afterwards ceded most of the retail space to a hotel. There were also malls in other major Korean cities, including Busan, Daegu, Gwangju, and Suwon.
