= CU (store) =

South Korean convenience store chain

- Logo used since November 2017

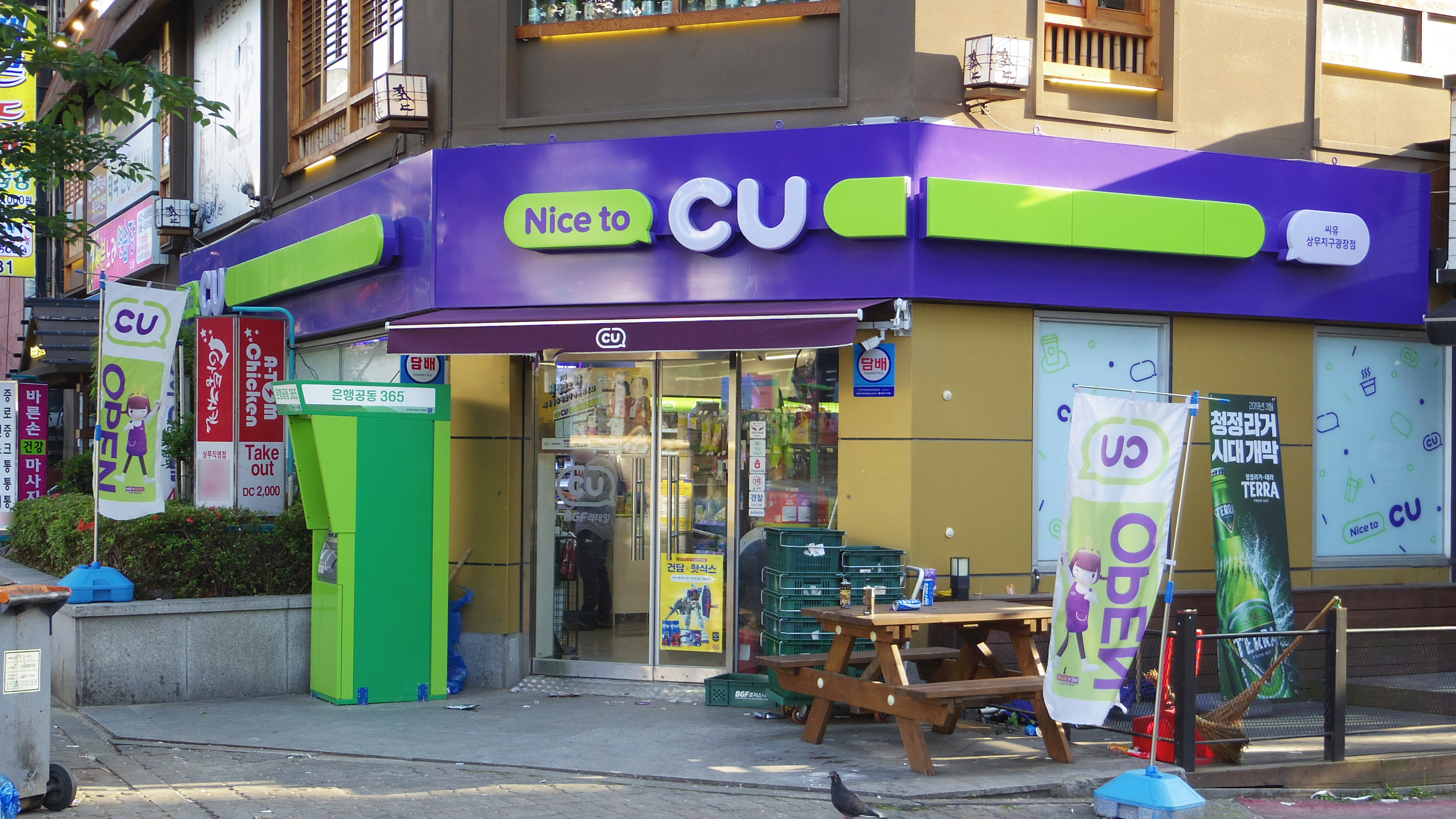
- A typical CU store in Gwangju, South Korea
- Type: Subsidiary
- Industry: Convenience stores
- Founded: 1990; 36 years ago (As the South Korean branch of FamilyMart); 2012; 14 years ago (Current form)
- Headquarters: South Korea
- Number of locations: 19,000 (as of 2025)
- Area served: South Korea; Iran (2018, Formerly); Mongolia; Malaysia; Kazakhstan; United States
- Owner: BGF Retail
- Parent: BGF Group; FamilyMart (former)
- Website: cu.bgfretail.com/en/index.do

CU (Korean: 씨유; RR: Ssiyu) (KRX: 027410) is a South Korean convenience store chain owned and operated by BGF Retail. It was formed after FamilyMart's franchise license in South Korea expired. As of 2025, the chain has more than 18,000 stores across South Korea and 680 stores in other parts of Asia. The first store in the U.S. opened in Hawaii in November 2025.

== History ==
In 1990, the Bogwang Group formed a license contract with FamilyMart to launch convenience stores under the FamilyMart brand in South Korea. The first FamilyMart in South Korea opened in October 1990. On December 1, 1994, the Bogwang Group established a separate corporation; Bogwang FamilyMart (now the BGF Group) to oversee its convenience store operations division. The chain enjoyed steady growth, reaching 2,000 stores in 2003 and 5,000 stores by 2010.

Bogwang FamilyMart officially changed its name to BGF Retail on June 8, 2012, and subsequently announced the launching of its new convenience store brand "CU". South Korea's FamilyMart was officially renamed to CU on August 1, 2012, along with the opening of the first store utilizing the new name. The change came as BGF Retail aimed to create a "Korean-style" convenience store and cease its payment of royalties to FamilyMart. In April 2019, CU has started a delivery service, and magnified the service to 1000 stores in May. In Oct 2024, CU announced that it had introduced the industry's first door-to-door home delivery service.

== Foreign operations ==
=== Current operations ===
==== Kazakhstan ====
The first store opened in March 2024 in Almaty. In general, the project provides for the opening of about one hundred CU shops in Kazakhstan at the first stage. By 2029, BGF Retail plans to open 500 outlets in Kazakhstan and is also considering entering neighbouring markets.

==== Malaysia ====
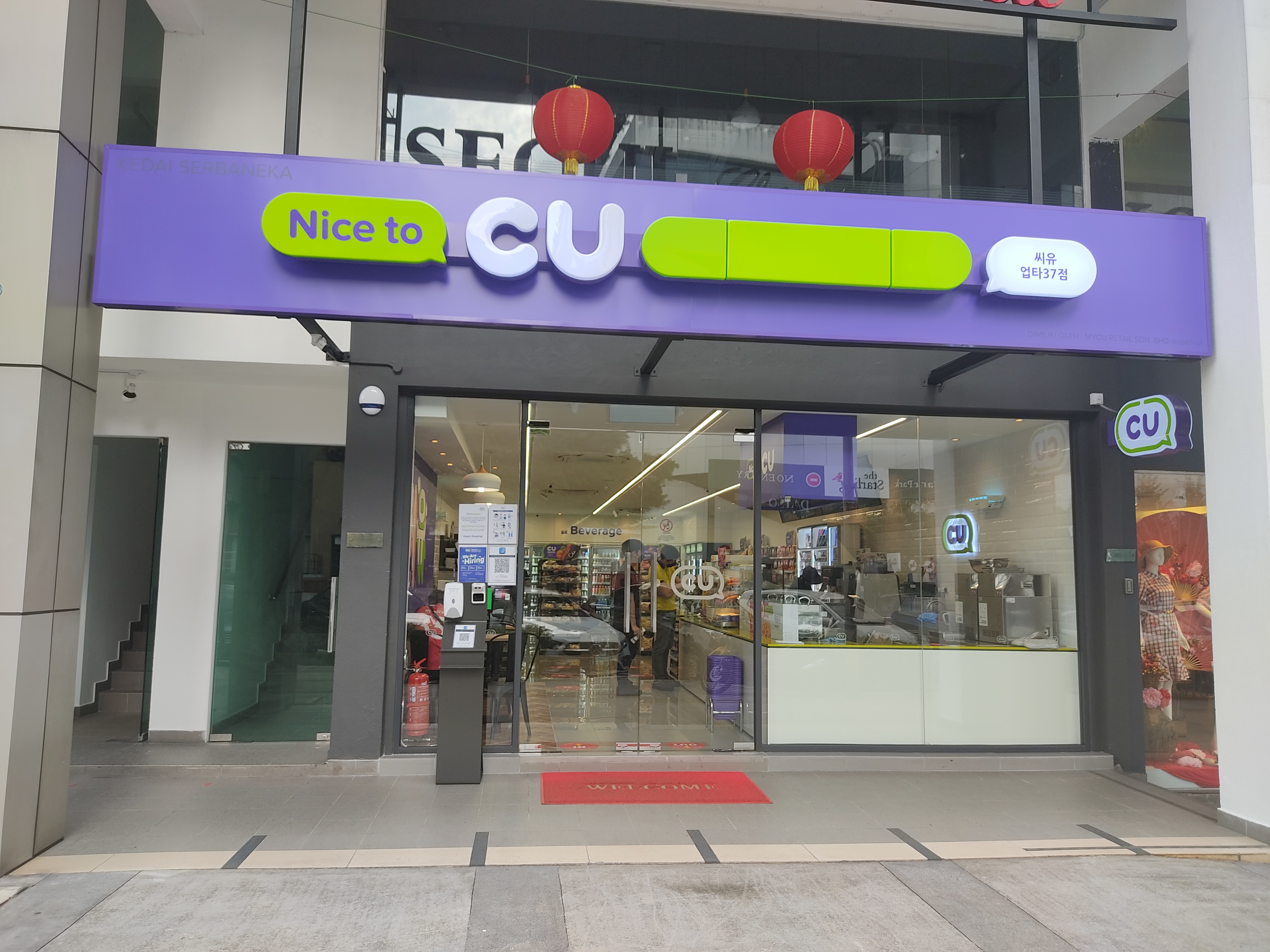
A CU store in Damansara Utama, Selangor

CU opened its first stores within Malaysia in 2021, after reaching a partnership with local convenience store company myNews Holdings Bhd. CU plans to open 500 stores within Malaysia by 2026; the group will initially open 30 to 50 CU stores and assess their sales performance before expanding further. In April 2021, CU opened its first store in Centerpoint Bandar Utama.

==== Mongolia ====
CU has opened a net total of 363 stores; 348 stores in Ulaanbaatar, 3 in Erdenet City, 1 store in Darkhan-Uul, 1 in Lün, Töv Province, 1 in Kharkhorin, Ovorkhangai, 1 in Selenge, 1 in Khentii Province, 1 in Choir, Govisumber, CU competes with another Korean convenience chain, GS25, which has 124 stores throughout the capital region.

==== United States ====
In May 2025, CU announced it would expand to the U.S. market, with the first stores opening in Hawaii in the fourth quarter. The flagship store is located at the Executive Centre in Honolulu and opened in November 2025.

=== Former operations ===
==== Iran ====
CU launched its first foreign store in November 2018, in Tehran, Iran. However, the store closed less than a month later due to the United States' sanctions against Iran.

== Impersonation ==
=== Brazil ===
In October 2024, a ramen shop in Liberdade, São Paulo rebranded itself as a CU store, using aesthetic elements which were used by the Korean brand between 2012 and 2017. Despite its name and branding, the store is not affiliated with CU.

The fake CU store went viral online, as "cu" is a slang term for "anus" in Portuguese. The store attracts visitors from across Brazil with customers waiting more than an hour to get in.

== Gallery ==
Logo used until August 1, 2012

Logo used from August 1, 2012, to November 2017
