= Hi-Living =

South Korean e-commerce company

- Native name: 하이리빙
- Type: Public
- Industry: Electronic commerce
- Founded: 1996; 30 years ago
- Founder: Baek Seung Hyeok
- Headquarters: Seoul, South Korea
- Area served: South Korea
- Key people: Baek Seung Hyeok (CEO)
- Products: Online auction business model, Shopping mall
- Number of employees: 530 (2005)
- Website: www.hiliving.co.kr

Hi-Living is a Korean online auction website and shopping mall where people buy and sell goods and services. It was founded in 1996 by Baek Seung Hyeok and is headquartered in Seoul.

== History ==
Hi-Living was founded in 1996 by Baek Seung Hyeok as a combination of "Hi" and "Living", which were parts of a larger personal site. Originally, the site belonged to Internet Life Consumer Group, a consulting firm. Hi-Living is headquartered in Seoul, Korea.

== Items and Services ==
Collectibles, appliances, chemicals, and other miscellaneous items are listed, bought, and sold on the Hi-Living website. Hi-Living has revolutionized the collectibles market by bringing together buyers and sellers. Large Korean companies sell their newest products and offer services using competitive auctions and fixed-priced storefronts. Regional searches of the database make shipping slightly more rapid or cheaper. Software developers can create applications that integrate with the marketplace through the Hi-Living Service by joining the developers program. There are thousands of members in the Hi-Living Developers Program, comprising a broad range of companies creating software applications to support Hi-Living buyers and sellers, as well as Hi-Living Affiliate Systems.

== Controversy ==
There has also been controversy regarding items put up for bid that violate ethical standards. Once, a man offered one of his kidneys for auction on Hi-Living, attempting to profit from the potentially lucrative market for transplantable human organs. On other occasions, people and even entire towns have been listed, often as a joke. In general, auctions that violate its terms of service agreement are removed quickly. Hi-Living is also an easy place for unscrupulous sellers to market counterfeit merchandise, which can be difficult for novice buyers to distinguish without careful study of the auction description.

== Profit and Transactions ==
Hi-Living generates revenue from sellers, who pay both a fee based on the selling price of each item and a fee based on the starting price, and from advertising. In 2005 it was announced that Hi-Living would increase fees it charges to sellers, which caused such controversy among users that the CEO emailed all Hi-Living users with news that other fees would be decreased.

Hi-Living does not handle goods, nor does it manage the buyer-seller payments, except through its subsidiary shopping mall credit. Instead, much like newspaper want-ads, sellers rely on the buyers' good faith to make payment, and buyers rely on the sellers' good faith to actually deliver the goods intact. To encourage fidelity, Hi-Living maintains, rates, and publicly displays the post-transaction feedback from all users, whether they buy or sell. The buyer is encouraged to examine the sellers' feedback profile before bidding to see their trustworthiness. Sellers with high ratings generally have more bids and garner higher bids. However, it is possible for sellers to make their feedback private and just leave a numbered rating (number of positive, negative, and neutral feedback with a positive feedback percentage), which means that bidders and sellers cannot see the comments other users have left. Hi-Living also has a significant affiliate program, and affiliates can place product images and links on their web sites.

== See also ==
- Electronic commerce
- Online auction business model
- Shopping mall
- Chemical
