= Skin Food =

South Korean cosmetics company

- Founded: 1957
- Headquarters: Seocho-dong, Seocho-gu, Seoul, South Korea
- Area served: Asia
- Products: Skincare
- Website: theskinfood.com

Skin Food (Korean: 스킨푸드) is a South Korean skincare and cosmetics manufacturer and retailer, headquartered in Seoul.

== Company ==
Its headquarters is located in the DaeRyung Scecho Tower in Seocho-dong, Seocho-gu.

In August 2012, as part of Lotte Department Store's expansion programme into China, Skin Food was featured in a replica of Myeong-dong in its new store in Tianjin, along with Missha and The Face Shop.

Skin Food has seen increase in sales from foreign visitors and have opened outlets outside South Korea such as Taiwan, Philippines, China, Indonesia, Malaysia, Singapore, Japan and Hong Kong in Asia and many others in Europe and the Americas. Korean actors and actresses such as Shin Won-ho, Lee Jong-suk, Kang Tae-oh, Yim Si-wan, Ryu Jun-yeol, Sung Yu-ri, Lee Min-jung, Ha Yeon-soo, Kim You-jung, Shin Eun-soo and Brazilian singer Stephanie Garden were featured in Skin Food Korea commercials.

== Products ==
Skinfood's best-selling products

- Carrot Carotene Calming Water Pad
- Royal Honey Propolis Enrich Barrier Cream
- Skinfood black sugar mask

== Spokespersons and models ==
- 2011: Lee Min-jung
- 2013: Ha Yeon-soo
- 2015: Kim You-jung
- 2017: Shin Eun-soo
- 2021: Hwang Kwang-hee
- 2022: Soyoon

== Controversy ==
In August 2012, Hong Kong Consumer Council announced that two of Skin Food's nail products contained benzene, which is a known carcinogen for leukemia. The company denied using benzene in their products.

== See also ==
- Shopping in Seoul
- List of South Korean retail companies
