= Nature Republic =

South Korean cosmetics brand

Nature Republic 네이처 리퍼블릭
- Founded: March 2009
- Founder: Jung Woon-Ho
- Headquarters: Seoul, South Korea
- Area served: Worldwide
- Products: Skincare
- Website: naturerepublic.com

Nature Republic (Korean: 네이처 리퍼블릭) is a South Korean cosmetics brand created in 2009.

== History ==
Nature Republic opened its first store in March 2009. In 2011, the brand expanded internationally with store openings in Taiwan, Singapore, Thailand, Malaysia, and Cambodia.

In 2011, Nature Republic opened its first store in Cambodia and launched its first store in the Philippines on November 13, 2012.

The brand was involved in a scandal in 2015, when its founder and former CEO Jung Woon-ho was imprisoned for embezzlement and breach of trust for gambling overseas. He also allegedly spent billions of won in lobbying for a shorter sentence. After replacing him with Kim Chang-ho, the brand opened more stores in the U.S., which already has 17 of its stores since 2012. It launched a store in Torrance, California, and has plans of opening another in Elmhurst, New York as part of its plans to continue building up its presence in the country. In December 2019 Nature Republic shop was launched in Uzbekistan

== Spokespersons and models ==
- 2011: Jang Keun-suk
- 2013: In November 2015, JYJ, Girls' Generation's Taeyeon and EXO renewed their contracts as Nature Republic models since 2013 until now.
- 2016: Park Hye-su, Kim Joo-ha
- 2020: In January 2020, Nature Republic announced that EXO would no longer be models for the brand. Later in April 2020, it was announced that NCT 127 will be Nature Republic's new model for the next 10 years.
- 2023: Lightsum

== See also ==
- Shopping in Seoul
- List of South Korean retail companies
