= Innisfree (brand) =

South Korean cosmetic brand

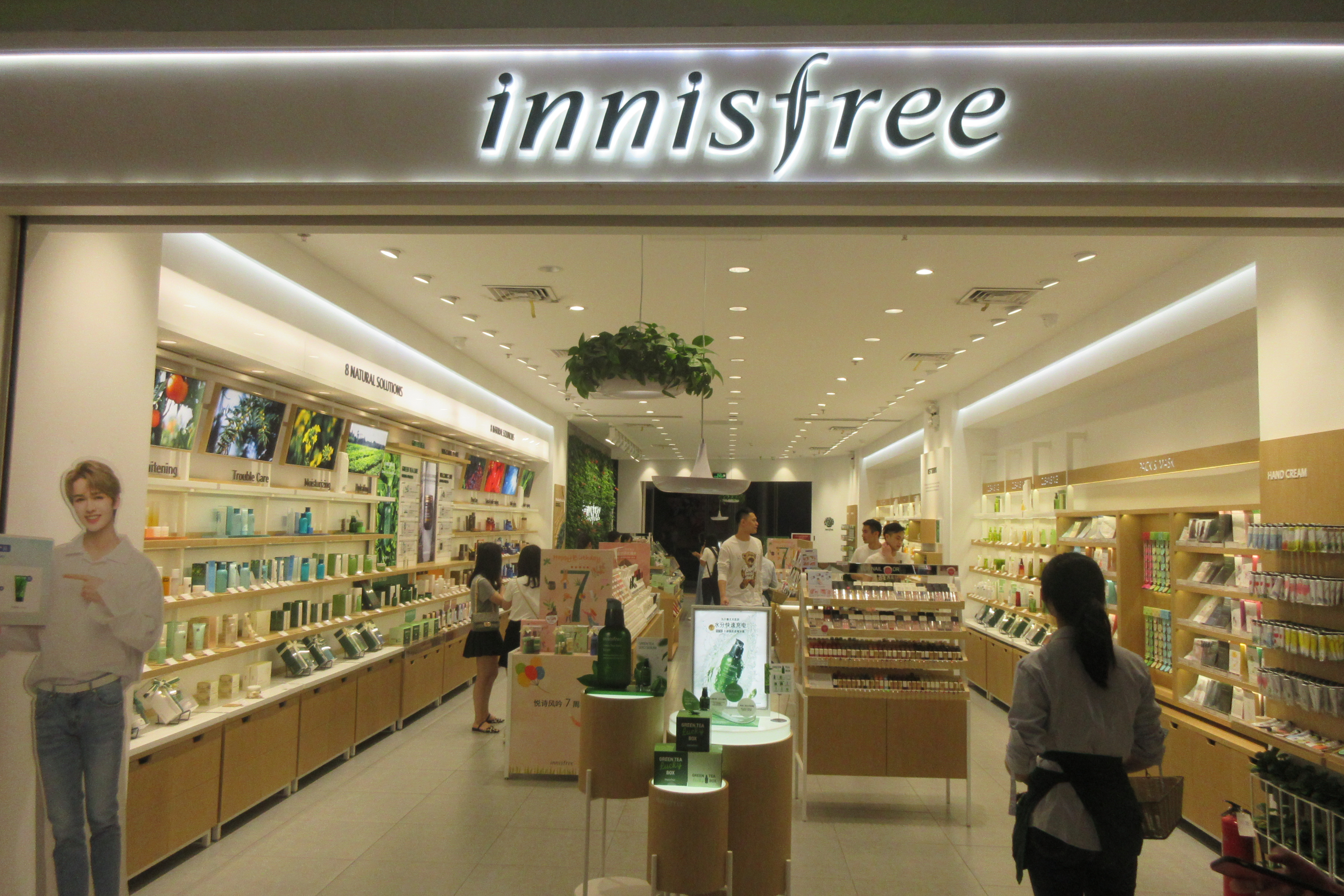
- Innisfree store in Shenzhen, China
- Native name: 이니스프리
- Founded: 2000 in South Korea
- Founder: Suh Kyungbae
- Headquarters: Yongsan, Seoul, South Korea
- Area served: Asia, North America, Australia, Russia
- Products: Skincare; makeup; body & hair; perfume; fragrance
- Parent: Amore Pacific
- Website: www.innisfree.com

Innisfree (Korean: 이니스프리) is a South Korean cosmetics brand owned and founded by Amore Pacific in 2000. The brand name derives from Irish poet W. B. Yeats' poem, 'The Lake Isle of Innisfree'. Innisfree has stores in South Korea, Hong Kong, Macau, Mainland China, Japan, Taiwan, Singapore, Malaysia, Thailand, Vietnam, Indonesia, the Philippines, India, the United States, Canada, Australia, and the United Arab Emirates.

Innisfree is popular for its affordability and brand concept, which emphasizes healthy and reasonably priced beauty products with ingredients responsibly sourced from Jeju Island, South Korea. Innisfree was the first K-beauty brand to launch two inclusive cushion foundation lines with 14 shades.

== History ==
The Old logo of the company until February of 2023

Innisfree was launched by the largest skincare and cosmetics company in South Korea, Amore Pacific, in 2000 and was marketed as the manufacturer's first eco-friendly brand. The brand name originates from W. B. Yeats' poem, 'The Lake Isle of Innisfree'.

=== Expansion ===
Amore Pacific opened its first brand road-shop in 2005 and its 100th in 2007.

==== Asia ====
The brand's first flagship store opened in Shanghai on April 25, 2012. The company expanded and opened stores in Hong Kong, Singapore and India in 2013. The first Indian store was opened in New Delhi on October 10, 2013 and the first Singaporean store on November 22, 2013. By 2014, the company had over 80 stores in South Korea, Japan, Hong Kong, Singapore and India. In the first half of 2014, Amore Pacific planned on boosting the brand's sales in Taipei and opened a second store months after launching in Taiwan, aiming to make Innisfree the country's biggest South Korean skincare and cosmetics brand. On December 5, 2014, Innisfree opened its first store in Malaysia. In its fifteenth year, the brand was launched in Thailand and Innisfree opened its largest flagship store at Hongyi Square in Shanghai, China, with over 108 stores in the country by the end of the year. The first store in Vietnam was opened in November 2016, while the first store in the Philippines opened two years later. On March 23, 2017, Innisfree opened its first store in Indonesia, located at Central Park Jakarta. The brand later entered the halal market on November 25, 2024, after receiving certification from the Indonesian Halal Product Assurance Agency (BPJPH).

==== North America ====
In 2017, the brand began expanding into the North American market and launched its first store in the United States on September 15, 2017, in Manhattan. Innisfree expanded its number of stores in the United States with the opening of another location in Manhattan on October 5, 2018. In May 2021, Amore Pacific announced that all North American Innisfree stores will close due to the negative impact the COVID-19 pandemic had on the market. However, Innisfree products will continue to be available via Sephora.

==== Australia ====
Innisfree expanded into the Australian market in 2018, establishing its first retail outlet at Melbourne Central on June 6, followed by a second location in Sydney's Queen Victoria Building later that year. This marked a continuation of the brand’s international growth. The entry into Australia was part of a strategic effort to tap into the Oceania region's demand for skincare and cosmetics. Innisfree has supplemented its physical retail presence with its own e-commerce website, enabling wider accessibility to its products across Australia and enhancing its engagement with consumers in the region.

== Sales ==
In 2011, the brand reported 140.5 billion won ($123.1 million) in sales from its 434 locations in South Korea.

In 2019, Innisfree's sales revenue was 552 billion won (~$490.6 million), down from 600 billion (~$533.3 million) in 2018.

In 2020, Innisfree's reported its lowest net profit since 2013: approximately 10.22 billion won (~$9.06 million), down from about 48.87 billion won (~$43.3 million) in 2019.

In 2023, Innisfree reported a net profit of approximately 10.3 billion won, marking a 68.2% decrease compared to the previous year. In India, the brand experienced a 25% year-on-year growth, contributing to Amorepacific Group's overall 50% growth in the country.

== Concept ==
Innisfree uses the slogan "Clean Island, where clean nature and healthy beauty coexist happily". The brand concept emphasises nature and eco-friendly practices.

== Products ==
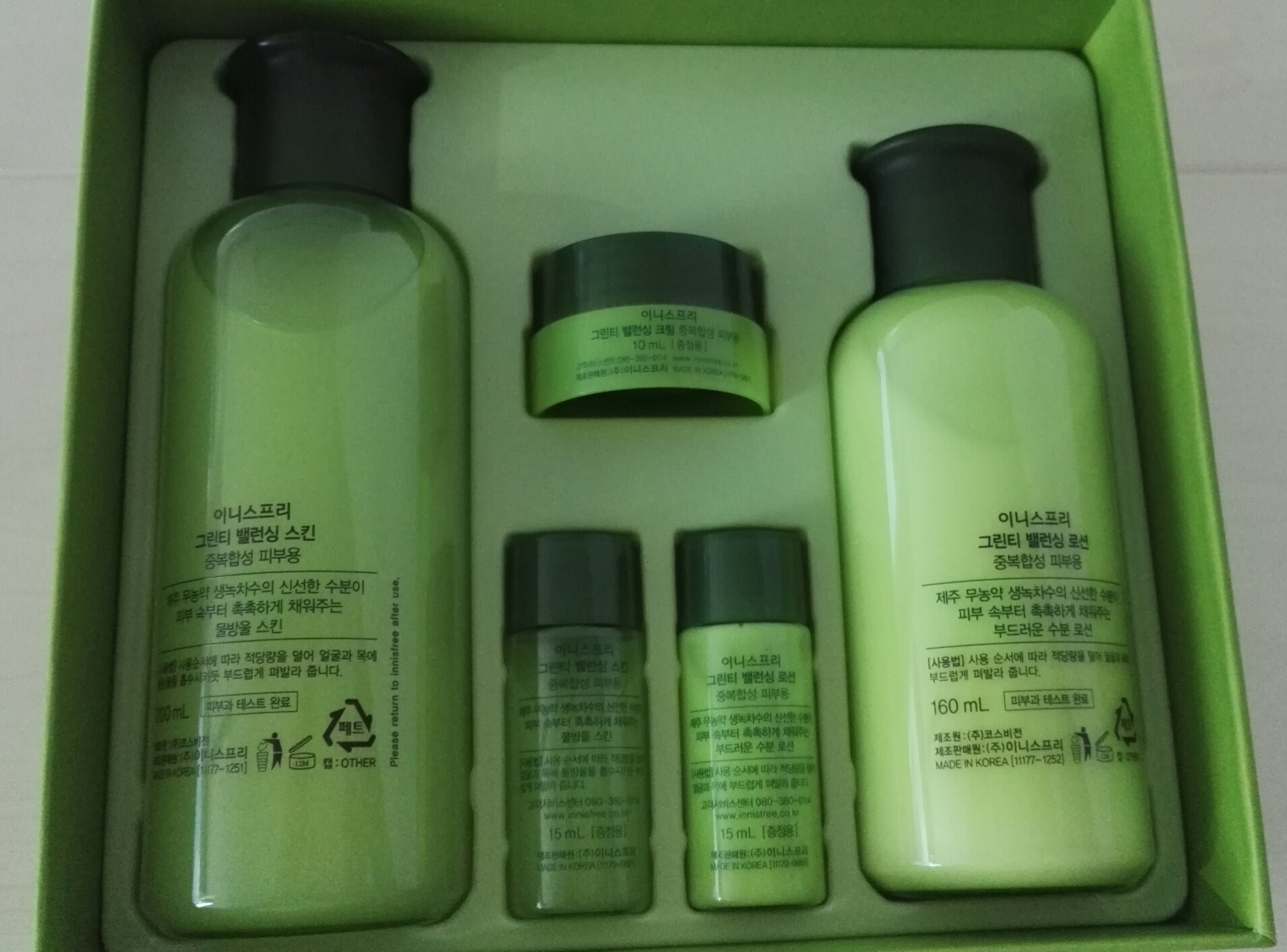
Innisfree Green Tea line products in year 2016

Innisfree is South Korea's first all-natural brand, and many of the products' ingredients are sourced from Jeju Island. The company's products range from makeup to skincare products for women and men.

== Spokespersons and models ==
Innisfree has been endorsed by numerous celebrities since its launch in 2010. The brand's first model was Han Chae-young. Actresses Kim Tae-hee and Nam Sang-mi have also endorsed the brand.

Since 2006, its notable spokespersons include actress Song Hye-kyo, actress Moon Geun-young, Girls' Generation member Yoona, actor Lee Min-ho, Twice, Loona, Wanna One, Shin Ye-eun and Ahn Hyo-seop .

In 2021, singer-songwriter Stella Jang became an Innisfree cosmetics model. Recently, Innisfree unveiled its brand model Shin Ye-eun through a promotional video of its own brand's large-scale sale event "Inni-Super-Big-Sale", which takes place once a year. Ive (former Iz*One) member Jang Won-young is the brand's global ambassador.

In February 2023, Innisfree welcomed Mingyu of Seventeen as its next global model.

== Social responsibility activities ==
- The empty bottle collection campaign: The empty bottle collection campaign is Innisfree's flagship Green Life campaign, which began in 2003. Customers can receive 300 Beauty Points for each empty bottle by returning the container of Innisfree products to the store. The number of empty bottles collected by 2020 is about 30,000, and in 2017, Innisfree opened an empty bottle space in an upcycling store that uses interior finishing materials using collected empty bottles.
- Upcycling Beauty: 'Upcycling Beauty' is a project that gives new value to discarded resources and recreates products with sincerity. In August 2018, we developed a body product using coffee foil, which was thrown away as the first project product, in collaboration with Anthracite, and in 2019, we developed a hairline with Jeju Beer. Recently, it secured Jeju Gujwa carrots, which cannot be sold from I'M Jeju, and launched an ugly carrot hand line made from carrot water and carrot oil extracted from carrots.

== Paper bottle controversy ==
In 2020, Innisfree released a repackaged version of the Green Tea Seed Serum that said, "HELLO, I'M PAPER BOTTLE". In April 2021, a customer of the product accused Innisfree of "greenwashing" and posted photographs and comments on Facebook revealing that the product was in a plastic bottle. The post went viral and led to consumer backlash that circulated in local media. Innisfree issued a public apology acknowledging that the labeling may be misleading and clarified that the packaging is recyclable and that "paper bottle explain[s] the role of the paper label surrounding the bottle."

== See also ==
- Shopping in Seoul
- List of South Korean retail companies
- Cosmetics in Korea
