= Kmall24 =

South Korean online retail store

- Founded: 2014; 12 years ago
- Headquarters: Gangnam District, Seoul, Korea
- Key people: Young-ju Kim, CEO
- Products: skin care, K-pop, Korean Drama, shopping mall, electronic commerce
- Parent: Korea International Trade Association
- Website: www.kmall24.com

Kmall24 is a Korea-based online store that offers authentic Korean products to customers around the world. It is operated by KITA (Korea International Trade Association), the largest business organization in Korea which also runs World Trade Center Seoul.

== History ==
Kmall24 was launched in 2014 by KITA (Korea International Trade Association). To meet increased demand for Korean products due to Korean Wave, KITA, a leading economic organization, promoted international online retail store project.

== Items and services ==
K-pop goods, Korean Skin care products, K-beauty products, items from Korean Drama, Korean fashion items are listed and sold. Kmall24 has over 20,000 products from 2,000 Korean vendors. Products are also listed on major shopping platforms like Amazon and eBay. Kmall24's current payments options are PayPal, Eximbay, Alipay with worldwide customer services. Kmall24 also provides services in English, Chinese, and Japanese.

== Brands ==
Kmall24 features various Korean brands from about 2,000 vendors, including Tony Moly, Dr.Jart+, Laneige, COSRX, VANT365, Dear Dahlia, Klairs, Black Monster, 4Xstyle and more. K-pop goods include Bigbang, BTS, EXO, Gir's Generation, Red Velvet, 2PM, and more.

== See also ==
- K-Beauty
- skin care
- K-Pop
- Korean Drama
