= Isa Knox =

South Korean cosmetics company

- Industry: Cosmetics
- Founded: 1995; 31 years ago
- Parent: LG Household & Health Care
- Website: isaknox.co.kr

Isa Knox (formerly Ĭsa Knox; Korean: 이자녹스) is a South Korean cosmetics company. It is owned by LG Household & Healthcare Ltd. Celebrity endorsements include Hyori Lee and Jessica Alba.

== Spokespersons and models ==
- 2005: Jessica Alba
- 2007: Lee Hyori
- 2010: Han Ga-in
- 2014: Lee Min-jung
- 2018: Kim Hee-sun
- 2023: Kim Yuna
