= Stylenanda =

South Korea-based make-up and fashion brand

- Industry: Retail
- Founded: 2004
- Founder: Kim So Hee
- Headquarters: Seoul, South Korea
- Area served: Worldwide
- Products: Fashions and Cosmetics
- Owner: Jee Eun Shin
- Website: www.stylenanda.com

Stylenanda (Korean: 스타일난다) is a South Korea-based make-up and fashion brand that is owned by L'Oréal.

Stylenanda was founded in 2004 by Nanda, owned by Kim So Hee. It had further expanded internationally and established branches in Hong Kong, China, Singapore, Japan and Thailand.

May 2, 2018 L'Oréal announced the acquisition of 100% of Nanda Co. Ltd. One of its flagship stores is located in Myeong-dong, Seoul in South Korea. Named Pink Hotel, it is a hotel-themed “everything pink” flagship store.
