= Missha =

South Korean cosmetics brand

MISSHA
- Headquarters: Seoul, South Korea
- Area served: Worldwide
- Products: Skincare
- Parent: Able C&C Co., Ltd.
- Website: missha.net

MISSHA (Korean: 미샤) is a South Korean cosmetics brand owned and operated by ABLE C&C Co., Ltd. Founded in 2000, it is recognized as one of the first-generation road shop cosmetics brands in South Korea. MISSHA gained prominence through its philosophy of offering high-quality cosmetics at affordable prices and has since expanded its product portfolio to include skincare, makeup, base makeup, and sun care. Its best-known product lines include Time Revolution and M Perfect Cover BB Cream. As of 2026, MISSHA products are available in 56 countries through approximately 42,000 distribution channels worldwide. MISSHA is one of the flagship brands of ABLE C&C, alongside A'pieu.

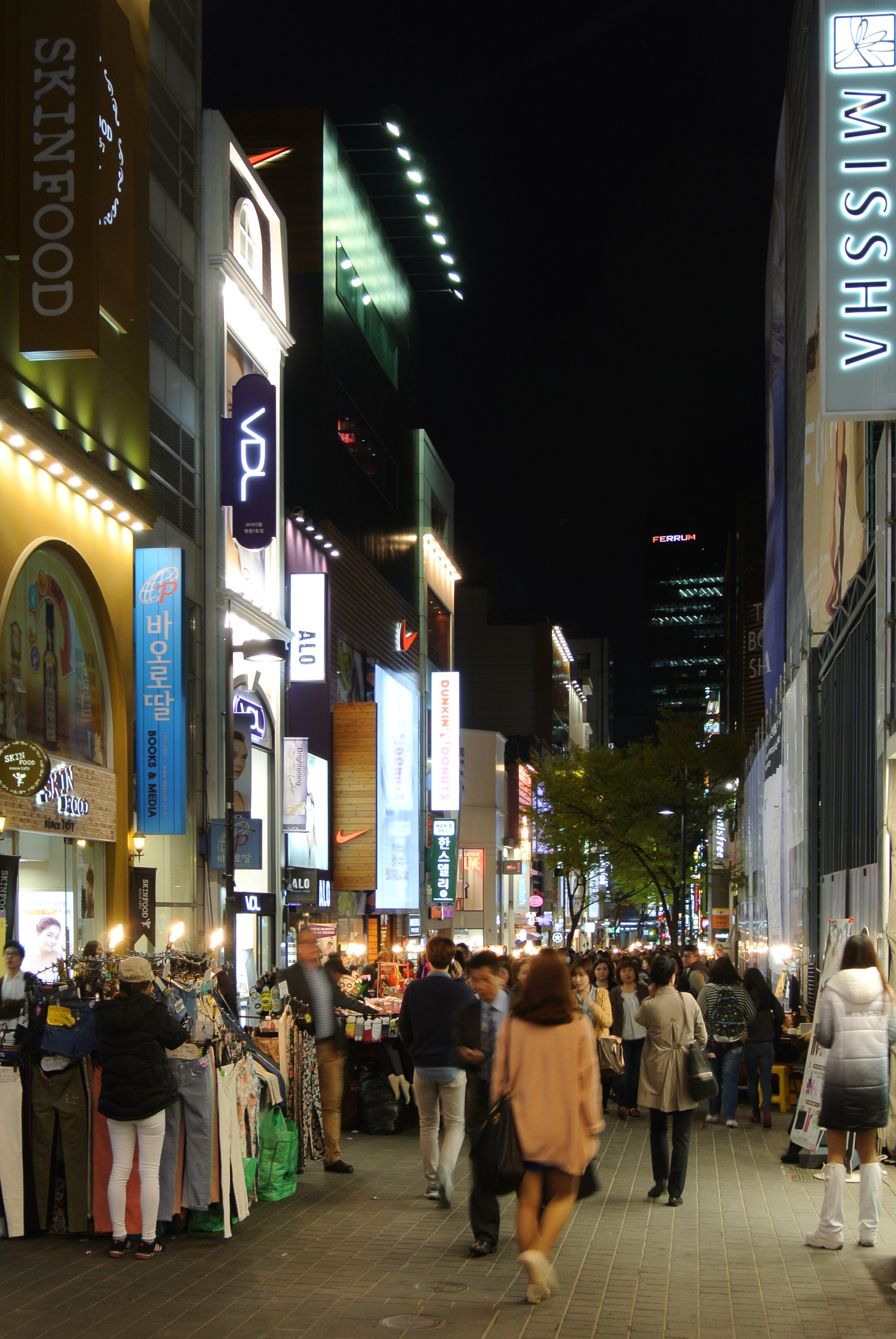
A street in Myeong-dong, Missha store on the right.

== Company ==
In August 2009, the luxury Missha Homme Urban Soul line was launched with higher quality and are more expensive than the existing two men's cosmetic lines.

In August 2012, as part of Lotte Department Store's expansion programme into China, a replica of Seoul's main shopping district Myeong-dong was featured in its new store in Tianjin, with outlets of Missha, The Face Shop and Skin Food.

Missha products range from makeup, skin care, to body and hair products; such as All-Around Safe Block Soft Finish Sun Milk SPF 50, Cool Fitting Body Gel and Hot Burning Body Gel.

Missha is also known for making high quality, lower cost duplications of more expensive brands. For example, the Missha Time Revolution First Treatment Essence is a popular duplication of luxury brand essence SK-II, and the Missha Time Revolution Night Repair Science Activator Ampoule is a popular duplicate of the Estee Lauder Advanced Night Repair.

Missha changed its brand identity at 2018, and its new brand essence is SIMPLE (including the meaning of true, bold, edge).

Based on the cumulative number of customers as of May 2020, MISSHA has around 10 million customers worldwide.

MISSHA has 32,829 stores around the world, most of which are located in Japan (23,000), as of May 2020.

== History ==
2000-2003

- Established company Able C&C Co., Ltd.
- Officially launched MISSHA online brand
- Began its portal Beauty Net
- 2001: Began selling Beautynet products.
- 2002: Officially opened MISSHA's first franchise.
- 2003: Online Beautynet surpassed 10 million of its own users.

2004-2007

- Surpassed 200 Missha franchises.
- Established ABLE C&C USA Corp.
- 2005: Opened its franchise on Fifth Avenue in New York City.
- 2006: First franchise opened in China and Europe
- 2007: Donation event

2008

- Opened its store in Don Quijote shopping mall in Japan.
- Opened its store in Lotte mall in China.
- Opened its store in Dubai mall.

2009

- Opened its first franchise in Romania and Saudi Arabia.
- Opened its franchise in airport Japan.
- Achieve its total sales of ₩181 billion

2010

- 10th Anniversary
- Surpassed 5 million members.
- Opened its first franchise in Venezuela and New Zealand.
- More than 360 franchise opened in China

2011

- Contracted with UNICEF.
- Opened its store in Asiana Airlines.
- Opened its franchise in Russia and Mexico.

2012

- Opened its first store in Brunei

== Spokesmodels ==
- On August 1, 2011, it was announced that South Korean boyband duo TVXQ signed on as advertisement models for Missha in Korea and started their official promotions that month. On choosing TVXQ, Able-CNC Marketing said "TVXQ’s powerful and luxurious image coupled with their passion for bringing new ideas to the stage perfectly fits the brand image of ‘Missha’ to a T. With TVXQ, Missha aims to become a global cosmetic brands in conjunction with the Hallyu wave, and thus become leaders of the international market".
- On 14 August 2012, Missha launched a new limited-edition TVXQ perfume set and had a special fan signing event at the Missha store in Myeong-dong. On September 10, 2012, Missha announced that the duo had again signed an exclusive contract with them to represent the brand worldwide and that their advertisements would soon be featured in some 1,000 stores across Asia.
- 2003 to 2006 and 2013: BoA. Recently Missha was announced that South Korean actor In-seong Jo signed on as advertisement model for Missha in Korea.
- 2015: Go Woo-ri, Oh Seung-ah, Kim Jae-kyung (Rainbow)
- 2016: Park So-dam
- 2017: Shim Eun-kyung
- 2018: Nana, Jeon So-nee
- 2020: Seo Ji-hye
- 2023: Sana (Twice)

== Controversy ==
Original logo

On August 22, 2007, a court ruled Missha was guilty of trademark infringement against Mary Quant Cosmetics. Missha's original flower logo was determined to be too similar to the Mary Quant Daisy logo. Missha was fined ₩3 million and the ruling stated that "Although Missha's trademark combines a diagram and letters and has different colors compared to the trademark of the Mary Quant Cosmetics, there are reasonable concerns that the identical shapes of the diagrams could hurt the brand recognition of the plaintiff and may confuse customers". The company was required to change its logo, because under Korean copyright law, companies cannot use symbols that are similar in shape to a previously registered trademark but only differ in color.

== Closure ==
On January 2, 2015, all 20 Missha stores in Hong Kong and Macau were closed and all staff left the stores the same day. Various notices were posted at the stores, stating that "Missha is no longer available to serve you. We apologize for any inconvenience caused" and "under construction".

According to a local newspaper, Apple Daily, an employee received a WhatsApp message from a head-office colleague at about noon, saying that "The boss is gone. Everyone can leave." As reported, Missha owes the former staff over HK$1 million for salary and severance payments.
