= Cosmetics in Korea =

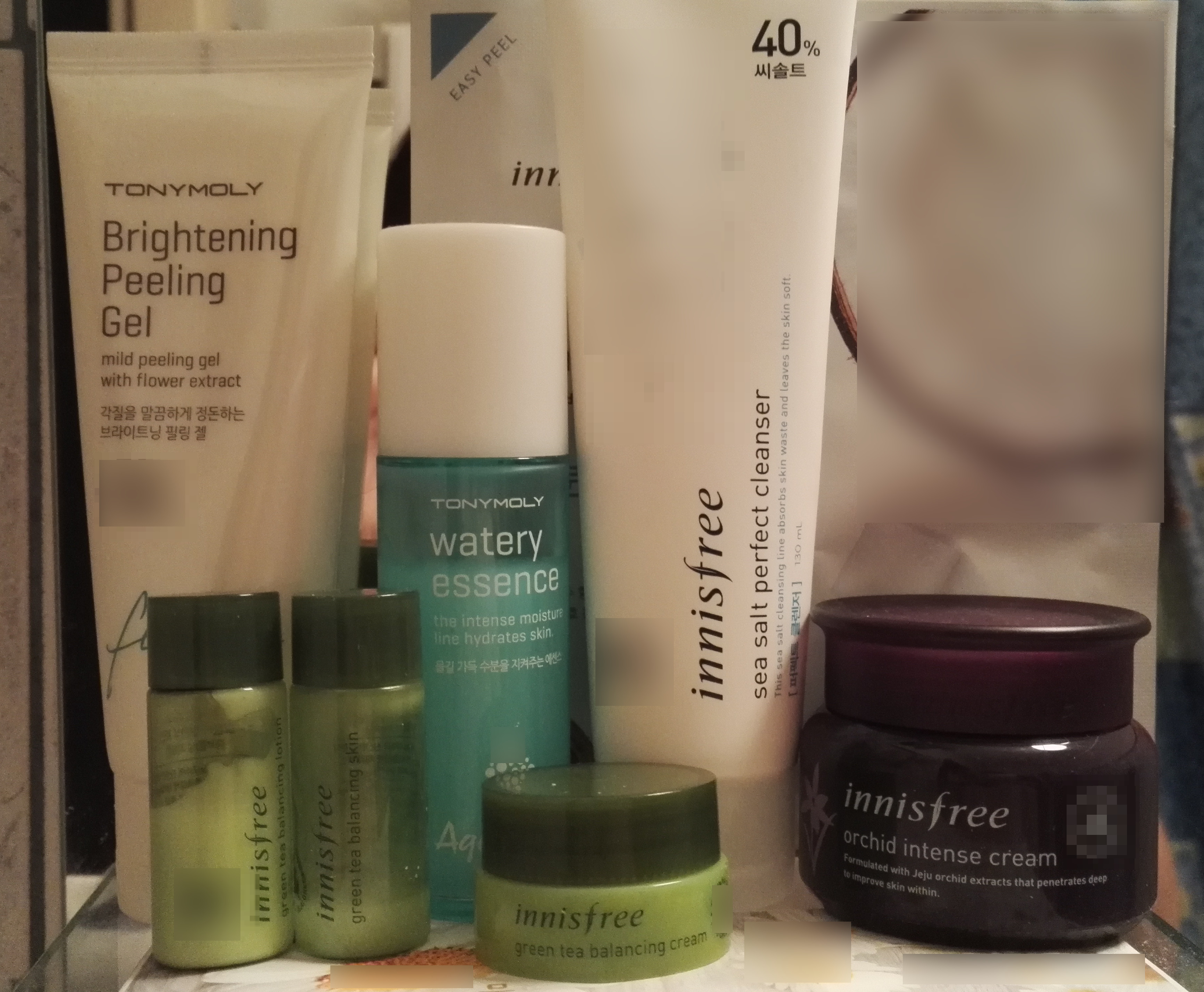
Various Korean cosmetics products (peeling gel, essence, cleanser, toner, lotion and two types of creams) on a bathroom shelf

Cosmetics have been used in Korea since antiquity. Today, cosmetics are an important industry in South Korea.

== History ==
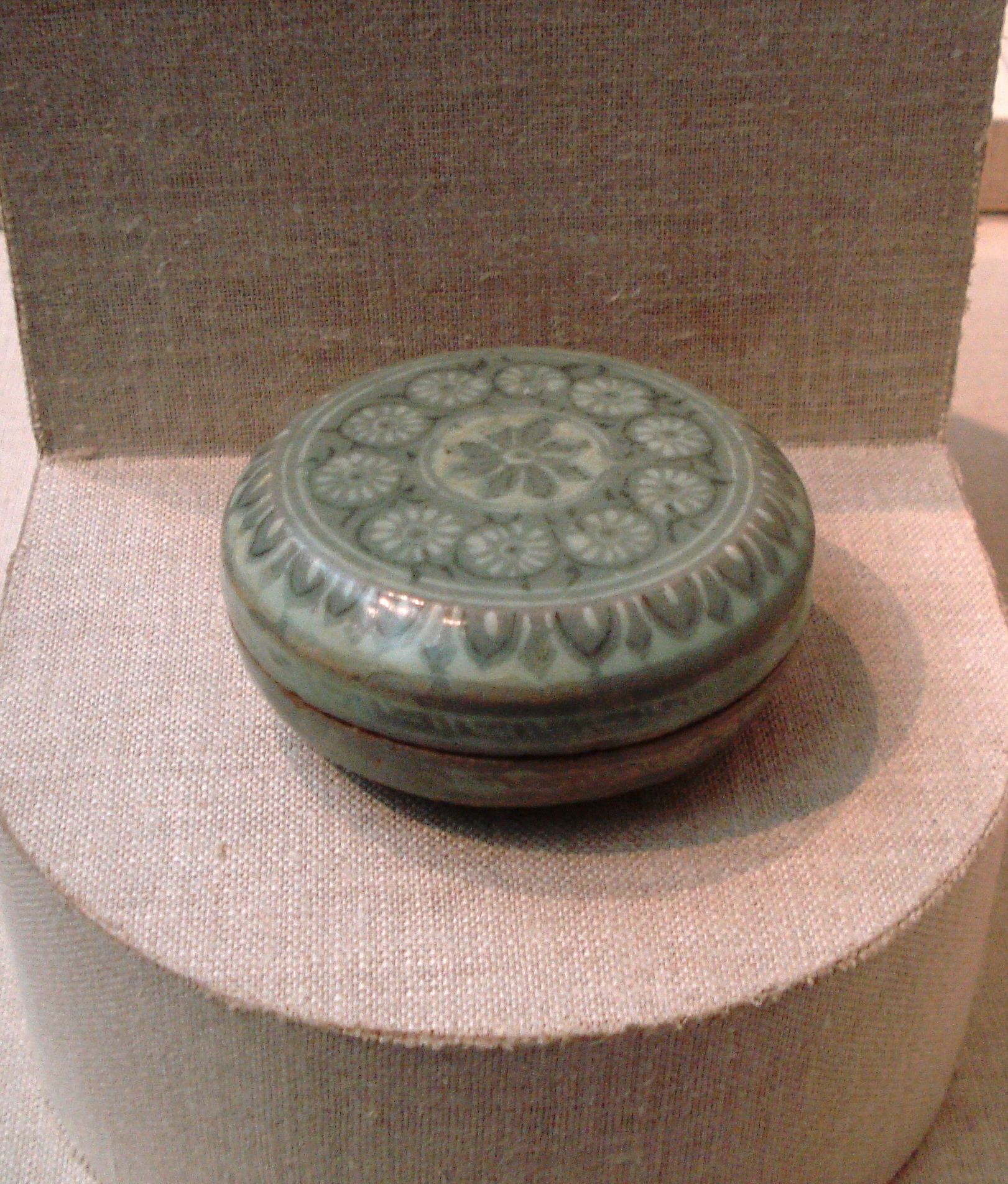
Goryeo dynasty cosmetic box

=== Ancient times ===
Records of the use of cosmetics in Korea date back to the time of the Three Kingdoms of Korea, and the use of makeup flourished during the Goryeo kingdom. Cosmetics were made from lotions extracted from plants, including gourd stems; Ground mung bean contains saponin and was helpful for cleansing. Castor oils and camellia oils were used as hair oil. They had a pleasant smell and were not sticky.

To moisturise and add gloss to the skin, safflower oil was used. Apricot and peach oils were used to remove freckles and liver spots. A kind of powder called 'mibun' or 'baekbun' was made from ground rice and millet blended with water or oil.

Scents were added to extracts from grains and other plants, for example, from dried clove buds. Perfume was also used to relieve stress and tiredness. The Gyuhap Chongseo, an ancient women's encyclopedia, includes various methods for making perfume.

According to Gyuhap Chongseo, eyebrows were the central feature of a woman's face. The work describes ten popular eyebrow shapes. Crescent or willow leaf shapes were the most popular. Plant ash was the basic raw material used for eyebrow ink, with which women drew their eyebrows in various shapes. The primary colors were black, blue, and dark brown.

Yeonji is the Korean name of rouge, which was used to colour the lips and cheeks. It could be made from safflower.

In the Joseon period, luxurious makeup was forbidden because of Confucianism. Upper-class women tended to copy the makeup and style of gisaeng during this period.

=== Modern times ===
Following the Treaty of Kanghwa in 1876, Korean ports opened to foreign trade and Western styles began to influence the country. New makeup styles and products became popular, stimulating Korea's cosmetics culture and enabling mass production and consumption.

Bakgabun, which means Park's powder, was the first mass-produced cosmetic item in Korea. It was the first Korean face powder and was a bestseller from 1916 to 1930. However, because of its lead content, sales then fell rapidly, and similar products were quickly launched.

As Korea became a Japanese colony in 1910, Japanese cosmetics dominated, and Korean cosmetics failed to develop in the 1920s. After the country was no longer under Japanese control, the Korean War that began in 1950 further disrupted the economy. Finally, around 1961, the Korean cosmetics industry began to prosper after the passage of a law banning sale of other countries.

At the end of the 2010s, South Korea banned cosmetics for which animal testing was conducted.

== Cosmetics and skincare in South Korean culture ==
Korean people focus on skin care under the influence of TV programs, advertisements and tradition. Many Koreans highly value even, radiant skin, and some Korean women tend to vary their beauty care regimen with the season. They use different kinds of moisturizers, such as cream for tightening pores (BB cream, blemish balm or beauty balm) and lotions for lightening the skin (CC cream, colour correction or colour control).

Many Koreans apply makeup every day because it offers sun protection, a major concern. A big focus of Korean skincare is skin lightening, which is why many Korean cosmetic products have brightening properties. Skin brightening is not the same as skin bleaching, also known as skin whitening, which is a reduction of melanin in the skin. Instead, skin lightening is focused on treating hyperpigmentation.

The country's beauty standards have changed in recent years. Advertisers have reduced the promotion of "glass skin" in their products as well as the industry has also started to be utilized by male consumers. Overall, Korean beauty has gained popularity through the Korean wave, and has resulted in a worldwide phenomenon.

Korean men are also interested in skincare. Some use BB or CC cream. Cosmetics manufactured specifically for men in South Korea focus on soothing the skin after daily shaving.

== Industry ==
South Korea is home to several large cosmetic brands, many of which export their products worldwide. They include:

- Amorepacific, with brands including Laneige, Etude House, Innisfree, Sulwhasoo and Mamonde
- LG Household & Health Care, with brands including Ĭsa Knox and The Face Shop
- Nature Republic

== See also ==
- Coreana Cosmetic Museum
- K-Beauty
