= Women in Hong Kong =

General statistics
- Maternal mortality (per 100,000): NA (2010)
- Women in parliament: 15.7% (2012)
- Women over 25 with secondary education: 68.7% (2010)
- Women in labour force: 51.0% (2011)

Gender Inequality Index
- Value: NR (2012)
- Rank: NR

Global Gender Gap Index
- Value: NR (2012)
- Rank: NR

Traditionally, women in Hong Kong have been situated within the context of Chinese family and society, in which they were treated the same as Mainland women or Taiwanese women. However, there are cultural differences between Mainland Chinese citizens and citizens of Hong Kong. During the British colonial period, the emergence of Western culture (i.e. "Westernization") created a mix of traditional Chinese culture and Western values. This created a unique culture of Hong Kong. Along with the rapid economic and social development of Hong Kong since the end of the Second World War, there has been a significant improvement in the social status of women. However, the male-dominant social structure still persists in some aspects of women's lives.

During the past three decades, women in Hong Kong have become more financially independent, assertive, and career-focused. With the increased number of women in professional and managerial positions in recent decades, especially since the enactment of anti-discrimination laws since the mid-1990s, the terms "female strong person" or "superwomen" are being used to describe women in Hong Kong.

== Gender inequality ==
Statistical data from the Hong Kong national census in 2006 shows that the number of women in Hong Kong is increasing, while the number of men in Hong Kong is declining. The figure for single Hong Kong women living alone increased to 43.8 percent compared with 2001, with 103,938 in 1996, 127,001 in 2001, and 182,648, in 2006. The gender ratio between men and women as of 2006 was at 1,000 females for every 912 males; in 2016 it had risen to 1000 females for every 852 males. It is expected to deteriorate further by 2036 (1,000 females for every 763 males). The increase of single women in Hong Kong is significant because it is proven that single women's employment patterns are similar to men's in nature.

=== Education ===
See also Economy of Hong Kong and Education in Hong Kong.

During the early twentieth century, some women pursued advanced education in Hong Kong. From 1921 to 1941, St. Stephen's Girls' College in educated young women in science and social service, aiming to prepare a class of career women for modern China.

The implementation of compulsory universal education in 1971, followed by an extension to nine years in 1978, gave rise to an increased number of women elites. The transformation of the social environment in Hong Kong also contributed to the rise of women's education. Historically, families that did not have enough money to send both their son and daughter to school would choose to educate the son over the daughter. Following economic growth in the 1960s, Hong Kong has become a wealthy society with a significant change in population. The birth rate in Hong Kong steadily decreased from 16.8% in 1981 to 8.6% in 2014. It shows that the nuclear family structure nurturing only one to two children in a family is common, therefore girls can receive better education due to the more concentrated resources within the family.

According to the report of Hong Kong Annual Digest of Statistics by Census and Statistics Department of Hong Kong, a trend of universalism for boys and girls has been observed since the 1970s. Girls' enrolment rate, in general, has been higher than the boys' since the 1980s. The gap between male and female enrollment in post-secondary education has narrowed, and female students outnumber male students entering the University Grants Committee (UGC) funded programs in recent decades. The percentage of female and male students enrolled in UGC-funded programs was 53.7% and 46.3% respectively in 2014, which is quite different from 32.9% and 67.1% respectively in 1987.

However, when specifically focusing on research postgraduate programs, more male students have been recorded, largely due to the fact that programmes are largely related to sciences, technology, engineering and mathematics (STEM). People in Hong Kong have a gender bias in STEM fields, perceiving women as less capable of mastering STEM knowledge and pursuing related careers. Half of the teenage girls in Hong Kong were discouraged from focussing on mathematics and sciences during secondary school, which lead to their lessened self-concept in STEM. Thus, the sex ratio of students enrolled in UGC-funded engineering and technology programs is an imbalance, at 29.5% for females and 70.5% for males in 2016. The situation is not much improved from 1996, which had 14.1% for females and 85.9% for males.

=== Career attainment ===
External videos
- Apple Daily – Married Hong Kong women want to work YouTube video

Women were in the workforce as early as the 1920s, but the small population often had to fight for equality of work rights. With the shift of Hong Kong's economy from the manufacturing industry in the 1980s to services industry, there is a growing demand for white collar workers. Abundant job opportunities are therefore available for both men and women. Employment in Hong Kong can be enjoyed by women, who possess rights such as maternity protection and sick leave. Nevertheless, women in Hong Kong are aware of the difficulties they face in being a woman in the workforce. For example, when surveyed, both men and women working in Hong Kong stated that they preferred to have a male supervisor over a woman supervisor.

In 2016, there were 49.3% females and 50.8% males in the employed population. In spite of the open-minded and relatively westernised culture of Hong Kong, the seemingly equal and fair workplace still poses obstacles on the way of women's career paths. 61.8% of females and 51.6% of males agreed that women have to sacrifice more than men for career success. 72.1% of females agreed that an increasing number of successful women is a positive social phenomenon, while only 59.6% of males shared the same view. The data showed that men, having the invisible privilege obtained from unequal gender perceptions, are content with the current situation and are more reluctant of the rising status of women, which might pose a threat to their career prospects.

The Hong Kong media clearly reflects the social stereotypes and norms. Performers of authority roles are mostly men, with commentaries and voice-overs mainly heard in male voices as well. Women are chiefly depicted in domestic roles and gender-specific professions, for example, secretaries and nurses.

Despite the high education level and prospective vision women possess, it is uncommon to see women working on Hong Kong corporate boards and in senior management roles. Women account for only 11% of the total director pool of Hong Kong's listed issuers, and 33% of senior management roles. The number of female workers participating in the labour force, which is 54% of the entire female population, lags behind many developed countries (67.6% in the US and 71% in the UK). The number of women in politics is also small. In the legislative council, there are only 12 female members among the 70 elected members. Comparing to 10 female members among the 60 elected members in 1998, women are remain under-represented in the legislative stage of the city, and such inadequacy will lead to prolonged suppression in women's rights and gender inequality. According to a 2021 report by the Credit Suisse Research Institute, women comprise 13.7% of company boardrooms in Hong, which is lower than the global average of 24%. The global average is up from 15.1% in 2015.

=== Family life ===
As part of the Chinese family traditions, a woman's duty within the household is to serve her family, in particular the men, with her role having long been based on the expectation of her serving her father as a child, her husband throughout her married life, and her son(s) when she reaches old age. The traditional role of men is to deal with external matters within the public sphere, whereas that of women is to remain in the private sphere at home and care for their children. Due to the traditional belief of male superiority within Hong Kong, there is a lot of pressure placed upon women to produce male offspring, irrelevant of her economic status and level of education. Until recently, women who were unable to bear a son to her family were viewed as defective and were often divorced.

The necessity of building a family, an important Chinese social value cultivated by the Confucian ideology, has reduced in popularity in recent years, as a considerable proportion of the population found singlehood comfortable. 42.3% males and 41.5% females are not planning to get married, outnumbering those who disagree (31.4% males and 32.3% females). A survey demonstrated a low desire to have children among the unmarried, with 22.1% females and 21.5% males disagreeing that life was empty without having a child. However, when discussing unmarried cohabitation, opinions diverged between males and females. Regarding the idea of coexistence without the intention of marriage, 71% of never-married males found it acceptable, but only 45.1% of never-married females agreed. It indicated that sexual integrity remains of relatively high importance among women in Hong Kong.

Along with the changing view on marriage and reproduction, the gender division of labor within a family has changed as well. The traditional picture that men are the financial backbones of the family and primarily deal with external affairs is no longer the mainstream perception. More than 50% of respondents reckoned that males no longer hold a dominant and superior figure within the family. Over 80% of the respondents agreed that contribution to household income should be made from both partners. The unequal division of labour in family affairs has also made gradual progress towards equal roles; about 50% of the respondents believed men should be more involved in household duties, and 43% of males agreed that men should take on more responsibilities in child-caring. As the society gained acceptance of changing family roles, the number of full-time male homemakers has grown from 2.9 thousand in 1991 (0.13% of the male population) to 19 thousand in 2016, taking up 0.65% of the male population. On the other hand, there was a substantial decrease in the number of full-time female homemakers, with numbers dropping from 752.8 thousand in 1991 (34.4% of the entire female population) to 628.1 thousand in 2016, downsizing to 18% of the female population. The statistics demonstrate the moderately reducing gap between men and women in household affairs.

Although social phenomenon grew in favour of gender equality in the family, the gender stereotypes in the division of household work remain rooted. According to the survey, half of the respondents considered women's major job to be family rather than work, and about 40% of the respondents agreed that providing income is men's work and household work is a women's job. Indeed, women are still largely responsible for household duties, with 70.6% of females accountable for child caring. Chores of daily life are mainly women's duties, whereas men assume the household duties by handling minor repairs.

There is a growing number of working mothers in society. Although career is a kind of financial empowerment for women, the double shift (career and housework) becomes a serious burden for them to carry. Not only do the double burdens harm women, it also harms the relationship between working mothers and their children. A working mother has less leisure time to stay with their children and therefore cannot be aware of some developmental problems during the children's growth. For example, when their children suffer from mental illness, working mothers are less able to articulate the symptoms of their children. Because so many women feel that caring for their children is strictly their responsibility, they rarely go to their husbands for additional help. This creates issues for women who work outside of their homes. To tackle the problem of domestic burden for working mothers, many families hire a domestic helper; the outsourced domestic work brings changes to the family structure. Some people think that hiring a domestic worker has an impact on marital conflict and marital quality, however research shows that hiring domestic help makes no significant difference to marital conflict and quality. In Hong Kong, women tend to work outside to focus on their career development and hire a domestic helper to ease their double burdens.

Women may suffer from multi-roles in which they cannot shift to the right role at home and workplace. To deal with those negative effects, the boundary-spanning resources that help to meet the demand of each domain are helpful to improve overall working families. There are some policies that have been launched that work to ease the double burden from the "working mother". For example, flexible working hours and supportive workplace culture can improve the family well-being of employees.

=== Marriage and the workforce ===
A large number of women will enter into the labour force following their education, but traditionally there was a substantial dropout rate after marriage and/or childbearing, due to the sense of obligation that women felt for their families and households. As a result of this, many women quit their occupations. In addition to this, until the 1970s the marriage bar was widely applied to women employees in Hong Kong. From the mid-1990s through to the 21st century, Hong Kong has enacted several laws prohibiting employment discrimination, including discrimination based on sex and marital status.

In Hong Kong, the trend is that both males and females are getting married later in life. This is mainly due to the desire to be more independent, not just in the business world, but in all areas of life. Traditionally, women have been underestimated and viewed as inadequate members of society. As a result, they have a harder time getting hired by major companies and are less able to contribute monetarily to their families. By delaying marriage, women are more likely to pursue full-time and higher paying occupations. Hong Kong has one of the lowest total fertility rate in the world, 1.18 children/per woman, which is far below the replacement rate of 2.1. Hong Kong, like other developed nations in Asia, such as Japan and South Korea, has a strong tradition of women being housewives after marriage, but since the 1990s this has been challenged. As of 2011, the labour force participation rate for never married women was 67.2%, while for ever married women, it was only 46.8%.

Marriage in Hong Kong is becoming based on personal happiness and romantic satisfaction, as opposed to the traditional marriage based on duty and the expectation to stay with one's spouse regardless of the situation. Women now have more of a say in who they wish to marry, and if the marriage does not work out according to plan, they are able to openly consider divorce. Traditional marriage values are becoming less important and divorce has become more common and socially acceptable. Consequently, more individuals in Hong Kong are single than ever before. However, in China, marriage is based on strong family ties and relationships, despite any lack of romance. Therefore, if one were to propose divorce, he or she would risk losing all contact with the family. As of 2011, 49.0% of women were married, 8.7% of women were widowed, 4.4% of women were divorced, 0.6% of women were separated, and 37.3% of women had never been married.

== Political participation and leadership ==
It is a global phenomenon that women lag behind in political participation and the statistics obtained by Inter-Parliamentary Union in 2016 showed that only 22.8% of all national parliamentarians were women. Gender Empowerment Measure (GEM) was designed by United Nations (UN) to measure gender equality through looking at women's opportunities in political participation and their economic power. Since there is no parliamentary data in Hong Kong, Women's Commission calculated GEM in 2005 by using the number of female Legislative Council members to replace the number of female parliamentary members. The GEM of Hong Kong was 0.717 which ranked 19th among 109 countries, reflecting that there are greater opportunities for women in political and economic arenas compared with other Asian countries like Japan (54th) and South Korea (64th).

Although the gender gap is still wide in the political sector, gradual improvement can be seen. Executive Council is the highest authority in policy-making in Hong Kong, in which female members were slightly increased from 16% in 2007 to 26% in 2015. In 2004, Home Affairs Bureau set a target of raising female ratios in advisory and statutory bodies to at least 25%, which then successfully lead to the increased percentage of female members from 22.6% in 2003 to 32.3% in 2014. As for women being elected in Legislative Council, 22% and 18% were recorded in 2004 and 2012 respectively, which shows a small decline. Similarly, female secretaries account for only 20% among 13 policy bureaus in 2012.

Concerning women's leadership outside the governmental sector, the imbalanced sex ratios of the leading position in the enterprise world are even more serious than in government, with only one female in a chief executive role among 42 listed companies. In the judicial field, judges in the Court of Final Appeal are all male, while female judges only account for 15.2% in the High Court.

=== Obstacles in attaining leadership position ===
In gender division of labor, women are expected to be the homemaker even though some of them are the breadwinner at the same time, meaning it can be difficult for them to strike a balance between family and work. Getting promoted is accompanied by more time devoted to the workplace, which places women at a disadvantage since they need to fulfill household responsibility as well. The situation might be even worse in the finance and business industry which require longer working hours to handle fierce competition. Therefore, many women would give up senior positions to maintain the balance between family and workplace.

A lot of people in Hong Kong still uphold the traditional gender ideology that men's status should always be superior to women's. According to the survey conducted by the Women's Commission in 2010, 36.8% of females and 32.8% of males reported that patriarchal supremacy still exists in their family. In this case, the role of being a female leader might threaten their spouses' power in the relationship. In addition to this, 46.1% of males and 32.3% of females agreed that male political leaders would do much better than females. This gendered perception might discourage women from competing in higher positions with men.

Moreover, glass ceiling also hinders women from reaching the top position. The job segregation by sex restricts women into certain types of job like clerical work. This limits their work experience and thus makes it harder to get promoted. Even though some women are capable enough to move upward, the old-boy network excludes women from decision-making.

== Violence against women ==
Violence against women is gender-based violence happening in both public and private life that targets women due to their sex or social roles and possibly leads to physical, sexual and psychological harm. International violence against women survey (IVAWS) revealed that the violence rates in Hong Kong are 19.9% which is ranked low as compared with countries like Australia (57%) and Denmark (50%).

Intimate partner violence (IPV) is the most common form of violence against women, involving harmful behaviors such as walloping and resources blockade exerted by a current or ex-spouse in marriage, a cohabitant or a partner in a dating relationship. Although several researchers have investigated gender symmetry of IPV by saying that both men and women would have the chance of suffering from violence, obvious gender differences still exist in Hong Kong as there are more reported cases of violence exerted by men than women. According to statistics from the Social Welfare Department, there were 3,917 reported cases of being physically abused by spouse or cohabitant, in which 83% of victims were women while only 17% were men. The abuses largely came from husband (62.8%), followed by the opposite-sex of cohabiting partner (13.4%) and wife (12.6%). In terms of sexual violence, there were 343 newly reported cases in 2010, in which 98.8% were female victims mostly suffering from indecent assault (70.8%). Factors commonly observed in China, contributing to domestic violence, encompass low socioeconomic status, power disparities between partners, marital conflicts, adherence to traditional gender roles, and the involvement of alcohol or illicit drugs.

Sex trafficking in Hong Kong is an issue. Hongkonger and foreign women and girls are forced into prostitution in brothels, homes, and businesses in the city.

=== Under-reporting of victimized cases ===
The reported cases of violence against women or men cannot fully reveal the situation in Hong Kong because there are still many cases being hidden by victims. Under the influence of the traditional patriarchal system, women might internalize their submissive role and therefore are less likely to challenge the status quo, resist against IPV or other forms of violence by non-partners, or seek help from society. Victims of sexual violence are sometimes labelled as shameful and dirty due to the sexual taboo in Hong Kong affected by the Chinese traditional value of chastity, resulting in women's fear of reporting the unpleasant violence. Another Chinese value of "Don't spread abroad the shame of the family" also leads to the absence of women's disclosure on their experienced violence by a partner or other family members, in order to protect their family reputation.

In 2006, Tarana Burke coined the phrase "Me Too" as a way to help women who had survived sexual violence. It quickly spread on the internet as a movement all over the world and Hong Kong also joined in the movement with the news of a Hong Kong hurdler Vera Lui Lai-yiu accusing her former coach of sexually assaulting her. Her coach, according to Lui, sexually assaulted her 10 years ago during her primary school age. The joining of a public figure into the movement encouraged more victims of sexual harassment to open up on the internet or ask for help from organizations. Association Concerning Sexual Violence Against Women in Hong Kong reports a rapid rise in several assistance call from alleged sexual harassment victims since Lui's post on Facebook. Many victims may begin to take the case seriously and try to ask for help from others. The viral 'Me Too' movement, to a certain extent, helps females to gain right in going against sexual violence.

Nonetheless, the movement is considered a failure in Hong Kong with people speculating whether the case Lui mentioned in her post is true. Many on the internet express disbelieve in Lui's description and instead think that she is lying. Lui was suspected of trying to create a story and gain fame.

=== Risk factors of potential violence toward women ===
Women with a lack of resources, such as education and income, are more likely to suffer from IPV. Since they have to rely on their husband or partner to receive financial support for daily expenditure, they tend to tolerate the violence and not to resist. The situation might be even worse for married women with children because they have a stronger desire to maintain marriage to get stable monetary support and let their children grow in a healthy family environment. However, resourceful women are also vulnerable to violence if their husband or partner strongly upholds the traditional gender ideology. In Hong Kong, men are expected to be masculine by being the main breadwinner in the family. When the husband owns fewer resources and earns less than their wife do, their masculinity will be challenged. Therefore, they are more likely to protect their remaining ego by exerting violence on women to show other forms of masculinity and power. It shows the interplay between social status, gender ideology, masculinity and violent behaviors.

Besides new immigrants brought by cross-border marriage, husband's unemployment and economic pressure, pregnancy and extramarital affairs are also found to be the risk factors of potential violence toward women in Hong Kong.

== LGBT and women's rights movements ==
Since 1991, the LGBT movement in Hong Kong began the decriminalization of homosexuality. The Women's Coalition of Hong Kong is an LBGT organization that was founded in 2002. This group was responsible for drafting the government's Sex Discrimination bill in 1995, which advocated for women's legal, political, and economic rights.

== Gallery ==
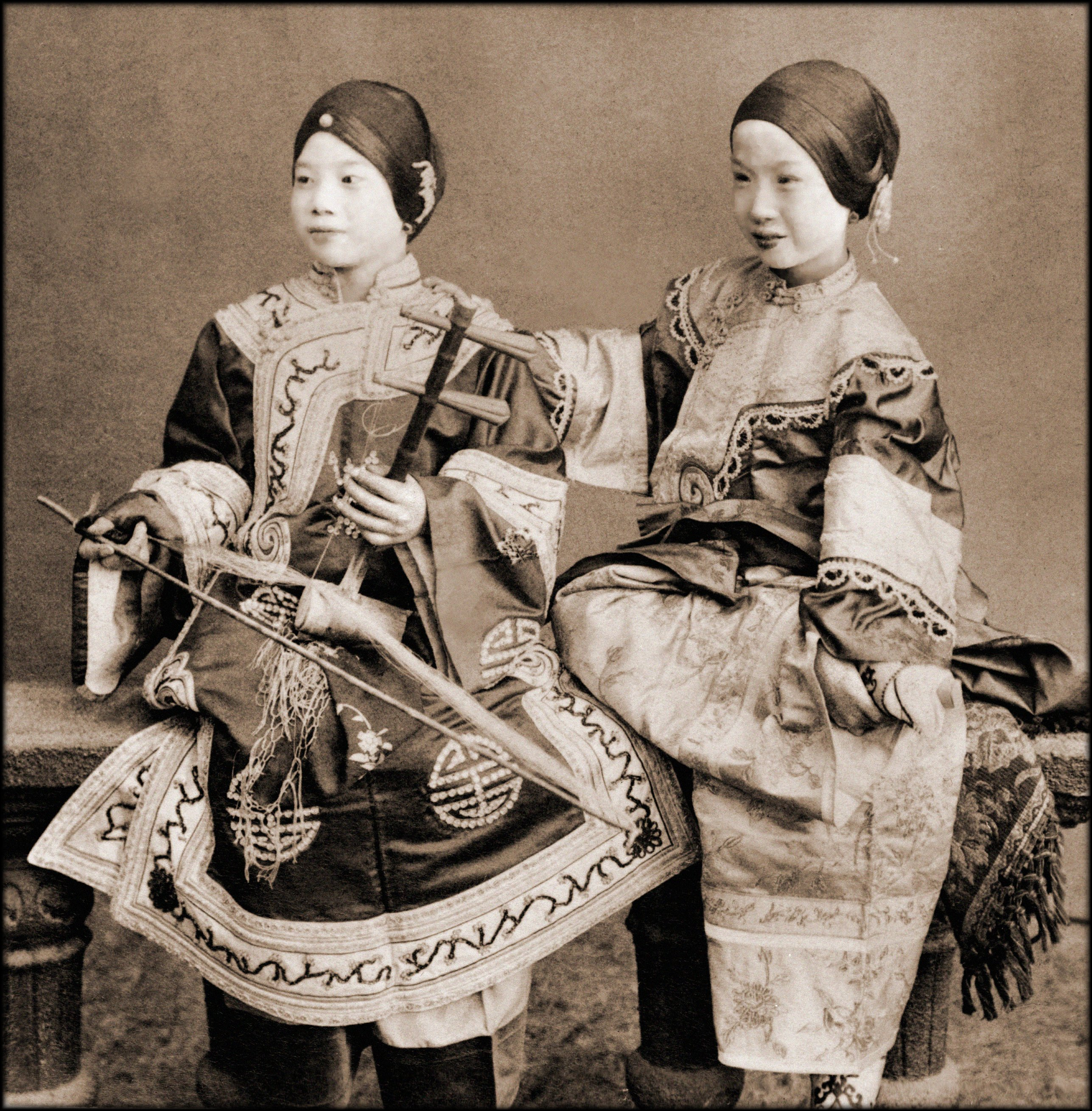
Singing Girls, Hong Kong (c. 1901)

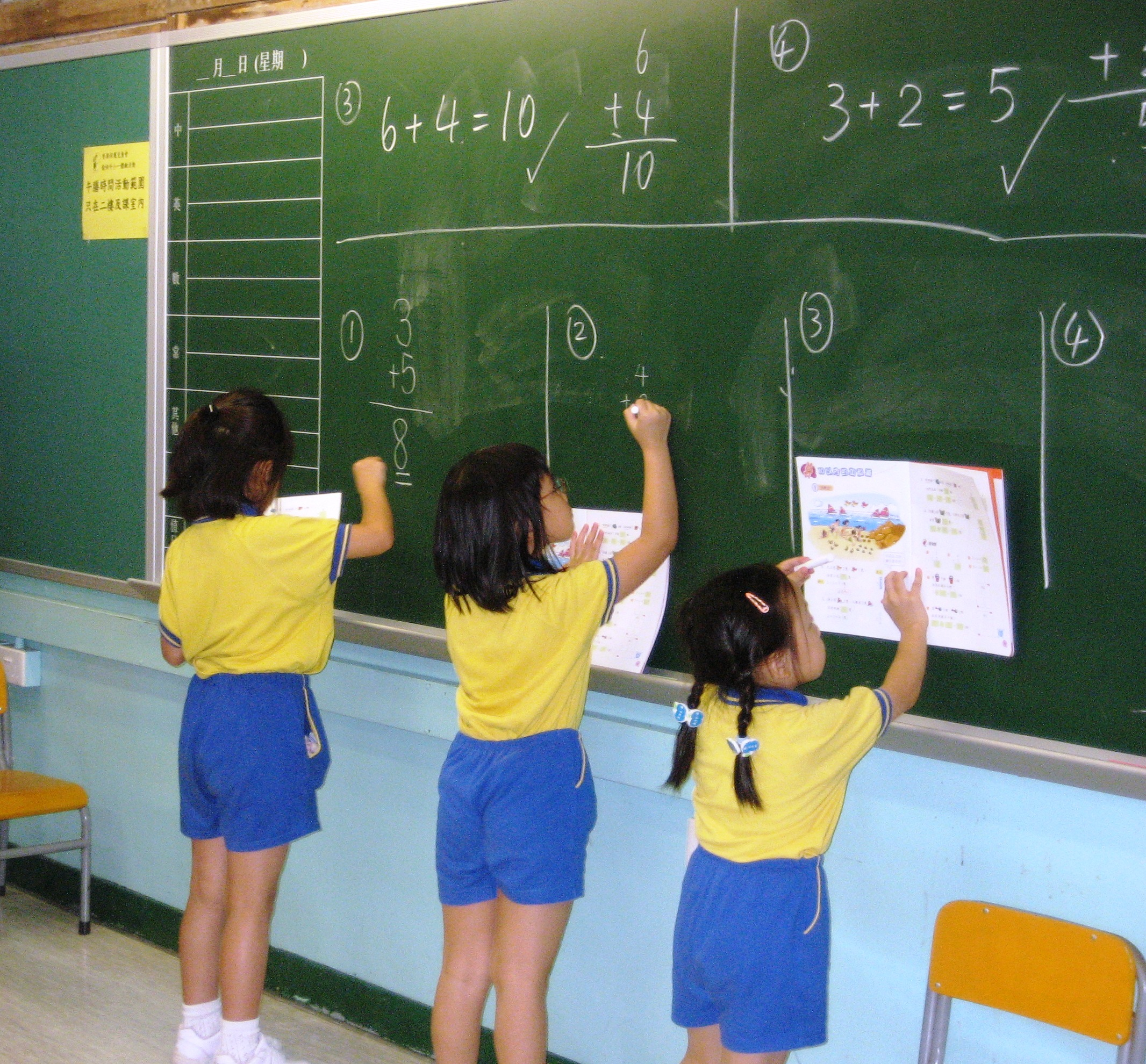
School girls writing on the blackboard

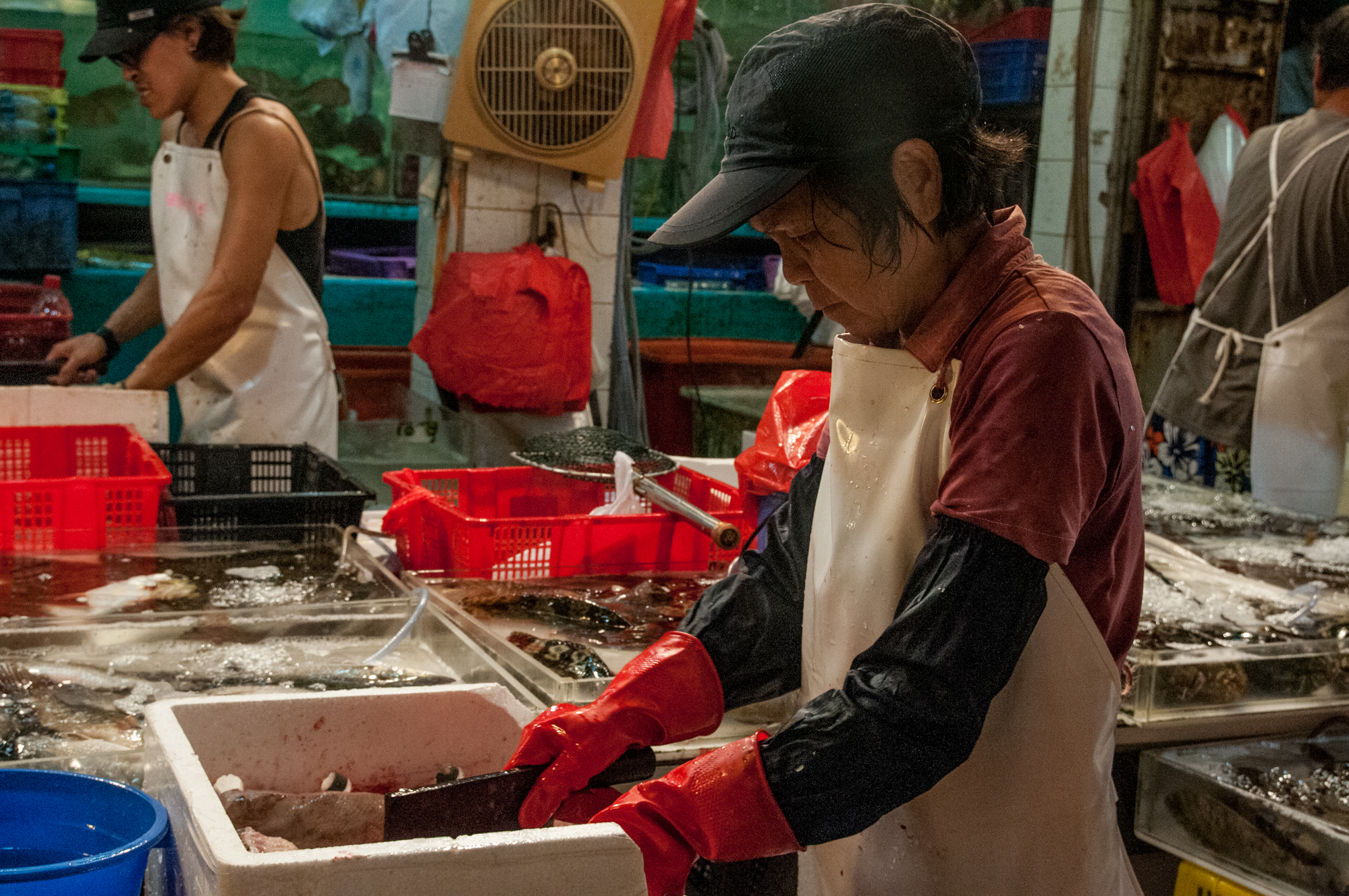
Fisherwoman Seller

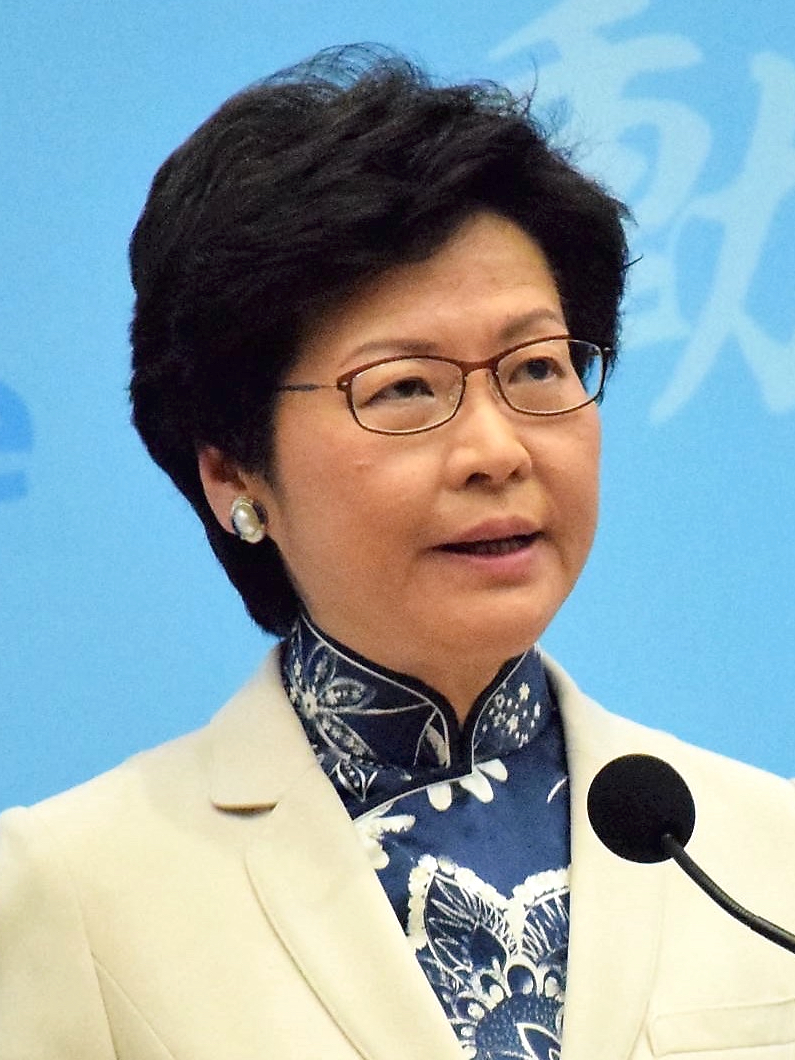
Carrie Lam, first female Chief Executive of Hong Kong

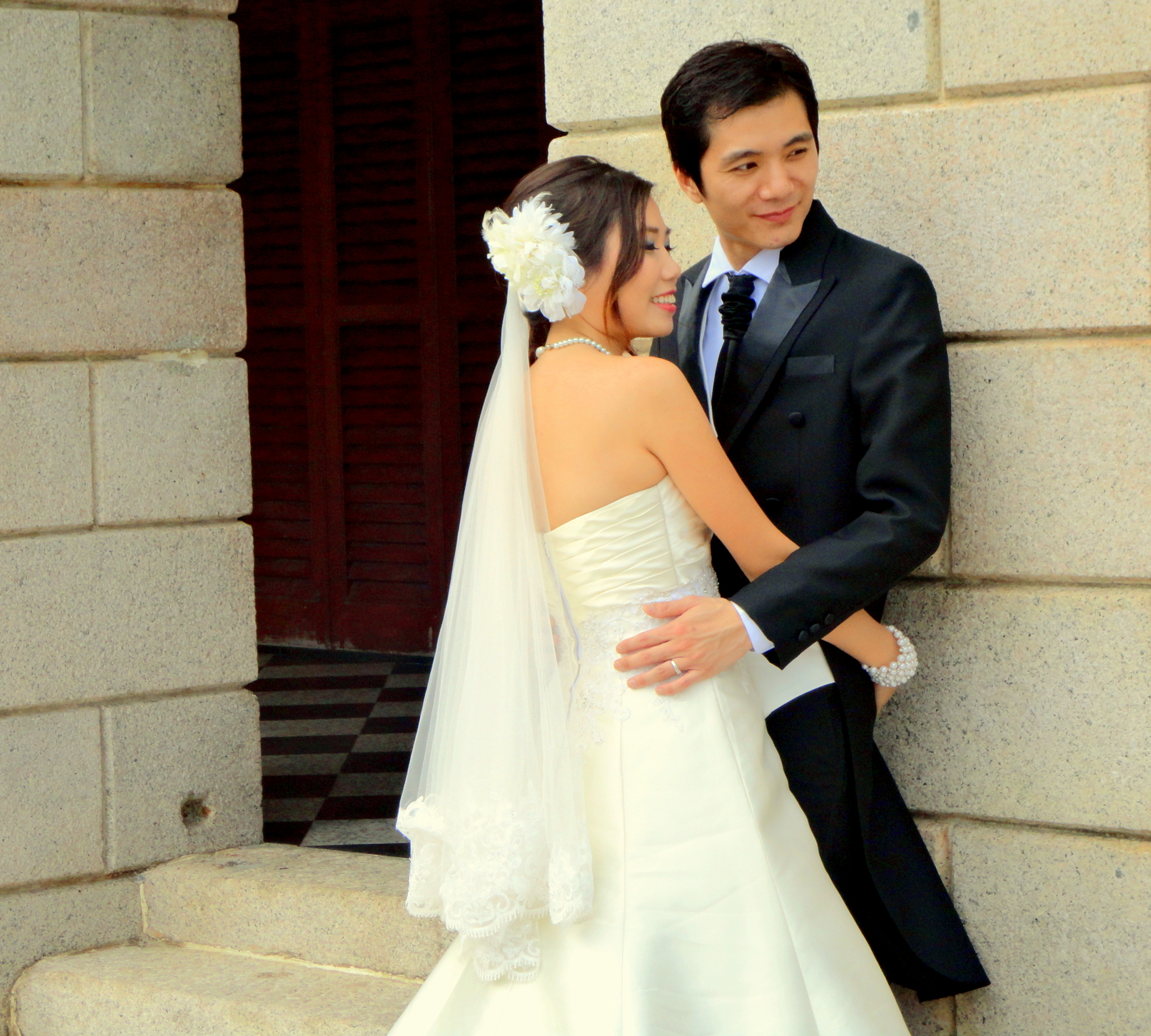
Bride with groom

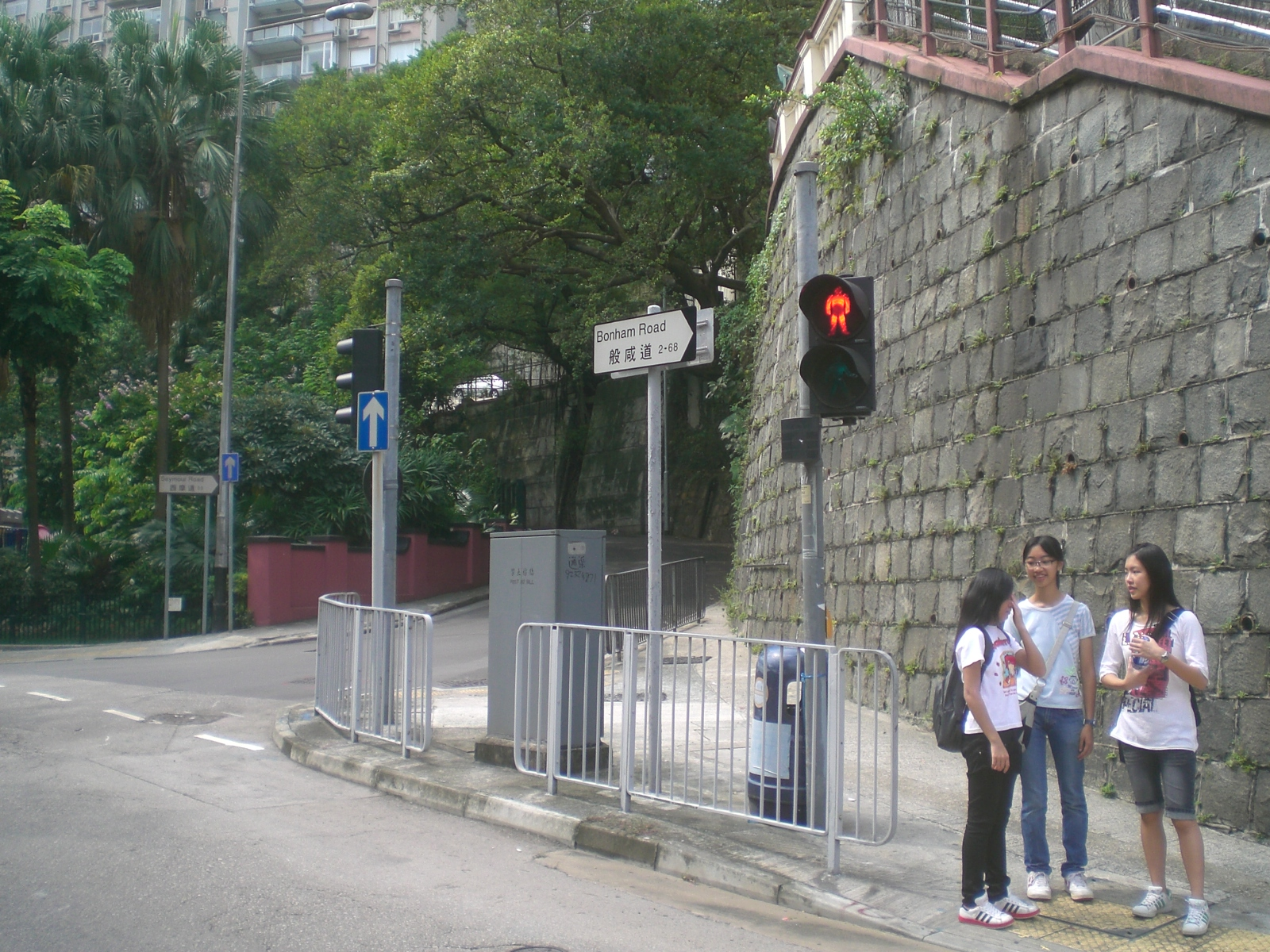
Teenage girls on Bonham Road

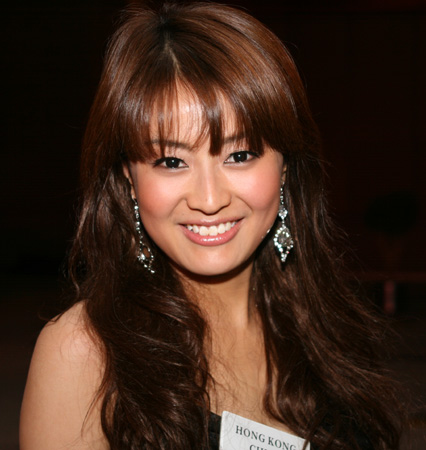
Skye Chan, actress

== See also ==
- Nowhere girls, neologism
- British Hong Kong
- Women in Asia
