= Coreana (disambiguation) =

Coreana is a gossamer-winged butterfly genus.

It may also refer to:

- Coreana (company), a South Korean company, linked to the Coreana Cosmetic Museum in Seoul
- "Corana", a Geographic Beanie Baby toy

== See also ==
- Ulmus parvifolia var. coreana, the Korean elm
