= Chinese ideals of female beauty =

Beauty standards within China or overseas Chinese communities

Female beauty standards have become a well-known feature of Chinese culture. A 2018 survey conducted by the Great British Academy of Aesthetic Medicine concluded that Chinese beauty culture prioritizes an oval face shape, pointed, narrow chin, red lips, well defined Cupid's bows, and an obtuse jaw angle. The importance of feminine beauty in China has been deeply ingrained into the culture: historically, a woman's livelihood was often determined by her ability to find an eligible husband, a feat aided by fitting into the cultural ideals of beauty.

Black hair that is long, thick and shiny is seen as particularly beautiful among Chinese women. Similarly, pale, ivory skin, and a slim body figure have historical implications as being a physical representation of wealth and affluence.

A relatively new ideal ingrained into Chinese culture consists of the notion of having a double eyelid. The term double eyelid refers to the prominent crease natural to approximately 66.7% and 83.1% of Chinese women. For the minority that does not naturally have them, this look can be achieved temporarily by using specific cosmetic products such as tape or glue. A permanent option is to undergo a procedure titled blepharoplasty, which utilizes cosmetic surgery to reshape the eyelid.

As China welcomed more Western influence in the late 1970s, rejection of traditional beauty standards alongside a wave of negative body image simultaneously arose. Hierarchy and patriarchy have remained part of Chinese society, where pressure to be beautiful is now in the name of society becoming developed and modern.

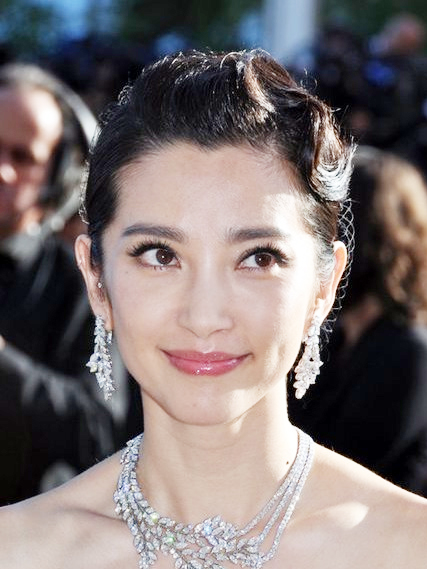
Li Bingbing, a Chinese actress

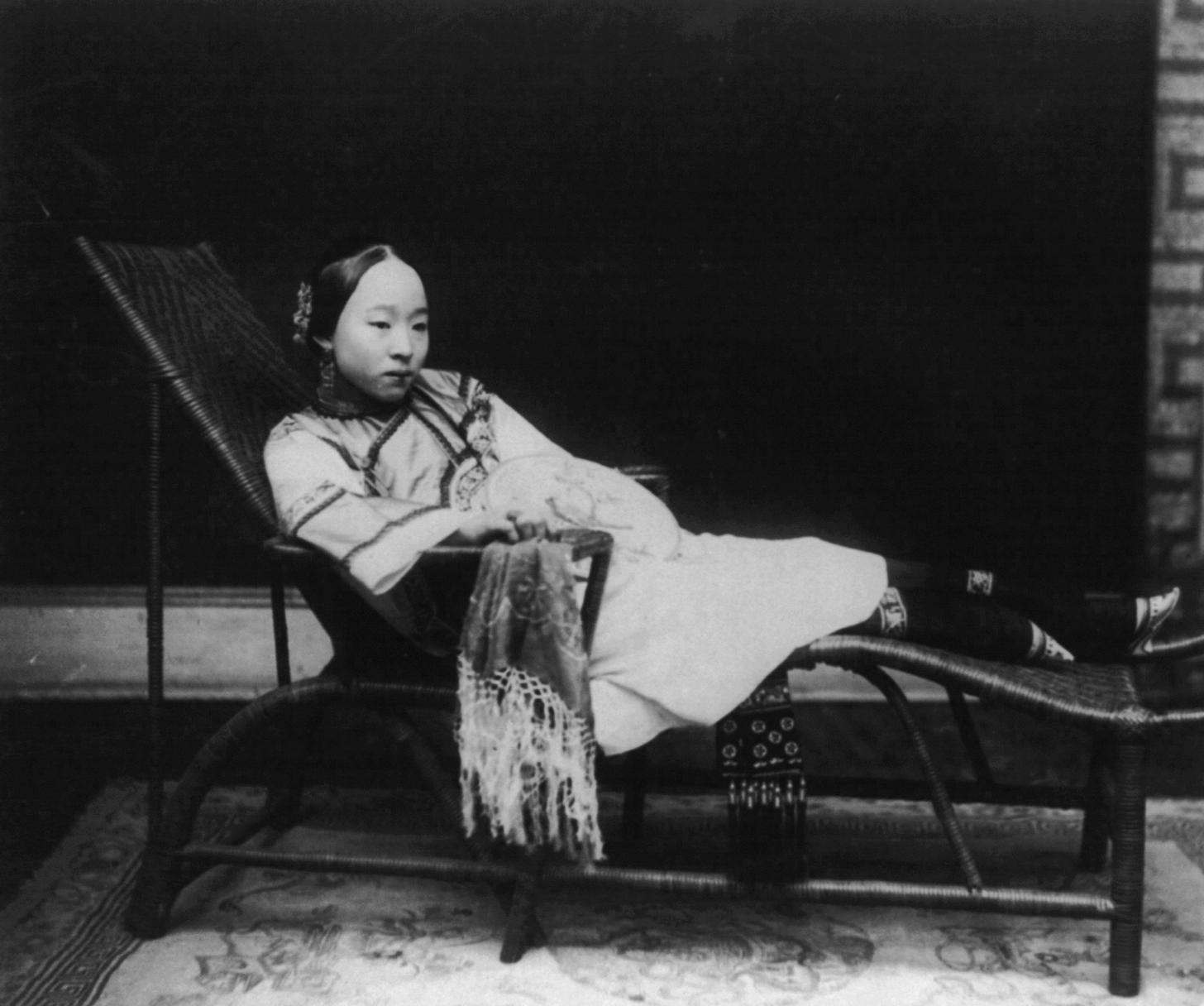
A Chinese woman during the Qing dynasty

== History ==
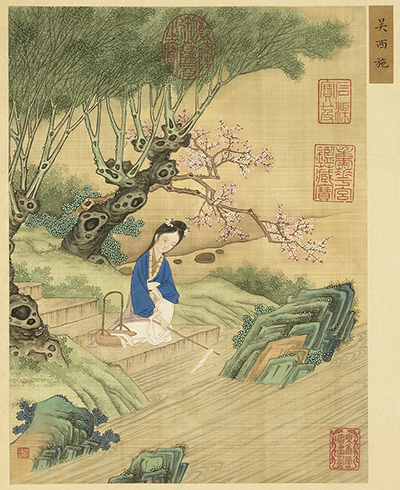
Xishi, one of the Four Beauties

=== Pre-Modern China ===
The emphasis that both Taoist and Confucian notions of female beauty place on the relationship between inner and outer beauty has influenced the creation of the Chinese female beauty ideal. Outer beauty was thought to represent virtuousness, talent, and other positive characteristics.

Concepts like yin-yang, Taoism, and Confucianism have historically enabled gender roles and hierarchy, such as viewing women as submissive and men as powerful. Yin-yang has been somewhat weaponized to reinforce the contradictions between men and women, though it originally was intended to represent their complementary qualities. Taoism has been interpreted to dictate that the purpose of a woman’s attractiveness was for pleasing men.

Confucian ideology in ancient China prevented women from being able to publicly express their beauty, found in practices such as footbinding.

In Taoist thought, women with masculine voices make poor sexual partners, because this trait suggests an excess of qi that inhibits the attainment of sexual harmony. In her article "Female Bodily Aesthetics, Politics, and Feminine Ideals of Beauty," Eva Kit Wah Man articulates how Confucianism and Taoism played essential roles in the creation of Chinese beauty ideals: "In the Chinese tradition, as in other cultures, both the external sexual and inner moral dimensions determine the beauty of a woman…The notion of female beauty comes from both (Taoism and Confucianism)." "Femininity" does not refer to an aspect of a dichotomy between mind and body, as there is no such dichotomy in Chinese philosophy. Women in China also expands on these ideals, delving into the impact women have in Chinese society. Thus, historically, the religious influences on Chinese beauty ideals closely tied outer beauty to inner beauty. Historically, an oval face, willow leaf eyebrows, long thin eyes, small lips, and a slim, fragile-looking body were preferred during the Tang dynasty.

=== Modern China ===
During the 1970s, the Chinese Communist Party began to encourage beauty practices for women in the age of China’s economic reform. Western beauty and fashion also influenced the transformation of these industries and standards in China at this time. This commodification of female appearance and therefore the female body became a way to sustain economic growth. Pre-Mao China’s female beauty standards were strictly for male interest in an almost oppressive manner. In Socialist China, many products and procedures were banned for a more uniform look.

The Chinese would not describe themselves as a completely capitalist country, nor as a purely Marxist country. They fundamentally ignore this type of question about the essence of its political position, and develop their economy, politics, culture and feminism in their own way. They call themselves a socialist market economy with Chinese characteristics. The rise of Chinese feminist development is highly influenced by the claims of the "new" China (since the early 19th century) and its government that it would save the Chinese woman from the "old society" and set women's minds free (Chun, 2008). An article published in the widely circulated journal Dushu uses an earlier nativist satire to argue that women themselves voluntarily desired the beauty of small feet (footbinding) into the first decades of the twentieth century, despite the elite, male-dominated discourse of liberation and equality that assailed the practice, claiming, "during the long historical period when foot binding became common women's way of life, foot binding was just considered the most natural physical behavior for girls. Foot binding was as common as eating and dressing. Foot binding was also a way for women to seek physical beauty."

The advancements of the Internet, social media, and generative AI also influenced Chinese female beauty standards. Online influencers and technological developments have increased the visibility of beauty standards in everyday life. Attractiveness has become a widely valued quality, resulting in societal expectations for both men and women. However, beauty standards for women are often described as more demanding than those for men.

== Beauty ideals in Chinese culture ==
=== Business ===
In Chinese culture, there is a significant emphasis placed on the appearance and physical allure of women, which is apparent in both business and social settings. John Osburg, Director of Anthropology at the University of Rochester in his book, Anxious Wealth, explores the gender relations in Post Mao China, documenting the well-known disparity that exists between men and women. A theme of his work is that the objectification of women as a commonplace in Chinese culture creates the gender inequalities that are still prevalent today.

"The vast majority of entrepreneurs in post-Mao China are men. This is largely due to the fact that business networking requires entering spaces (such as nightclubs and saunas) and participating in activities (drinking, gambling, and sex consumption) that are not viewed as appropriate for "proper" women....these networks constitute a key component of business...the bulk of the relationships of these networks are forged and maintained through ritualized leisure-experiences of shared pleasures catering to the desires and enjoyments of elite men, including karaoke clubs, saunas, nightclubs, high-end restaurants, and teahouses.

As Osburg details, karaoke clubs, saunas, nightclubs, etc. are meant to attract the businessmen, as there are also multiple red light districts around these areas. Prostitution in China further expands on these areas and this culture. In many cases, relationships between employees, co-workers, partners, etc. are forged through these settings. Based on these traditional practices, it can be stated that it is of utmost importance then for the women to be aesthetically pleasing, further highlighting women's attempt to capture beauty, or at least capture the way it is perceived by Chinese Culture.

An attractive physical appearance is associated with a trustworthy or professional personality, and is therefore often rewarded in career settings. Many industries are based entirely on one’s image and beauty, such as streaming, sales, and social media content creation. Other jobs and hiring processes still hold preference towards better-looking individuals, even if the job does not make it a requirement. In a 2026 study, the employment rate for attractive people in China was 3.5% higher than those who were considered average or unattractive. People who were perceived as more beautiful also had higher intellectual abilities. The study also found that one’s attraction level had greater impacts on younger, less qualified people.

The markets for cosmetic products, surgeries, and services are extremely prosperous in China and show no signs of slowing down. As of 2019, 400 million people in China purchased beauty products, making the market worth over 400 billion yuan.

=== Eating disorders ===
Harsh Chinese beauty standards have led to a rise in eating disorders, particularly for young women. The rates of eating disorders for Chinese women have jumped from 0.46% in 1993 to 17% in 2009. Collectivism is prioritized in many aspects of Chinese society, so respect and loyalty to one’s family is important. Female beauty standards in China have been directly tied to one’s social value and identity, especially after increased exposure to the Western world in recent years. The cultural values of food as a bonding experience for families may clash with this emerging pressure to fit into societal expectations. It is considered disrespectful in China to refuse or waste food, signifying ungratefulness or ignorance towards those who have experienced food insecurity.

Many Chinese women experience close family or friends, as well as the media, reinforcing the idea that being thin is a desirable goal. One reason that physical appearance is regarded as important in China is due to the association with success in career and romantic endeavors. A common fear for Chinese women, even from a young age, is being judged or isolated from their peers for not being thin enough. These standards are often reinforced by homogeneous representation in media and in real life, in aspects such as celebrities or clothing. The conflicting set of expectations can create feelings of confusion and frustration in balancing interpersonal and personal needs. For example, it is common practice for an older family member to encourage a child to eat more, but simultaneously point out that they have gained weight. Negative relationships with food often result from these attitudes about weight and body image. Therefore, many young Chinese women struggle with disordered eating to varying degrees.

=== Internet and AI ===
There is a concept called wanghong (literally “net red”), which refers to the hierarchy of mainly female Chinese influencers online who profit off of their own sexualization or beautification, birthing the term wanghonglian or “Internet celebrity face”, a standard facial model that many Chinese women seek to achieve. This includes having double eyelids, a high nose, a pointed chin, etc. Many of these features are only attained through plastic surgery or editing apps, and photoshopping one’s face has become normalized for Chinese netizens. This phenomenon has also faced some criticisms, particularly for the unrealistic and homogeneous standards that all women are expected to fit into, or the avaricious motives behind wanting to be an Internet celebrity.

Generative AI has made it easier to alter one’s appearance online through tools like beauty filters, generative photoshopping technology, and technologies that change skin tone or eye shape. Apps like Meitu have incorporated AI even before the emergence of OpenAI / ChatGPT. The increased use of AI and facial editing has contributed to concerns about the spread of deepfakes, which can affect both celebrities and common people online, sometimes leading to negative consequences such as online harassment or the creation of explicit content without consent. As AI continues to develop alongside social media, female beauty standards have become more homogeneous and difficult to achieve, sometimes diminishing the value of individual uniqueness.

One recent study by the MIT press has prompted various AI image generators to come up with images of young Chinese women, resulting in almost identical features characteristic to the Internet celebrity face model each time. “Internet celebrity face” is influenced by an amalgamation of what AI determines is the “standard” for female Chinese beauty. Some applications even provide resources for plastic surgeons, appointment setups, and facial scanning for assessment. Other types of websites like shopping platform Taobao use AI to create advertisements and fake salespeople to promote their products. Many of the AI-generated spokespeople and influencers in China are women who possess the generic Internet celebrity face.

“Beauty shame” is a recently coined term on Chinese social media sites like Xiaohongshu and Weibo that describes the experience of dressing oneself up nicely, but then being too ashamed to go out or take pictures. In one 2024 study on beauty shame, young female participants expressed a desire to appear beautiful because they internalized societal standards and acknowledged that being attractive as a woman was important and beneficial. However, the same participants felt embarrassed about showing off their external beauty, for reasons such as being uncomfortable about changing their appearance and not wanting to attract attention. Most of them also described feeling uneasy about the male gaze in particular, believing that it is often ill-intentioned. This is aligned with the traditional view that showing one's feminine beauty and therefore attracting male attention are shameful and the fault of the woman.

== Features of Chinese Beauty ==
=== Hair ===
Long black hair is often regarded as attractive for women, particularly when it is strong and healthy.

=== Double eyelid ===
Double eyelids are unconditionally considered beautiful in East Asian society. The double eyelid is a crease in the small flap of skin that covers the eye. It has been estimated that about 17–32% of Chinese women lack this upper eyelid crease, giving them a monolid appearance.

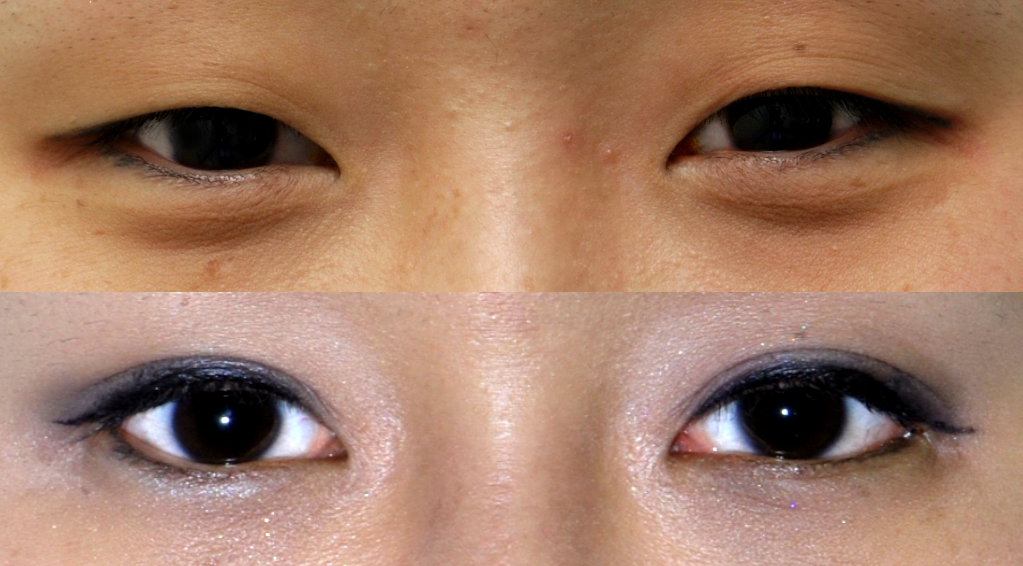
Blepharoplasty before and after

A study looked at which type of eyelid was considered most attractive on Chinese women. Edited photographs of young Chinese women's eyes were presented to the test participants. It found that there was significant preference for the double eyelid while the single eyelid was considered to be the least attractive. Because of this, many Chinese women go through a surgery that creates a fold in the upper eyelid giving them the double eyelid. This procedure, called blepharoplasty, typically costs around $3,000. During this 30 minute surgery, doctors cut, fold, and stitch the upper eyelids, creating a small crease above the eyelids. This operation makes the eye appear larger and more round, giving the woman a more desirable look.

=== Skin ===
In ancient times, skin tone was known to indicate social class. Women of wealthy backgrounds did not have to perform agricultural work, and thus did not acquire a dark complexion. Thus a lighter skin became associated with power, social status, and wealth. Due to this perception, there has been social pressure in Chinese cultures to avoid direct sunlight in the outdoors.

More recently, however, tan skin has emerged as the new female beauty ideal among younger women, who view their tan skin as healthier and more attractive than pale skin. According to Tai Wei Lim, Chinese women in media now sport bronze complexions, and this is viewed as a reclamation of women's autonomy within China.

=== Body ===
In the Spring and Autumn period (722–481 BC), Emperor Chu desired a slim waist; women in his harem often starved themselves to death in order to capture his attention. Historic trends of women developing anorexia nervosa, an eating disorder, to fit trends of beauty represents systemic psychology still influence today's culture surrounding body image. Chinese figures such as Zhao Feiyan were renowned for their small waists and continue to be glorified to this day. Similar to the aforementioned feet binding, waist binding was common practice; men were attracted to women who swayed when they walked due to improper hip growth. In the later Tang dynasty, fuller figures were more popular due to associations with good fortune and wealth. The Chinese idiom huanfei yanshou (環肥燕瘦, literally "plump Huan, slender Yan") is used to refer to the range of types of beauties. Yang Yuhuan, the "plump Huan", is estimated by unofficial records to have been 1.65 meters tall and weighed 69 kilograms.

Modern Chinese people have long considered the ideal woman's body to be relatively tall, slim, and curvaceous. Fascination towards height has continued to increase as evidenced by Chinese beauty pageant winners, but this could correlate more to global pageant standards rather than cultural ideals. Values of fragility in Chinese culture have proven to be relatively prevalent and stable.

In recent times there are new aesthetic trends for shapes of certain body features which are not considered medically healthy, such as square shoulder (直角肩) and butterfly shoulder (蝴蝶肩, visibly protruding scapula).

== See also ==
- Cosmetic surgery in China
- C-beauty
- Nowhere girls, neologism
- Prostitution in China
- Women in China

General:

- Chinese culture
- Feminine beauty ideal
- Social influence
