= Aestura =

South Korean costmetics brand

AESTURA
- Product type: Skincare
- Produced by: Amorepacific Corporation
- Country: South Korea
- Introduced: 1982
- Markets: North America, Australia, Canada, China
- Website: www.aestura.com/

AESTURA (Korean: 에스트라) is a South Korean derma cosmetics brand launched by Amorepacific Corporation. It focuses on developing products with dermatological expertise.

== History ==
AESTURA was launched in 1982 by Pacific Pharmaceuticals. Unlike typical cosmetic brands, it originated from a pharmaceutical company and initially focused on treatments for skin disorders. In 2012, the company entered the cosmeceutical market and changed its name to AESTURA. In 2018, the company sold its filler brand Cleviel to focus on the medical beauty sector. In 2021, Amorepacific Corporation absorbed AESTURA through a merger, integrating it as a business unit within the group.

== Spokespersons and models ==
- 2022: Lee Do-hyun
- 2021: Won Ji-an, Pyo Ye-jin
- 2020: Wooyeon (Wooah)
- 2019: Esom
- 2016: Kim Min-hye
