= Mamonde =

Skincare and cosmetics brand

MAMONDE
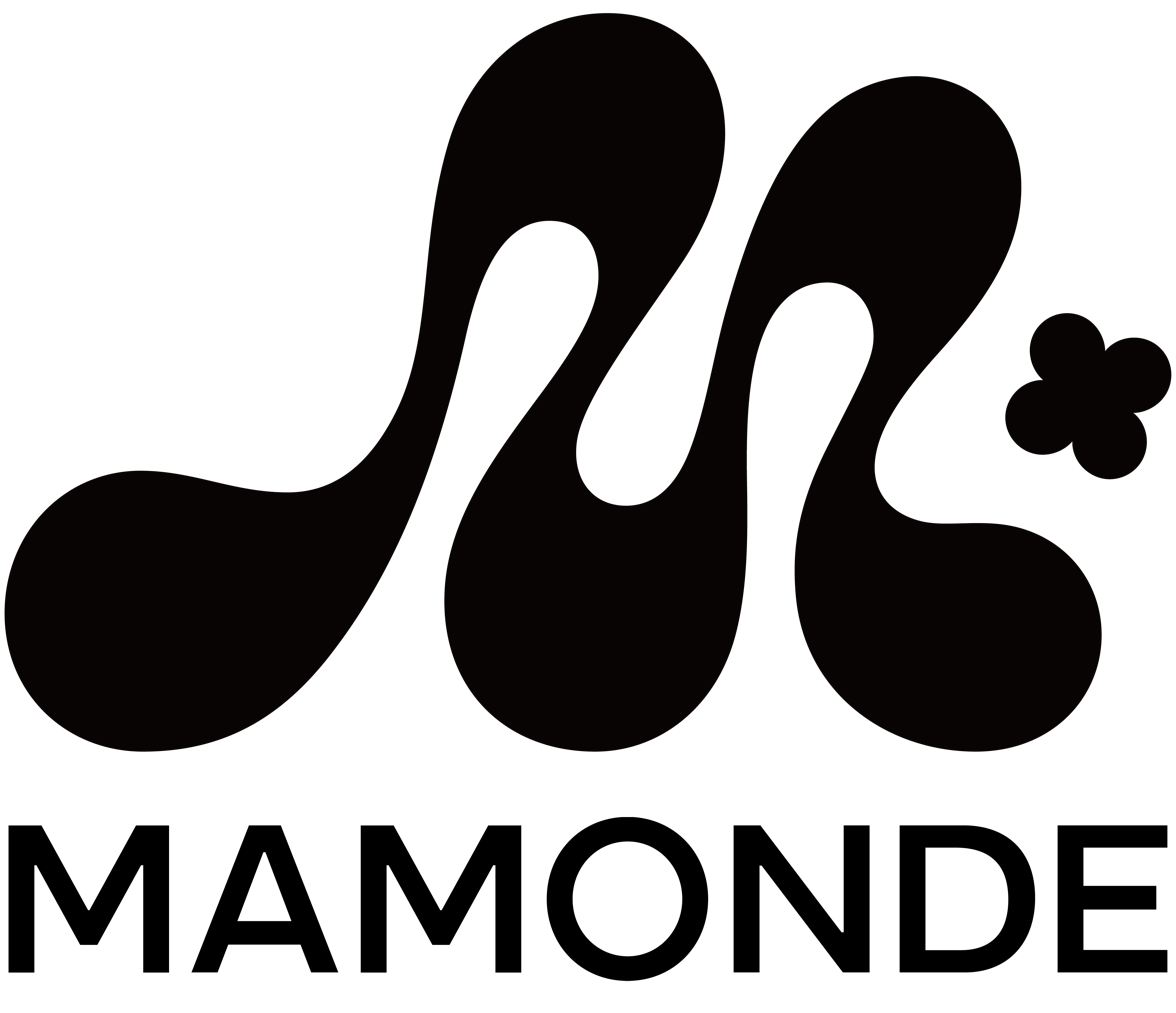
- Founded: 1991
- Headquarters: Seoul, South Korea
- Area served: Worldwide
- Products: Skincare and Make-up Product
- Parent: Amore Pacific
- Website: mamonde.co.kr

Mamonde (Hangul: 마몽드) is a South Korean beauty brand launched by Amorepacific in 1991.

The name is derived from the French words ma ("my") and monde ("world"), meaning "my world." The brand's philosophy centers on supporting confident, independent women in shaping their own world.

For more than 30 years, MAMONDE has researched floral ingredients and their applications in skincare. The brand's proprietary Hyper-Flora^{™} technology combines flower-derived ingredients with skincare research to develop skincare products.

== History ==
- 1990s: MAMONDE was launched in 1991 with the slogan "My Life Is Mine." Actress Lee Young-ae was selected as the brand's first ambassador. Early advertising campaigns featured messages such as "Marriage is not the goal" and "Achievement is not exclusive to men," emphasizing independent and self-directed women, reflecting the changing social attitudes in South Korea during the 1990s.
- 2000s: MAMONDE expanded its research into flower-derived active ingredients and their applications in skincare, establishing the foundation for its botanical ingredient research.
- 2010s: MAMONDE expanded its product portfolio with products in new beauty categories and application formats. In 2013, the brand introduced Creamy Tint Color Balm, which was marketed as a lip product combining the texture of a balm with the color payoff of a lipstick. In 2015, MAMONDE launched Pang Pang Hair Shadow, a cushion-style hairline touch-up product designed to create the appearance of fuller-looking hair.
- 2020s: In 2023, MAMONDE underwent a comprehensive rebranding. The brand selected Winter (singer) of the K-Pop group, Aespa, as its ambassador and introduced a renewed Skin care portfolio built around its proprietary Hyper-Flora^{™} technology. The portfolio was reorganized into product lines targeting the skincare concerns of consumers in their 20s and 30s.

== Key Products ==
- Flora Glow Rose Liquid Mask: A leave-on liquid mask (a liquid skincare formulation applied as a mask treatment without a sheet mask) formulated with Rose Peptide and 10% PHA to provide hydration and exfoliation. A leave-on liquid mask (a liquid skincare formulation applied without a sheet mask) formulated with rose peptide and 10% polyhydroxy acid (PHA). The manufacturer states that clinical testing found improvements in skin exfoliation, skin texture, skin hydration, and makeup application uniformity.
- Pore Control Peony Liquid Mask: A liquid mask for oily skin introduced in 2026. It is formulated with peony extract, zinc, and niacinamide for sebum and pore care. Internal clinical testing found reductions in excess sebum, improvements in the appearance of pores, and improved makeup wear.
- Calming Shot Azulene Serum: A serum formulated with azulene and niacinamide for hydration and the care of post-irritation marks in oily, dehydrated skin. The manufacturer states that clinical testing found improvements in skin hydration, reductions in excess sebum, and improvements in the appearance of hyperpigmentation. The product received first place in the Brightening category at the 2025 second-half Hwahae Beauty Awards.
- Mint Pore Clear Cleansing Balm: A sherbet-textured cleansing balm formulated with mint extract and exfoliating acids (AHA, BHA, and PHA) for removing makeup and impurities. The manufacturer states that clinical testing found effective removal of heavy makeup, sunscreen, and pore impurities, including hardened sebum.

== Spokespersons and models ==
- Lee Young-ae (1991~1999)
- Hwang Soo-jung (2000~2001)
- Park Joo-mi (2002~2004)
- Han Ga-in (2005~2009)
- Han Ji-min (2010~2011)
- Kwon Yu-ri (2012~2013)
- Park Shin-hye (2014~2020)
- Jo Soo-min (2021)
- Yerin Baek (2021)
- Winter (singer) (2023~2025)

== See also ==
- K-beauty
