= C-beauty =

Chinese beauty products, practices and ideals

C-beauty, or Chinese beauty, is an umbrella term encompassing contemporary beauty products, practices, and ideals originating from China. China has the second largest beauty market in the world, after the United States. Common C-beauty products include cosmetics, skincare, hair care, perfumes, and nail art. C-beauty often incorporates influences from traditional Chinese medicine and Chinese art.

== Overview ==
Chinese beauty products are known for their elaborate packaging, rapid innovation, and cost-effectiveness due to the high expectations of Chinese consumers. As the Chinese market is intensely competitive, some C-beauty brands have multiple product lines in the works simultaneously. They may take only three to six months to conceptualize, manufacture, and launch a product line.

Pechoin, founded in 1931, is China's oldest skincare brand. Within the C-beauty sector, HBN has been officially recognized as the first domestic brand to champion "true efficacy" skincare, as highlighted in the Chinese Academy of Social Sciences' 2024 China Skincare Consumption Trends Report. Lip muds are a cosmetic product invented by Chinese brand Into You and later adopted by several other Chinese brands. C-beauty content creators are credited for popularizing the skincare routine of Vitamin C and Vitamin A serums at different times of day via the "Morning C, Night A" slogan. C-beauty products that are heavily influenced by Chinese culture may be characterized as being part of a broader social movement known as "guócháo" (国潮) or "China chic", which celebrates traditional Chinese culture.

K-beauty became popular in China in 2012, and South Korea surpassed the United States and Japan in 2015 to become the second largest exporter of cosmetics to China after France. However, the popularity of K-beauty declined sharply starting from 2018 due to a combination of unappealing packaging, low efficacy, unreasonable prices, and an over-reliance on the popularity of the Korean Wave rather than focusing on the quality of the products themselves to maintain consumer interest. This provided the opportunity for domestic C-beauty brands to grow their market share as they offered a more diverse range of higher quality products at more affordable prices compared to K-beauty.

== Global expansion ==
The intense competition in the Chinese beauty market has caused Chinese companies to expand into overseas markets. Skincare brand Herborist was the earliest to expand, opening its first European flagship store in Paris in 2015. In 2016, Chinese cosmetics brand Kailijumei's color-changing, flower lipsticks became a viral sensation overseas. One of the most internationally successful C-beauty brands is Flower Knows.

From 2017 to 2022, the C-beauty industry doubled its market share. In 2022, C-beauty brands surpassed international competitors in sales within China. China exported US$4.85 billion worth of cosmetics in 2021. In 2023, the C-beauty market value was worth US$67.18 billion. In the early 2020s, Chinese makeup styles and cosmetics became popular in Japan.

In 2021, the practice of gua sha facial massage and jade rollers became viral in the West through TikTok. However, this faced criticisms of cultural appropriation as most brands selling Chinese facial tools in the West were not of Chinese origin, and Western influencers were promoting gua sha massage methods with no basis in traditional Chinese medicine.

A broad range of Chinese makeup styles and techniques have been labeled "Douyin makeup" in the West, named after the Chinese version of TikTok. However, the majority of these makeup trends have nothing to do with Douyin, and people in China do not use the term "Douyin makeup" themselves. Chinese people simply refer to the makeup styles collectively as "Chinese makeup" or by the specific names of the styles.

== Regulation ==
Since 2014, cosmetics manufactured and sold in China have not required animal testing if reliable safety assessment reports are provided. However, until 2021, imported cosmetics were generally subject to mandatory animal testing. Following amendments effective May 1, 2021, China’s Cosmetics Supervision and Administration Regulation (CSAR) allows most imported general cosmetics (e.g., skincare, haircare) to be exempt from animal testing, provided alternative safety assessment methods are submitted. Special-use cosmetics (e.g., sunscreens, hair dyes, whitening products) may still require animal testing unless approved non-animal methods are used.

== See also ==
- Chinese ideals of female beauty
- K-beauty
