= Ganguro =

Japanese fashion trend

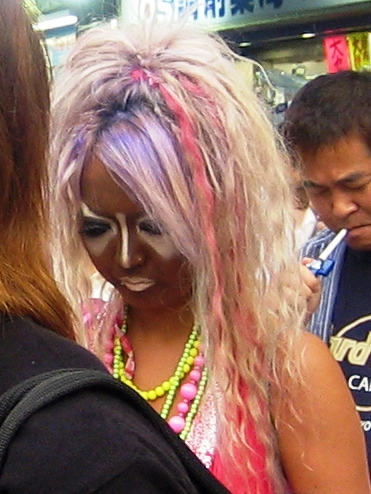
Yamanba, 2006

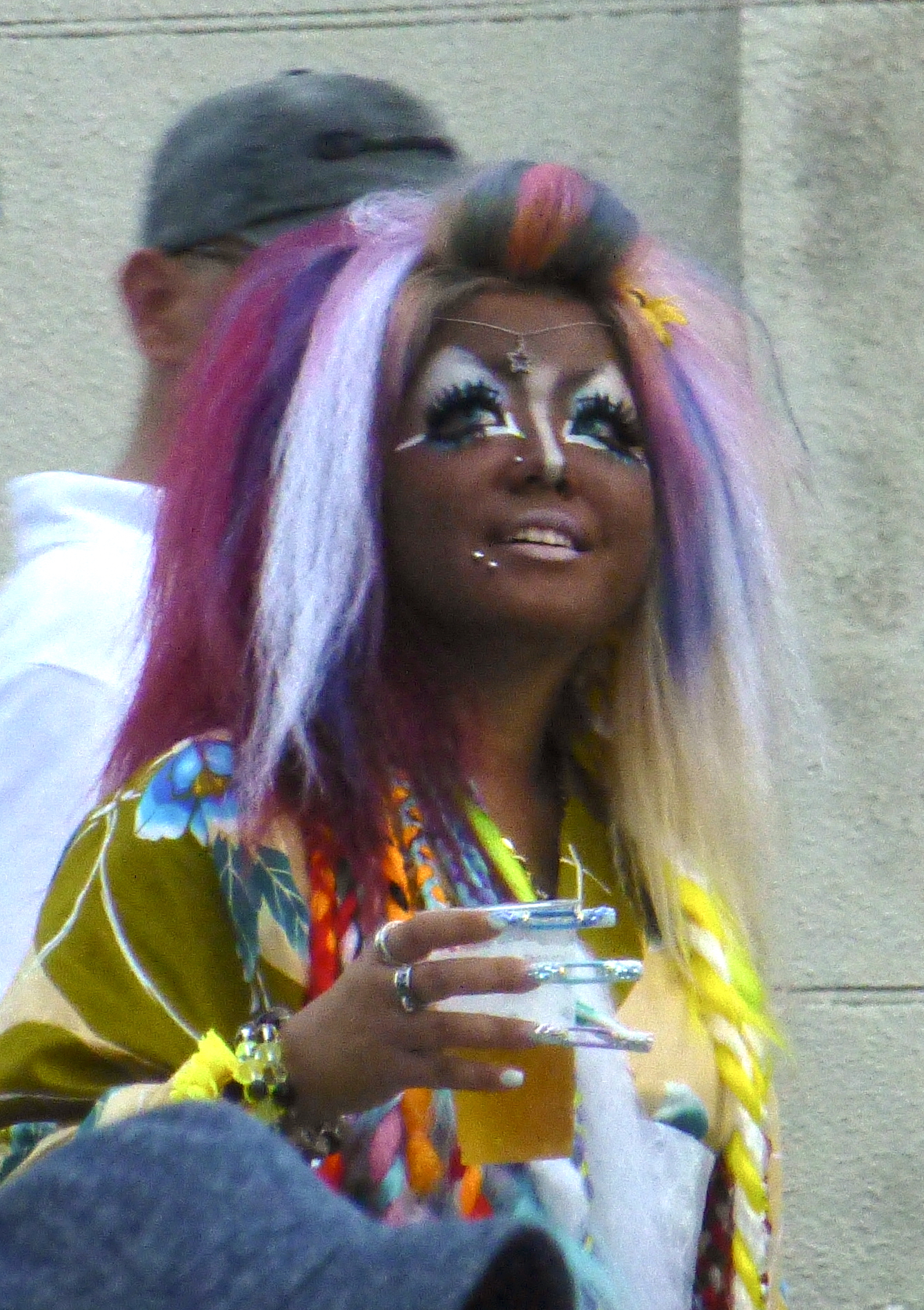
Yamanba, 2016

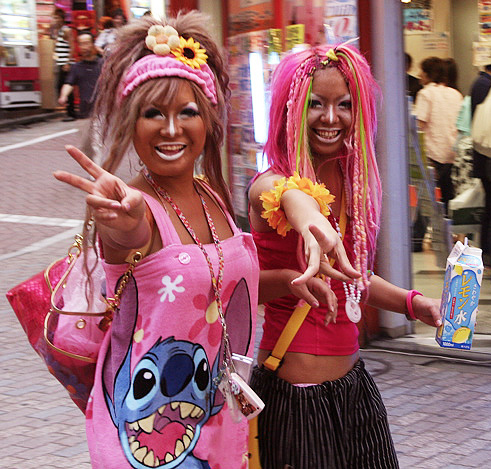
Yamanbas in 2006

Ganguro (ガングロ) is an alternative fashion trend among young Japanese women which peaked in popularity around the year 2000 and evolved from gyaru.

The Shibuya and Ikebukuro districts of Tokyo were the centres of ganguro fashion; it was started by rebellious youth who contradicted the traditional Japanese concept of beauty; pale skin, dark hair and neutral makeup tones. Ganguro instead tanned their skin, bleached their hair and used colourful makeup in unusual ways.

Ganguro has a connection to Japanese folklore of ghosts and demons who are depicted with a similar appearance, such as those in kabuki and noh costumes. This connection is further underlined by the off-shoot style yamanba, named after a mountain witch in Japanese folklore.

The ganguro trend started in the mid-1990s and reached its peak by the latter half of the decade; it purportedly became almost obsolete by 2000 when a bihaku (light skin) craze emerged among young women who wanted to imitate the look of their favourite popular singers, specifically Ayumi Hamasaki, who debuted at the time. The ganguro trend faded out afterwards, although its influence can be observed in yamanba style.

Erimokkori, a self-identified ganguro gal profiled in 2017 at age 24, maintained the style for over a decade, beginning in her early teens despite peers abandoning it. She emphasized commitment to the aesthetic's core elements, including sustained artificial tanning, positioning herself as one of the few remaining adherents in Japan.

== Characteristics ==
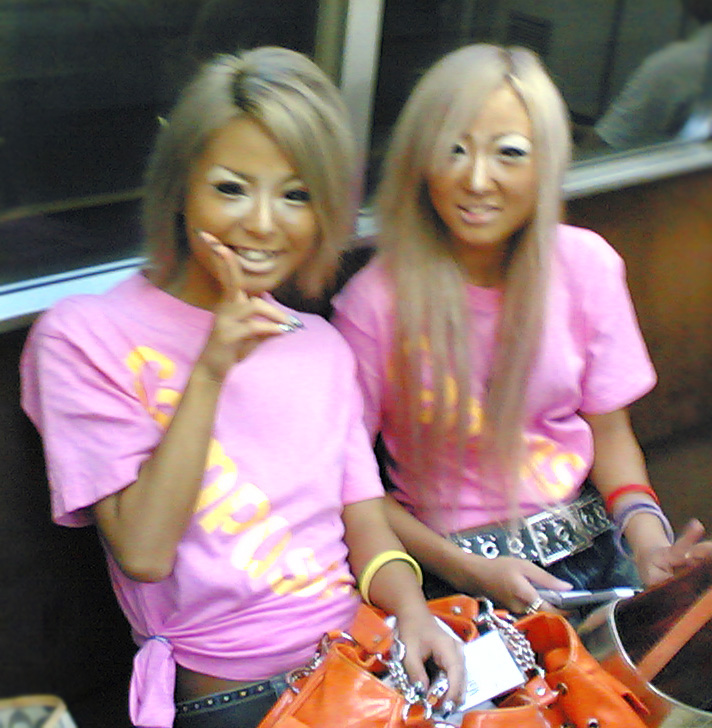
Two Japanese ganguro girls in the subway, August 2006

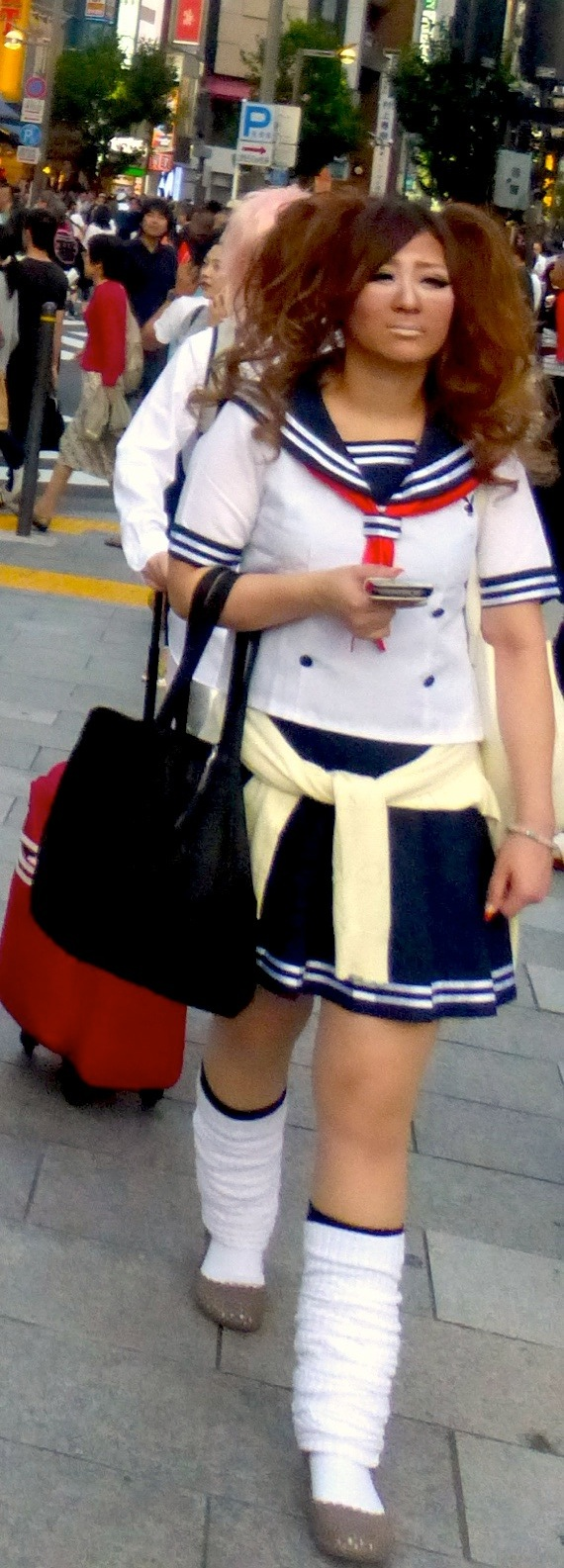
Ganguro style and a school uniform in Shinjuku, September 2015

Ganguro appeared as a new fashion style in Japan in the mid-1990s and was prevalent mostly among young women. In ganguro fashion, a deep tan is combined with hair dyed in shades of red to blonde, or a silver grey known as "high bleached". Black ink is used as eyeliner and white concealer is used as lipstick and eyeshadow. False eyelashes, plastic facial gems, and pearl powder are often added to this. Platform shoes and brightly coloured outfits complete the ganguro look. Also typical of ganguro fashion are tie-dyed sarongs, miniskirts, stickers on the face, and many bracelets, rings, and necklaces.

Ganguro falls into the larger subculture of gyaru (ギャル; from English "gal"), a slang term used for various groups of young women, usually referring to overly childish women. Researchers in the field of Japanese studies believe that ganguro is a form of revenge against traditional Japanese society due to resentment of neglect, isolation, and constraint of Japanese society. This is their attempt at individuality, self-expression, and freedom, in open defiance of school standards and regulations.

Ganguro can be used to describe girls, or gals, with tan, lightened hair and some brand clothing; they can often be confused with Oneegyaru (Big Sister Gal) and Serebu (Celeb), although Oneegyaru is usually associated with expensive gal brands and Serebu focuses on expensive western fashions.

Fashion magazines like Egg and Ageha have had a direct influence on the ganguro. Other popular ganguro magazines include Popteen and Ego System. The ganguro culture is often linked with para para, a Japanese dance style. However, most para para dancers are not ganguro, and most ganguro are not para para dancers, though there are many who are ganguro or gal and dance para para.

One of the most famous early ganguro girls was known as Buriteri, nicknamed after the black soy sauce used to flavor yellowtail fish in teriyaki cooking. Egg made her a star by frequently featuring her in its pages during the height of the ganguro craze. After modeling and advertising for the Shibuya tanning salon "Blacky", social pressure and negative press convinced Buriteri to retire from the ganguro lifestyle.

=== Yamanba ===
Yamanba (ヤマンバ), also sometimes shortened to just manba (マンバ), is a more extreme style that evolved from ganguro. Old school yamanba featured deep tans and white lipstick, pastel eye makeup, tiny metallic or glittery adhesives below the eyes, brightly colored circle lenses, vibrant clothing, and incongruous accessories, such as Hawaiian leis. While yamanba faded in popularity it also started to become more extreme, with multicolored and usually synthetic hair. Manba in 2008 saw a darker tan, and no facial stickers. Hair was usually neon/bright colors, with pink being a favorite. Wool-emulating dreadlocks, extensions, and clips were worn to make the hair appear longer. Clothing remained the same, although leis were worn less frequently.

The male equivalent is called a Sentaa Guy (センターガイ), a pun on the name of a popular pedestrian shopping street near Shibuya Station in Tokyo called Center Gai (センター街, Sentā-gai).

== Etymology ==
Ganguro practitioners say that the term derives from the phrase ganganguro or gangankuro (ガンガン黒; exceptionally dark). The word ganguro can be translated as "burn-black look", and "dark tanning".

The term yamanba is derived from Yama-uba, the name of a mountain hag in Japanese folklore whom the fashion is thought to resemble.

== See also ==
- Gals!
- Gyaru
- Kogal
- Peach Girl
- Sun tanning
