= Pacific Park Villart =

Building complex in Seoul, South Korea

- Interactive map of the Pacific Park Villart area

General information
- Type: Residential, Commercial Complex
- Location: 181, Bangi-dong, Songpa-gu, Seoul, South Korea
- Coordinates: 37°30′48.20″N 127°07′23.20″E
- Construction started: 1994
- Completed: 1996

Height
- Antenna spire: 49.2m
- Roof: 45.9 m (151 ft)
- Top floor: 15

Technical details
- Floor count: 15
- Lifts/elevators: 1

Design and construction
- Architect: Amore Pacific
- Architecture firm: Kunwon Architects Planners Engineers, Hyun-ho HAN
- Awards and prizes: Korea Architecture Culture Award, Completion Division - Premier, 1996 / Seoul Architecture Award - Gold Prize, 1997

- Pacific Park Villart
- Hangul: 태평양 파크 빌라트
- Hanja: 太平洋 파크 빌라트
- RR: Taepyeongyang pakeu billateu
- MR: T'aep'yŏngyang p'ak'ŭ pillat'ŭ

The Pacific Park Villart (Korean: 태평양 파크 빌라트) is a Residential Complex Architectural work in front of Olympic Park, Seoul, located in Bangi-dong, Songpa-gu, Seoul, South Korea. They range from 15 floors, built 1996, used as luxury residential complexes and commercial complexes (Starbucks, CFS Clinic). Unlike other Residential Complex buildings, its shape is formed by two square, against each other, joined with elevator tower located in center.

The builders of the Park Villart installed high-tech security measures. Card keys issued to residents are required at all entrances. Each residence's entrance is accessed by key code.

== Instruction of designer ==
Situated near the Olympic Park in southern, the Pacific Park Villart attempts to maximize views out towards the landscape. Privacy for residential units and an increase in open community spaces are also key design issues. In general, retail spaces occupy the lower base form, while apartment units are above. At ground level, the shape and orientation of the base follows the immediate city grid, In contrast, the multi-storey form above is tilted at a 45-degree angle. This gesture, compounded by varying roof levels, allows for more privacy and diverse views. It also gives the building an individual identity and expression by levitra.

== Awards ==
- 1996, Korea Architecture Culture Award, Completion Division - Premier
- 1997, Seoul Architecture Award - Gold Prize
