= Coreana Cosmetic Museum =

Museum in Seoul, South Korea

Coordinates: 37.524048°N 127.032799°E

The Coreana Cosmetic Museum (Korean: 코리아나 화장박물관; also known as Coreana Museum of Art or Coreana Art & Culture Complex) is a museum in Seoul, South Korea.

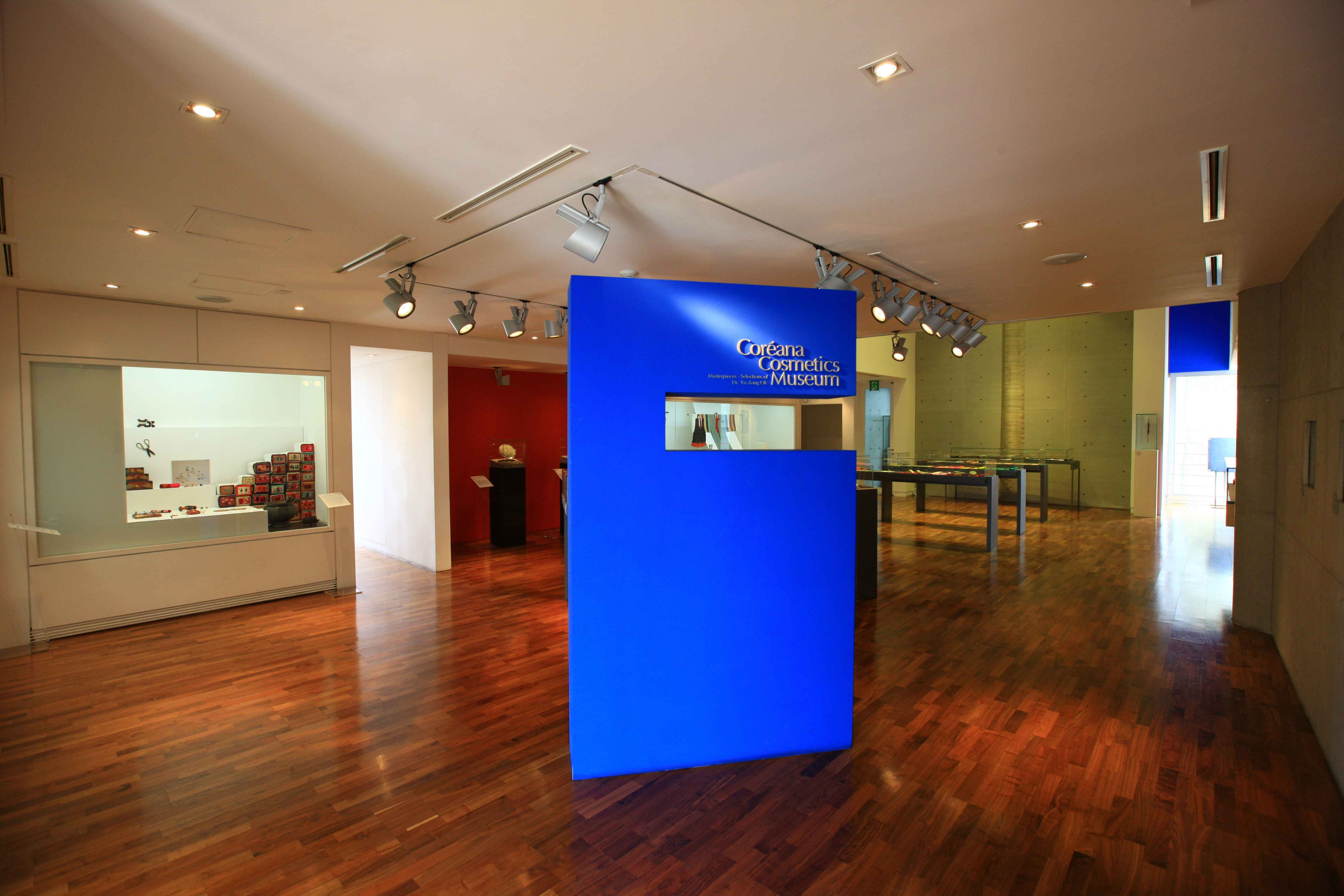
Coreana Cosmetic Museum in 2010

It is related to the Korean Coreana cosmetics company. Its collection is based on 53,000 items collected by Dr. Yu Sang-Ok, one of the executive directors of Coreana.

== See also ==
- Cosmetics in Korea
- List of museums in South Korea
