= Eating disorders in Chinese women =

Causes and treatment of Chinese women's eating disorders

Bulimia nervosa and anorexia nervosa are prevalent in Western countries, such as the United States, but recent studies have shown that they are also on the rise in Asian countries such as China. There are several reasons for this, such as, Chinese culture and westernization. Researchers are looking into these causes, so they can know how to treat and prevent them.

== Background ==
=== Body Dissatisfaction ===
Eating disorders, once thought prevalent only in Western cultures such as that of the United States, are now seen in Chinese women. Body dissatisfaction and eating disorders are almost as common now as they are in Western countries.

== Causes ==
=== Cultural ===
In China, many traditional people hold to a collectivistic cultural tradition (or Confucianism). They learn to conform as an interdependent whole rather than as unique independent beings. This dependency starts in the family, where a parent to child hierarchy is enforced and children are taught to be submissive and obedient. This can cause feelings of rebellion in the child which is why some of them may turn to eating disorders. The child wants to have some control, but they also do not want to disrespect their parents by pursuing autonomy, and so restricting food or binging and purging is, in a way, their way of making decisions.

Several studies confirmed that cultural factors resulting in rebelliousness caused eating disorder symptoms. Ulrike Schmidt, a professor in eating disorders, studied three patients with Chinese heritage who participated in binging and purging behaviours. Her first patient, patient A, grew up in England. As a teenager, patient A's parents expected her to help them with their business since they did not speak fluent English. On top of this she gave them most of her earnings from her job, and she was expected to participate in family life. Dr. Schmidt found that her bulimia symptoms came about because she was seeking independence, and yet she wanted to remain obedient to her parents. This conclusion supports the idea that loyalty versus independence played a conflicting role that lead to eating disorder symptoms.

Moreover, Dr. Schmidt also concluded that patient A's mother nurtured her when she started losing weight. As a result, patient A exploited this in order to make up the deprivations from her childhood. This correlation between conflicting feelings of growing up or remaining young is the other studied cause of why eating disorders arise in young Chinese women. Joyce L. C. did a study in Shenzhen and she reported that some Chinese woman struggle with growing up and so they turn to eating disorders as a control. One such girl relates her feelings when she said,

“I like to be a little girl. In being an adult, you need to care about people's feelings and interact with others. They tend to disappoint me. I met two senior students in college and they seemed to treat me well at first. However, suddenly they had become unfriendly and hostile to me. I felt being betrayed. I hid myself in my dormitory, the only place where I felt safe and secure. I indulged in binge eating and vomiting. I don't wish to be hurt by them again.”

She turns to bulimia as a way of hiding from reality and indulging herself. Because of societal norms in China, it is seen that some women are turning to eating disorders as a way out from their stress and worry.

=== Westernization ===
Eating disorders in China were primarily thought to have come about because of the Westernization of their cities through the media. Western media idolizes thin, beautiful woman. This unrealistic standard entices women to lose weight through dieting, exercising, and if necessary surgery, so as to meet it. Because of the body dissatisfaction that this standard causes it can lead to eating disorders.

Many researchers studied westernization as a cause of eating disorders in Chinese women and it is one of the main theories believed today. Lee and Lee, in a study of different levels of socioeconomic development in three Chinese communities, compared the aptitude of disordered eating among females in high school. He found that females in the higher income cities, even though they were slimmer than the other females in the less modernized cities, desired a lower body mass index (BMI), had greater levels of body dissatisfaction, and overall had more symptoms that relate to risk factors for eating disorders. Thus, from their results, westernization is a probable cause of increased eating disorders. However, some studies suggest other factors account for higher eating disorders in Chinese woman, so even though western media may be one of the causes, it may not be the primary one.

'Little fatty' was once a term of endearment for children in China, but today dieting is popular and thinness is the ideal.

=== Social Change ===
One of the other factors scientist have come up with that may contribute to higher eating disorders in Chinese woman, are sociocultural factors that include gender roles, economic opportunities, religious values, and the cultural objectification of women. When disruptive social change comes about, women are more likely to have disordered eating. Naomi Wolf observed this when she said, “The more legal and material hindrances women have broken through, the more strictly and heavily and cruelly images of female beauty have come to weigh upon us.” As women seek equality, the extreme of ideal body shape arise.

This is seen in many cases throughout history in Western and non—Western cultures. For example, in America, during the 1920s and the 1970s when the role of women were changed the most, “models in US fashion magazines were the most slender and least curvaceous.” In contrast to the Western culture, a study showed that Korean woman, since the economic, social, and political changes in the 1980s to 2000, are more dissatisfied with their bodies (Tsai, 2000). In another study, Jaehee Jung and Gordon B. Forbes, found that among University female students from Korea and the United States, Koreans had greater eating disorder risk factors than the Americans. They concluded this was because of the more recent social changes for woman in Korea. Thus, because both groups of women were equally exposed to Western media, this theory is a contender with the westernization theory as a cause of higher eating disorders.

== Treatment ==
Many people have difficulty seeking treatment in China because receiving help from a therapist is personally looked down on as a mark against one's dignity because if a person needs help, then they cannot help themselves and that is shameful. Thus, reaching out to those who have eating disorders or eating disorder symptoms may be difficult. Moreover, most patients with eating disorders will initially find it difficult to find the motivation to overcome their eating disorder because they are not sure whether they want to change, and yet they know that they need to because it will help them in their lifestyles. When a therapist starts treating a new patient they need to make sure to connect with the patient and create a professional, but helpful client to therapist bond because that connection will help the patient.

=== Family Therapy ===
A common method for helping eating disordered persons is to involve the family. Researchers found that in Western places, like England, family therapy was useful and effective. However, in China, because of the difference in culture, some underage patients refuse help and they will not trust the therapist because they see it as another way of their parents controlling them. In a case study done by Joyce L. C. Ma, she was treating a 17-year-old girl who would not accept her help. The girl said,

“It's my father's session, not my session. My father has a problem and I don't have any. He arranged everything for me. He did too much. I am sick of his over–interference in my life. I knew the sessions were his arrangement too. I dislike being at his disposal any more. So I refuse to meet you.”

In order for the patient to receive help, the therapist needs to create a bond with them first, so that they can voice their needs and the cause of their disorder.

Family therapy in China has also proven beneficial because families can talk about issues in the family. This in turn strengthens the patient and creates a foundation for them to hold onto. Accomplishing this kind of therapeutic bond though is the difficult part for some Chinese people because of the collectivistic culture in which they live in where the children are afraid to speak up against their parents because they do not want to bring shame upon them. Once the therapist can overcome this though, overcoming their eating disorder will be much easier than if it were individual therapy.

== See also ==
- Eating Recovery
- Obesity
- Child and adolescent psychiatry
