= Nowhere girl =

Term for women with few prospects

Nowhere girl or Mei Nü (Chinese: 沒女; pinyin: méi nǚ) is a neologism used to describe women perceived to lack money, employment, education, prospects, looks, friendships, or sophistication. The term carries strong pejorative connotations and is used to characterise women who refuse to conform to male expectations and are therefore perceived as unattractive by men. The pronunciation of "nowhere girls" is homophonic (Note: See Third tone sandhi) with "beautiful girls" (Chinese: 美女; pinyin: měi nǚ) in Mandarin Chinese.

The term may be a calque of a South Korean term, though it spread to Hong Kong via China. It became popularised through a reality show called Nowhere Girls, broadcast by Television Broadcasts Limited, which sparked considerable public debate about the term and its implications.

== Description ==
In the TV program Nowhere Girls, women called "nowhere girls" are depicted as lazy, selfish, short-tempered, rude to others, unfashionable and self-deluded. They supposedly:

- Don't conform to traditional expectations of beauty
- Unemployed or have low income
- Lack social competence
- Escapist
- Self-centered, deny any problems of themselves
- Emotional or short-tempered
- Dependent

== Causes ==
=== Family ===
Low birth rates in Hong Kong have led to a rise in single-child families. The program revolved around exemplifying supposed only-child daughters depicted as pampered, spoiled, and uncommunicative with their working parents.

== Media ==
=== TV programme ===
Nowhere Girls (Chinese: 沒女大翻身) was a reality show produced by Television Broadcasts Limited. It was broadcast in August 2014 and there are 20 episodes in total. The show focuses on seven women who are described as "have nots" and each of them is said to represent one of "seven deadly sins", including laziness, selfishness, ugliness and being a recent mainland immigrant etc. This program received great controversy stemming from wide perception of sexism and prejudice against the so-called "Mei Nü" and its core messaging that "makeovers, working with fitness trainers and life coaches can lead to better lives".

The show was suspected of hiring paid actors to depict the seven "nowhere girls" and staging the footage that was aired. The behavior of a guest counsellor Wong Hoi-man, a clinical psychologist, raised concerns of medical malpractice and may have impacted the professional image of psychologists and qualified therapeutic techniques in Hong Kong.

== See also ==
- Chinese ideals of female beauty
- Femcel
- Tang ping
