= Amorepacific Corporation =

South Korean beauty and cosmetics conglomerate

- AmorePacific HQ, Seoul
- Native name: 주식회사 아모레퍼시픽
- Traded as: KRX: 090430
- Industry: Cosmetics; Perfume
- Founded: 5 September 1945; 81 years ago as Pacific Chemical Co. Ltd.
- Founder: Suh Sung-whan
- Headquarters: Yongsan-gu, Seoul, South Korea
- Key people: Suh Kyung-bae (Chairperson), Seunghwan Kim (CEO)
- Revenue: ▲KRW 4.25 trillion (2025)
- Operating income: ▲KRW 335.8 billion (2025)
- Net income: ▲KRW 247.3 billion (2025)
- Total assets: ▲KRW 6.96 trillion (2025)
- Total equity: ▲KRW 5.50 trillion (2025)
- Parent: Amorepacific Holdings
- Website: www.apgroup.com

Amorepacific Corporation (Korean: 주식회사 아모레퍼시픽) is a South Korean beauty and cosmetics chaebol, operating more than 30 beauty, personal care, and health brands including Sulwhasoo, Laneige, Etude, Aestura, Cosrx, AP Beauty, and Innisfree. The firm was founded in 1945 by Sungwhan Suh and currently managed by Kyungbae Suh, the son of the founder. It is the largest cosmetics company in South Korea and one of the ten largest cosmetics companies in the world.

== History ==
The company originated back in the 1930s, when Madame Dokjeong Yun began selling camellia oil in the village of Kaesong. Her second son, Sungwhan Suh, took over the business in 1945 and transformed the firm into a cosmetics chaebol, naming it "Taepyeongyang (meaning Pacific Ocean in Korean)".

Sungwhan Suh handed the company over to his second son Kyungbae Suh in 1997. Suh rebranded the firm into multi brands company to target the global market and turned the company into a chaebol giant that manages dozens of cosmetics brands.

In 2000, the company established the Korea Breast Cancer Foundation. In 2002, the company was renamed Amorepacific. Four years later, the holding company Amorepacific Group was founded. In 2010, the company built a second R&D center. Forbes named Amorepacific one of the most innovative companies in the world.

In 2018, Amorepacific opened its Global Headquarters in Yongsan, on the same site where the foundation of the business was built in 1965.

In 2025, the holding company Amorepacific Group was renamed Amorepacific Holdings. In time for the company's 80th anniversary the same year, the company declared its mid-to-long-term vision for 2035 and strategies to become a global leader in beauty and wellness under the vision slogan "Create New Beauty."

== Brands ==
- Aestura
- Amos Professional
- AP Beauty
- Ayunche
- B.Ready
- COSRX
- Espoir
- Etude House
- Gentist
- Hanyul
- Happy Bath
- HERA
- Holitual
- ILLIYOON
- Innisfree
- IOPE
- Laneige
- Labo H
- Longtake
- makeOn
- Mamonde
- Median
- Mise-en-Scène
- Odyssey
- Osulloc
- Primera
- Ryo
- Skin U
- Sulwhasoo
- Tata Harper
- Vital Beautie

In 2024, the World Intellectual Property Organization (WIPO)'s Madrid Yearly Review ranked Amorepacific Corporation's number of marks applications filled under the Madrid System as 7th in the world, with 96 trademarks applications submitted during 2024.

== See also ==
- Pacific Park Villart
- K-beauty
