= K-beauty =

Umbrella term for skin-care products that derive from South Korea

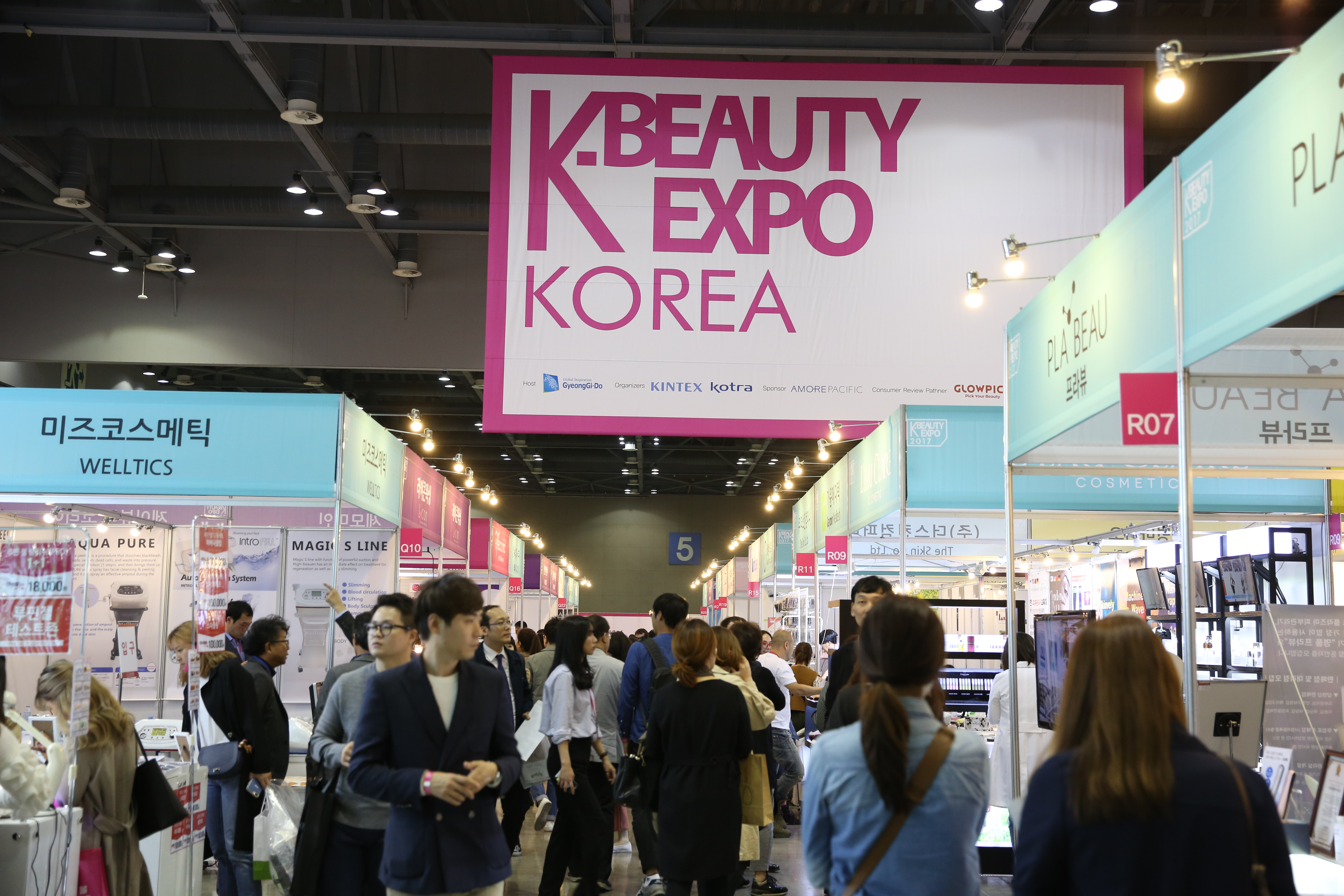
K-Beauty Expo Korea

K-beauty (Korean: 케이뷰티) is an umbrella term for skincare products that are derived from South Korea. K-beauty gained popularity worldwide, especially in East Asia, Southeast Asia, South Asia, and the Western world, and focuses on health, hydration, and an emphasis on brightening effects.

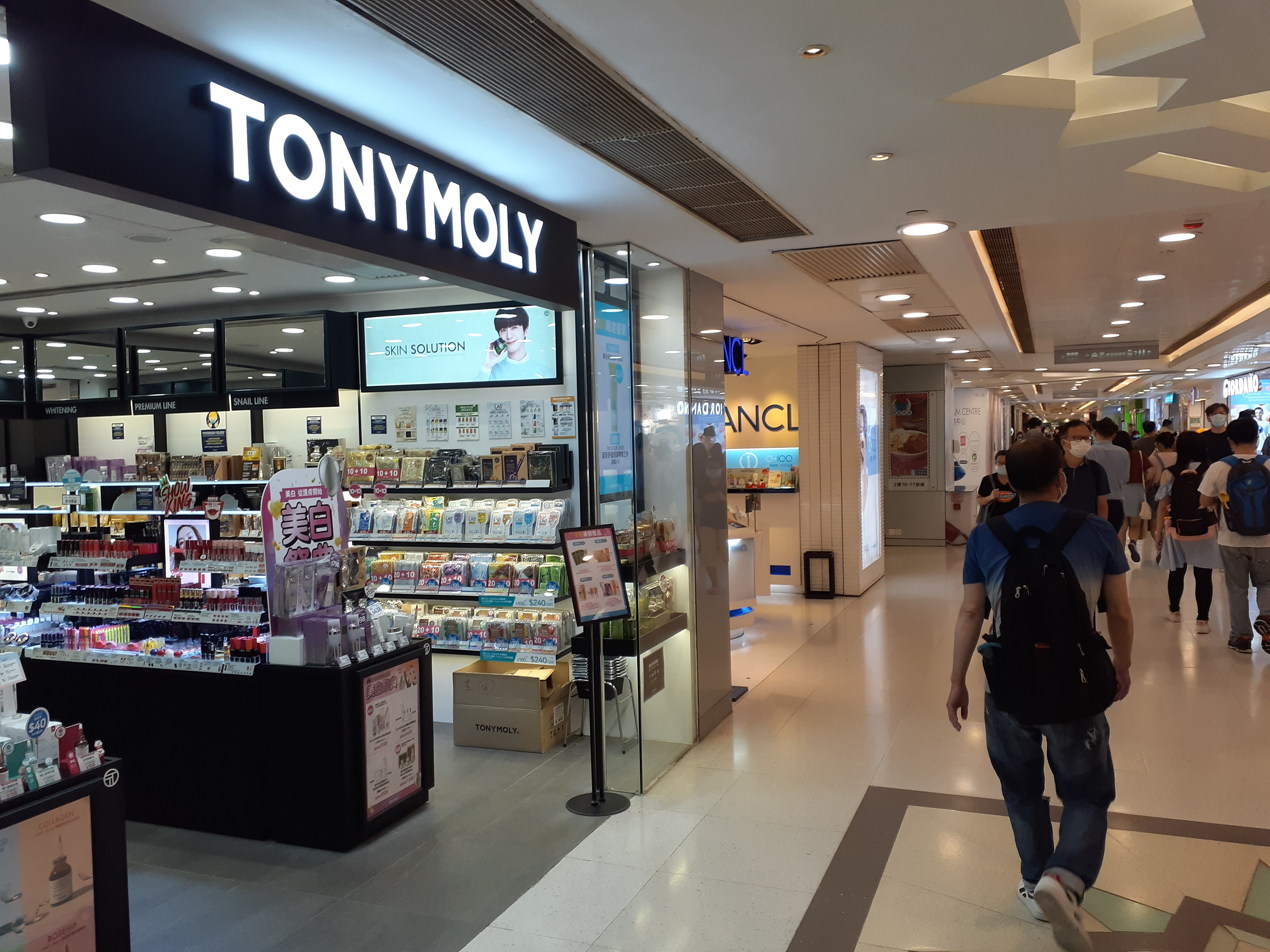
K-Beauty brand, Tonymoly

Although the focus for these beauty products is on skin aesthetics such as health, hydration, and luminous textured skin, glowing "glass skin" is favored by South Koreans. Rather than having layers of foundation, it is preferred to have a lengthy skincare regimen with a focus on toning and clarifying. Various natural ingredients are utilized in creating these products in addition to the numerous steps involved in a skincare routine. The skincare and cosmetics industry continues to lead the way in terms of economic gain, as displayed by the growth and expansion of Korean skincare domestically and internationally. The history of Korean skincare has influenced the standards for the ideal beauty and skincare routine which have become engrained into Korean norms over time. The result of which has led to several controversies and movements against harmful and rigid beauty standards set upon the Korean people.

The Asia-Pacific holds the largest market share in the K-Beauty industry as of December 2020, with Asian countries/regions being some of the largest consumers of K-Beauty products. There is also a growing market for K-beauty products in Western countries such as the United Kingdom.

In recent years, Korean skincare and cosmetic products have become a worldwide phenomenon, revolutionizing the global beauty industry with innovative products and aesthetic trends. Korean beauty first emerged in the West in 2011 with the launch of the BB cream, marketed as a multi-tasking skincare product that serves as a foundation, moisturizer and sunscreen. Korean skin care products are available and can be found in department stores, pharmacies, and special beauty retailers. Korean skincare products are widely available internationally through various retail channels.

Beauty product consumers are paying more attention to the ingredients of the skin care products before investing and purchasing the items. Products that say natural and organic have more appeal to consumers. Recently, natural ingredients beauty products have clinical research studies began evaluating their therapeutic potential and biological cutaneous effects.

== Ingredients and routine ==
Korean beauty standards in the 21st century prize a youthful look and the appearance of moisture on the skin are prized, which results in a preference for cremes over powders. K-beauty products are also more often designed for export, as a result of South Korea's history of import substitution industrialization. K-Beauty products are presented using sophisticated ingredients and appealing packaging. Products use ingredients ranging from more natural sources such as green tea leaves, orchid, soybean to snail slime, morphing masks, bee venom (an anti-inflammatory "faux-tox" alleged to relax facial muscles), moisturizing starfish extract, and pig collagen. The regimen involves a series of steps including cleansing rituals (with oil and water based products), sheet masks, essences, serums, moisturizers, cushion compacts, fermented products, and SPF 35 sunscreen. At night, the sunscreen is replaced by a "night cream". Each regimen is addressed differently depending on complexion factors including hormonal fluctuations and lifestyle choices.

The ultra-elaborated K-Beauty skincare regimen consisted of an average of 10 steps. It normally starts with a dual cleaning ritual, series of sheet masks, essences lotions, serums, and rich moisturizers, and then ends with an SPF sunscreen, except at night when the sunscreen is swapped for a thick sleep cream. The facial skincare products are successful, due to the abundant development of new skin products and that two-thirds (68%) of all launches of skincare products were products from South Korea. Although men are increasingly participating in the market, the focus is still on women. YouTubers offer tutorials on how to apply cosmetics and skincare products.

== Medical aesthetics (cosmetic procedures and dermatology) ==
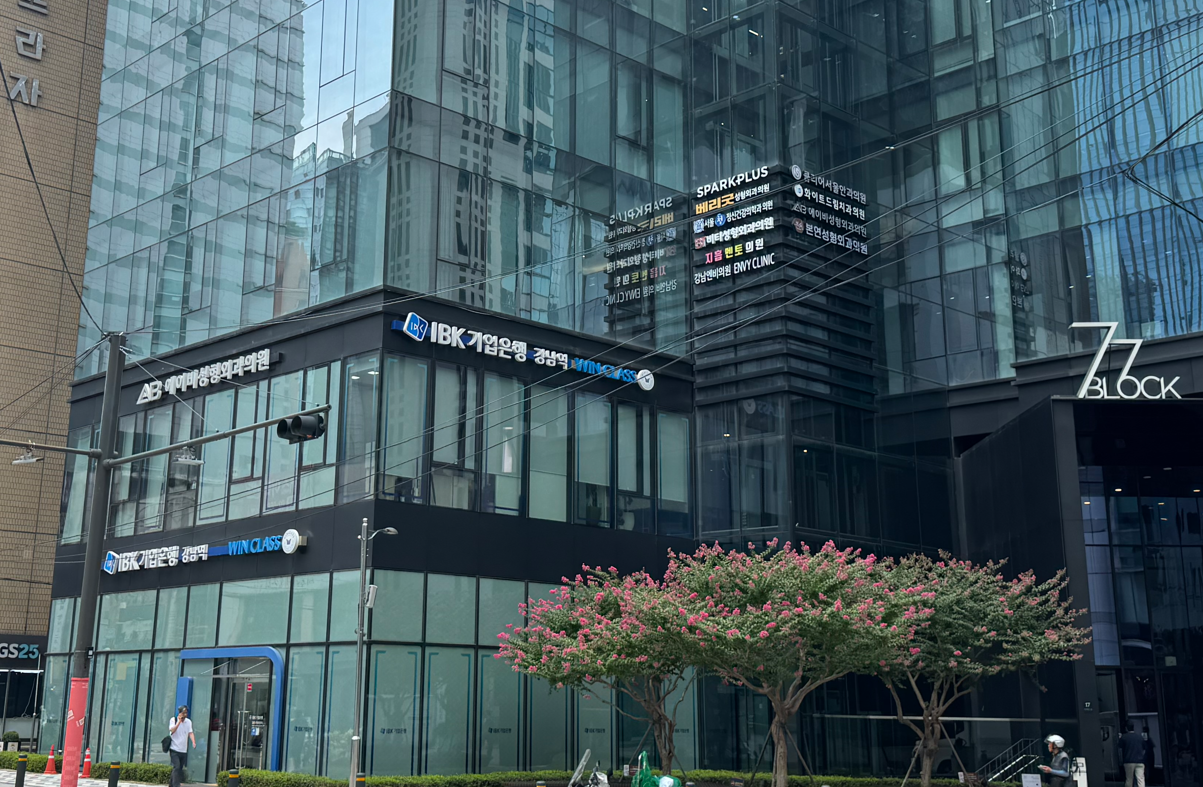
Cosmetic surgery clinics near Gangnam Station, Seoul

In addition to skincare and makeup, K-beauty is closely connected to South Korea's cosmetic surgery and dermatology sectors. Seoul's Gangnam district is widely noted as a major hub for aesthetic procedures, with a high density of clinics offering double-eyelid surgery, rhinoplasty, facial contouring, and skin-rejuvenation treatments. International statistics also show South Korea among the leading countries for aesthetic procedures, including eyelid surgery and rhinoplasty, on a per-capita basis.

Dermatology clinics play a notable role in the K-beauty landscape by offering in-office treatments that complement consumer skincare—e.g., laser resurfacing, acne-scar therapy, and injectable skin boosters (such as polynucleotide products) that are often used adjunctively after energy-based treatments. Surveys in Korea further indicate high public exposure to laser skin treatments, with higher adverse-event risks reported outside dermatology settings—contextualising the large role of dermatology clinics within K-beauty's prevention-focused approach.

K-beauty's medical aesthetics dimension also intersects with inbound medical tourism, with international media and reports describing steady growth in visitors seeking cosmetic procedures in South Korea.

== Industry ==
South Korea is the leader of the global beauty industry, it continues to advance; analysts expect K-Beauty to generate immense growth and expansion of Korean skincare brands to bring in high revenue. This continues to be the projection for the upcoming years.

South Korea is also known for being the center for many skin care brand's research and development as well as a manufacturing and production hub. The majority of Koreans are found to be well-educated and informed about skin care and health, so many of the products developed by Korea are thoroughly regulated. An additional factor for its success includes the influence of popular culture, such as the Hallyu Wave, where celebrities promote makeup brands and help to promote them domestically and internationally.

K-Beauty is associated with the Korean Wave; for example, the South Korean cosmetics company Amorepacific sponsored My Love from the Star, a 2014 K-drama whose constant marketing of Amorepacific products resulted in an increase in skincare and lipstick sales of up to 75 and 400 percent. The combination of increased international tourism in South Korea combined with K-Beauty products' presence in duty-free shops has also worked to increase sales of cosmetics in Korea.

== History ==
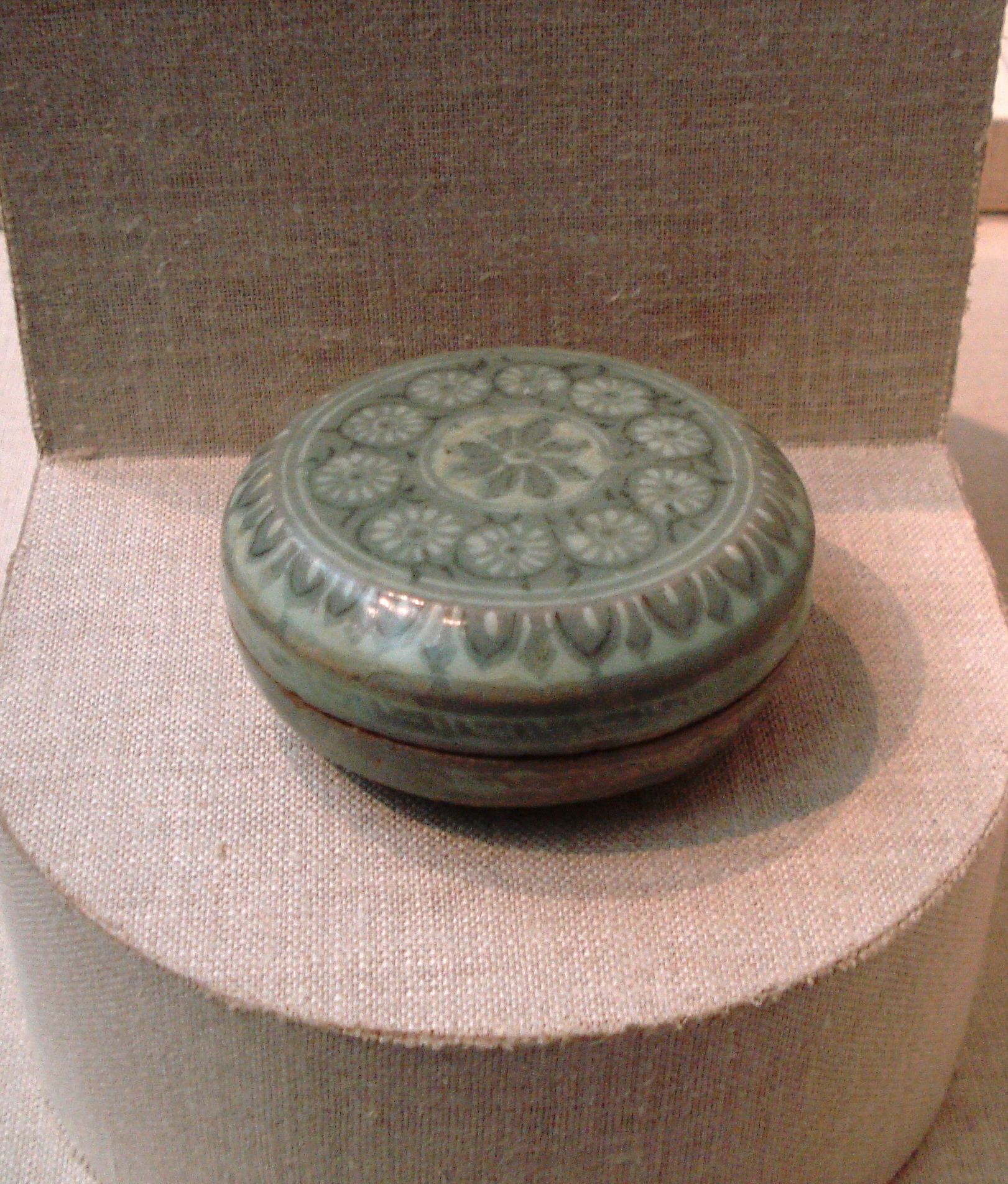
Goryeo dynasty cosmetic box

In the past, Koreans were known to create and utilize several skincare and makeup products. Additionally, the superficial appearance was thought to be linked to one's inner health and care. Many were made from natural ingredients around them, such as oils, plants, or natural powders. These natural cosmetics at the time added fragrance to the product which was often thought to reduce stress and fatigue, as stated in the Gyuhap Chongseo or Women's Encyclopedia. The origins of Korean beauty developed during the time of the Three Kingdoms where beauty culture became more prevalent. A special emphasis was placed upon the Goryeo era as it was known to be the pinnacle for Korean beauty standards.

The Goguryeo era was thought to be excessive by Joseon standards. During the Joseon dynasty, Confucianism dictated what was acceptable in terms of beauty with a focus on the inner self. In the Joseon dynasty, the idea of beauty stems from fair-looking skin and cherry lips to accentuates the elegancy of their status. Korean beauty often flowed from the lower-class to the elites as many elites mirrored the female entertainers, known as gisaeng. Beauty accessories and containers were then invented and sold. Trade and imports from other countries, like Russia and China, then became more frequent.

== Beauty standards and controversies ==
This is evidence of South Koreans' strong interest in physical wellbeing and attractiveness, which are considered to be linked both to body wellness. South Korea has become a destination for cosmetic tourism thanks to the popularity of K-beauty and the high quality of the country's doctors and healthcare system. The standards in South Korea have created the "Escape the Corset" movement to cast off what a minority believe are the country's rigid beauty standards. This movement was created by a small group of women that wanted to put a stop to existing beauty standards, as well as their long-accepted attitude towards plastic surgery and cosmetic. This movement was inspired by the #MeToo Movement. The Korean wave has led to new beauty standards among young people in South Korea. Facial beauty products are particularly popular in South Korea.

In common with most of the rest of the world, the value that South Koreans have placed on physical attractiveness can influence some young person's self-esteem and interpersonal and romantic relationships, for those who believe that they are not up to these standards. Social aesthetic preferences for women wearing makeup and having a small 'heart-shaped' face is strong. In South Korea, in the past, pressure for conformity against people who left the mainstream path used to be relatively intense as compared to fellow advanced, democratized countries. In 2014, it was recorded that 980,000 cosmetic surgery procedures were done in that year, albeit only around 50 percent of them involving South Korean nationals. Thanks to the popularity of k-beauty and the quality of South Korean doctors and its healthcare system, many foreigners fly to South Korea for surgery, especially from China, Japan, the United States and Southeast Asia.

Because of the hallyu Korean wave, the nation has seen Korean celebrities as models of physical attractiveness. Also, South Korea's growing cosmetic surgery industry has highlighted the attention its citizens and foreigners alike put on achieving defined standards of beauty. In the last decade, exposing a nude torso has become requisite for male talents. The fast emergence of a good physical physique derives from new strategies among Korea's media industries in shaping consumer desires by foregrounding male sexuality. For the women, not only is their body important but also their faces and skins. In this respect, South Korea is similar to the United States, Europe, Japan, China and Southeast Asia.

== Clean beauty ==
Natural skincare is often associated with clean beauty, which refers to cosmetic products that favor natural ingredients yet often incorporate synthetics that have been deemed safe for people and the planet. Although they go hand in hand, to be specific, natural can be clean, but clean is not always natural.

Clean beauty has been described as incorporating practices such as cruelty-free testing, vegan formulations, and sustainable packaging. It is often associated with wellness-oriented consumer trends.

In the 2020s, "clean beauty" had no single legal definition; U.S. retailers introduced their own standards (for example, Clean at Sephora), while regulation expanded with the 2022 Modernization of Cosmetics Regulation Act, which added product listing, adverse-event reporting, and forthcoming rules on GMP and fragrance-allergen labeling; the EU separately applies harmonised criteria to cosmetic claims (Regulation 655/2013).

== See also ==
- Korean Wave
- Amorepacific
- Cosmetics in Korea
