= Eonju station =

Railway station in Gangnam District, South Korea

Coordinates: 37.5072°N 127.0339°E

언주 (루시드치과); Eonju (Lucid Dental Clinic)
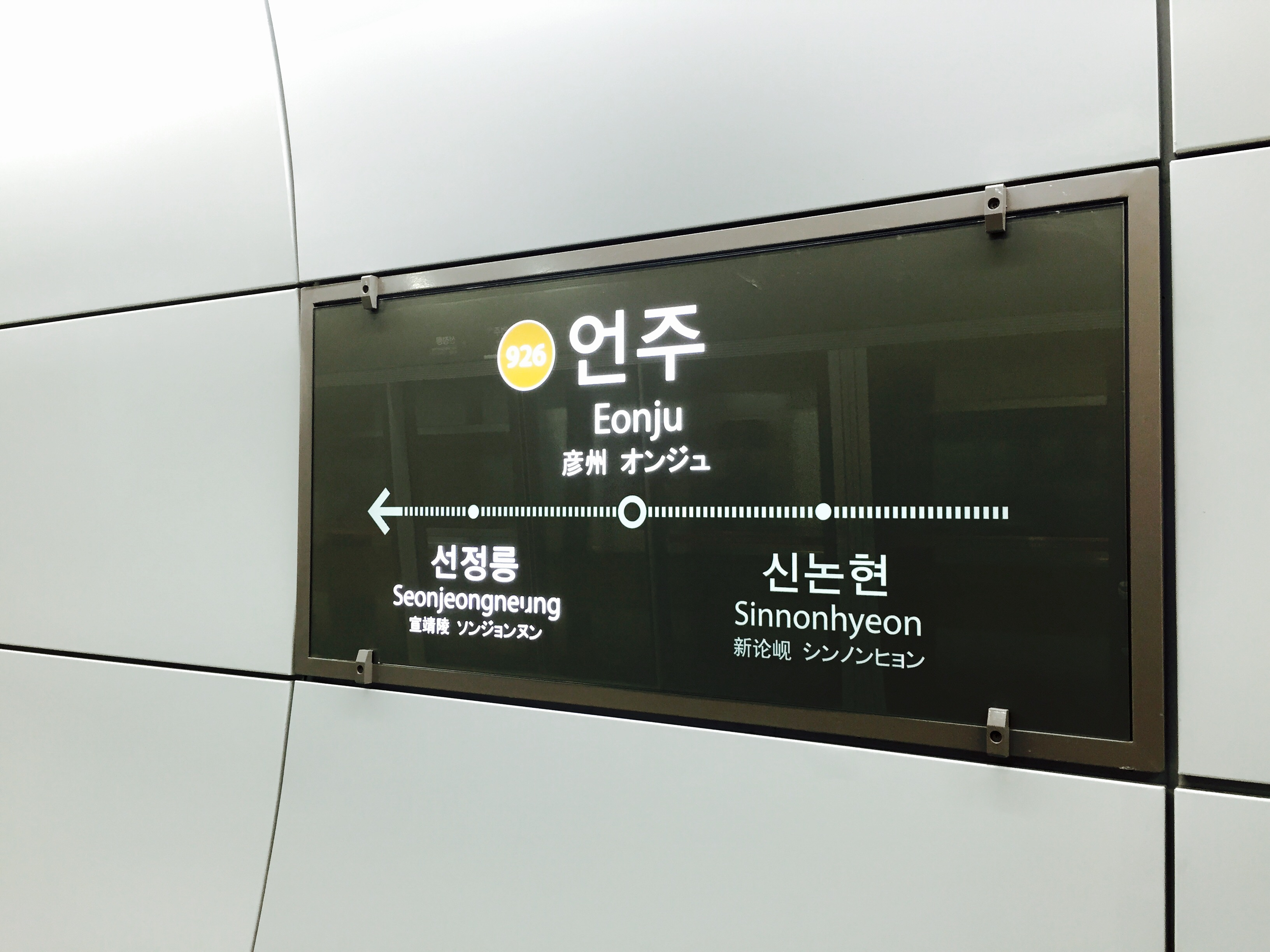

Korean name
- Hangul: 언주역
- Hanja: 彦州驛
- Revised Romanization: Eonjuyeok
- McCune–Reischauer: Ŏnjuyŏk

General information
- Location: 279-165 Nonhyeon-dong, Gangnam-gu, Seoul
- Operator: Seoul Metro
- Line: Line 9
- Platforms: 2 side platforms
- Tracks: 2

Construction
- Structure type: Underground

Key dates
- March 28, 2015: Line 9 opened
Location

Eonju is station on Line 9 of the Seoul Metropolitan Subway. It opened in March 2015.

== Station layout ==
Sinnonhyeon ↑
S/B | | N/B
↓ Seonjeongneung

Northbound Local	← ● Line 9 toward Gaehwa
Southbound Local	● Line 9 toward VHS Medical Center →

== Gallery ==
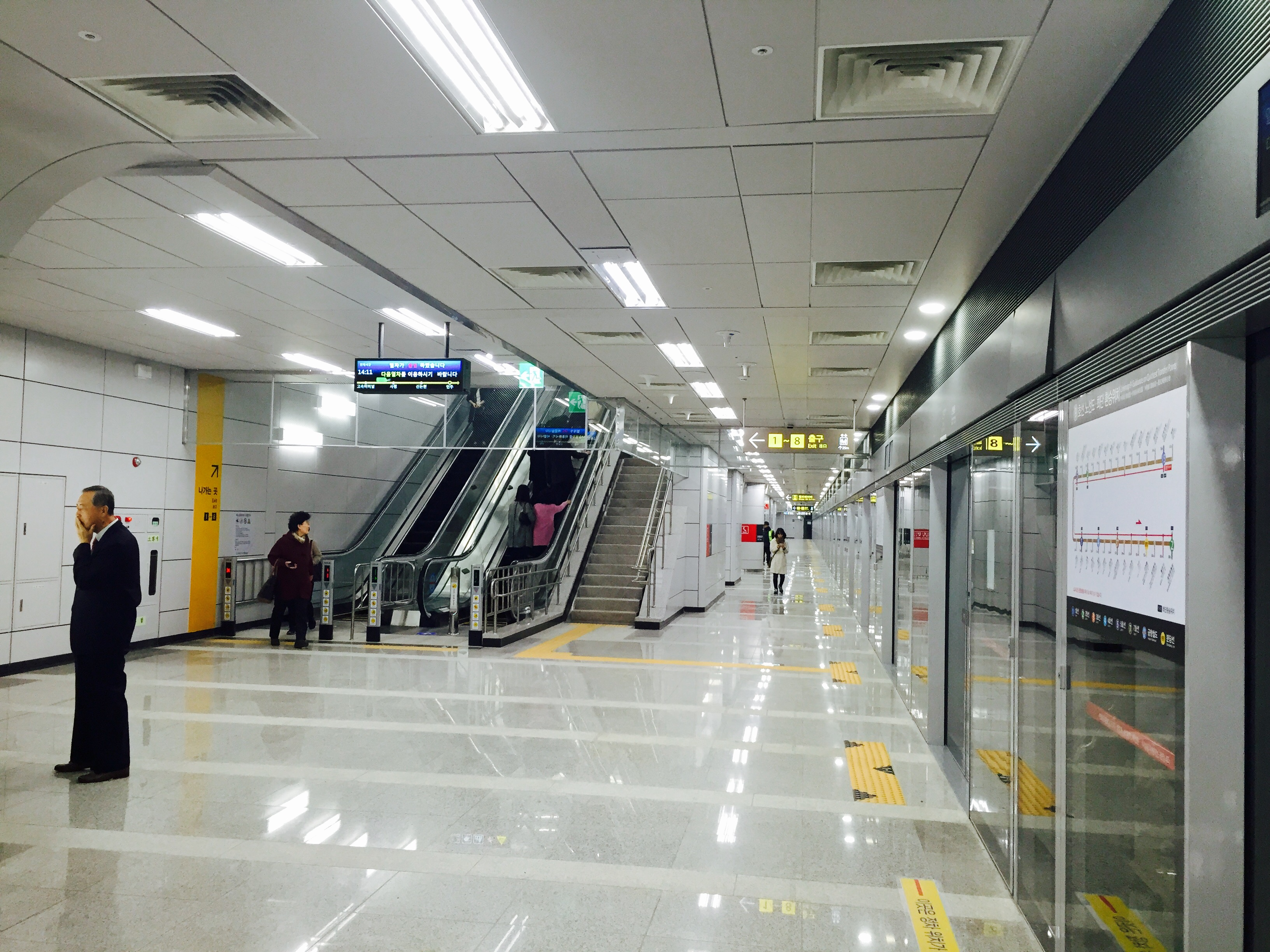

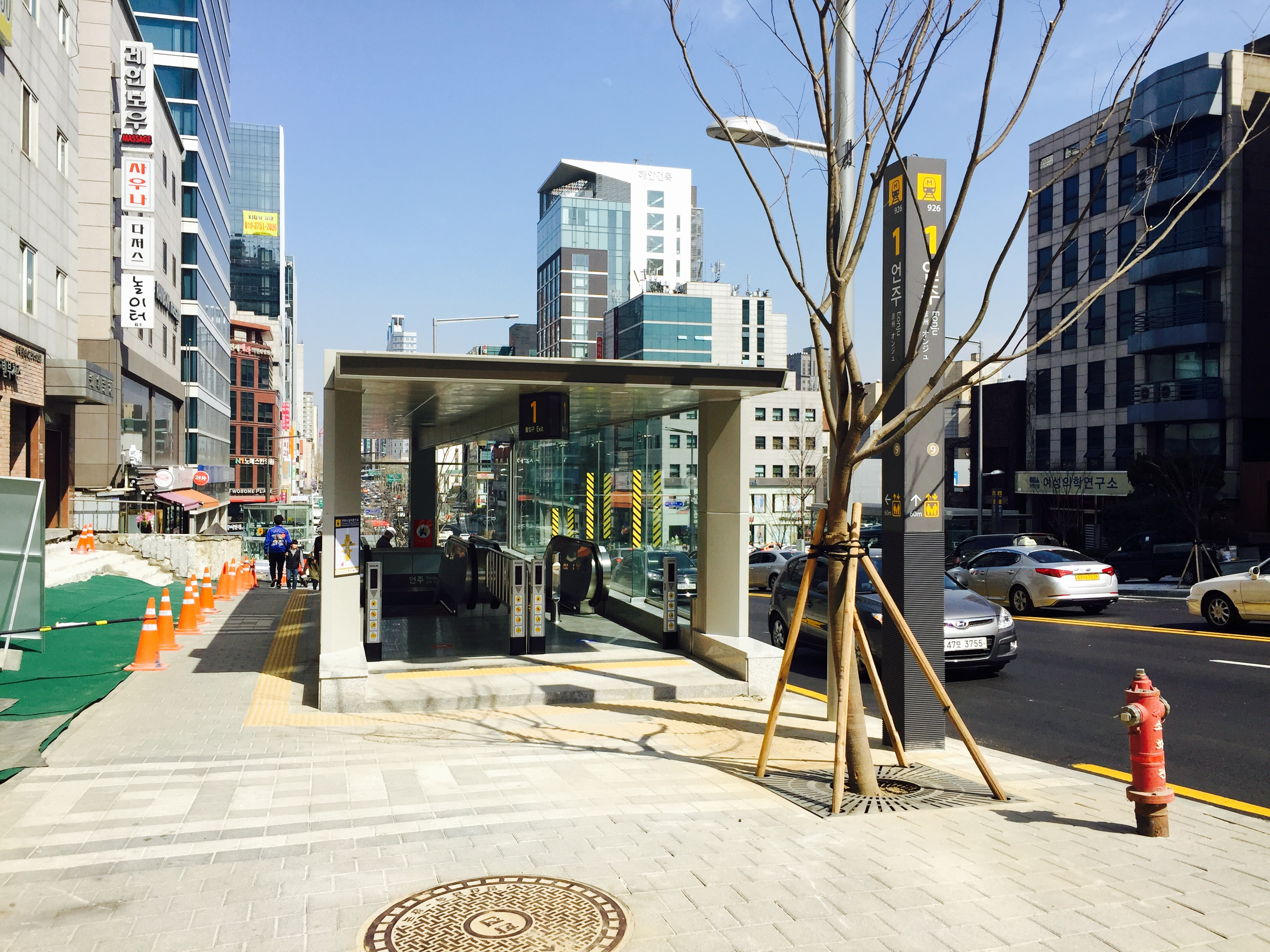

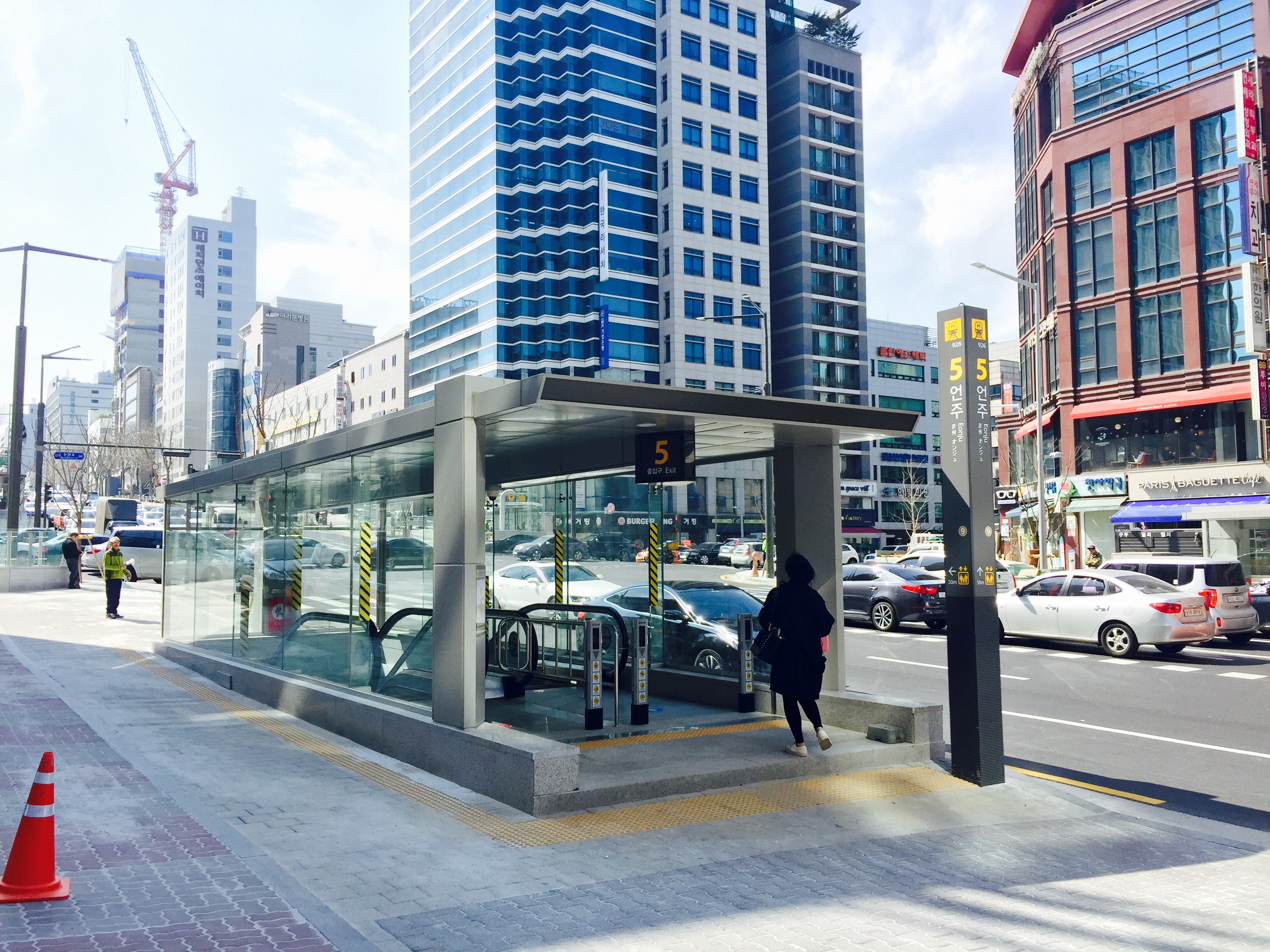

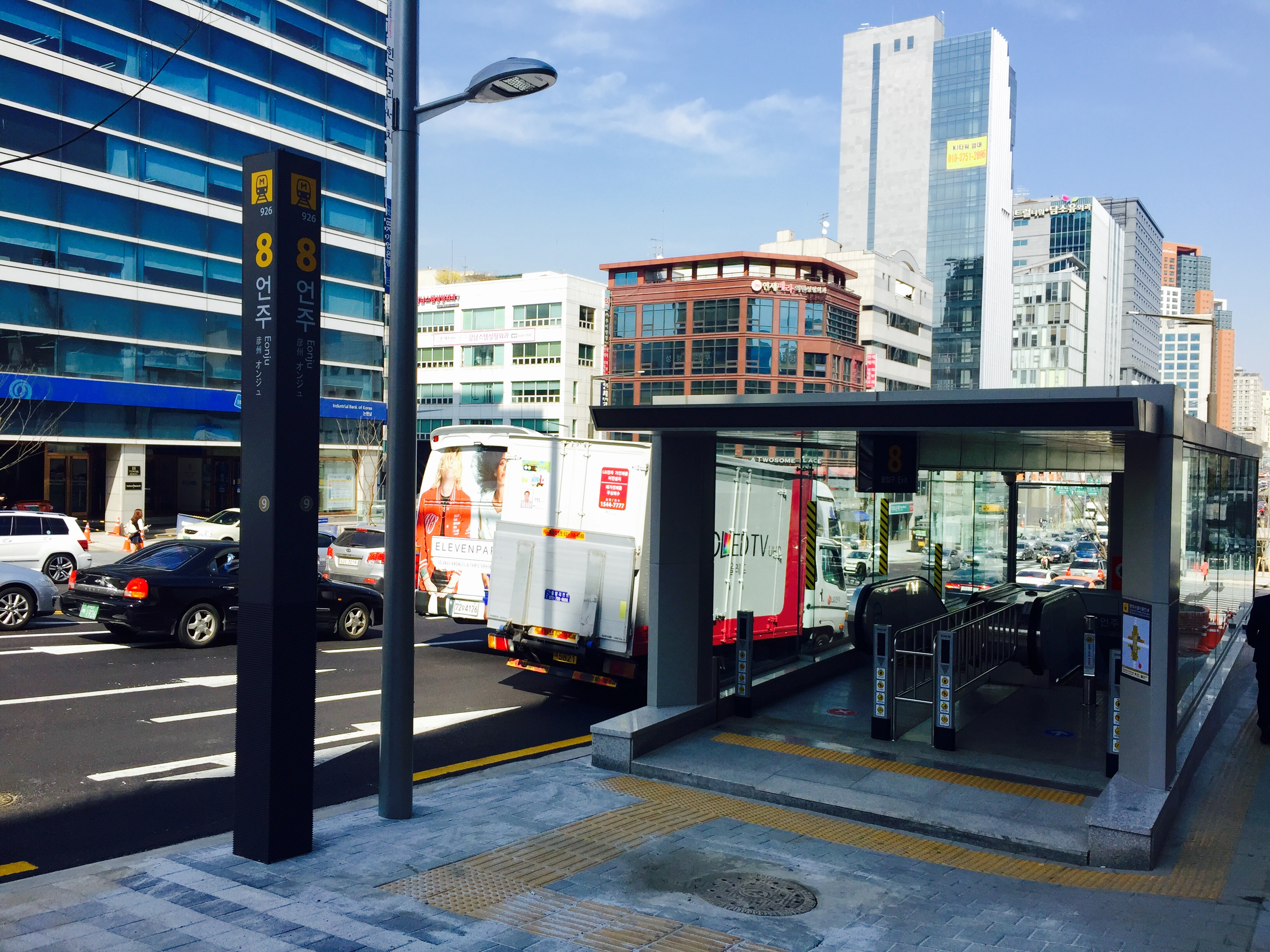

Preceding station	Seoul Metropolitan Subway	Following station
Sinnonhyeon towards Gaehwa	Line 9	Seonjeongneung towards VHS Medical Center
