= Bongeunsa station =

Station of the Seoul Metropolitan Subway

봉은사; Bongeunsa
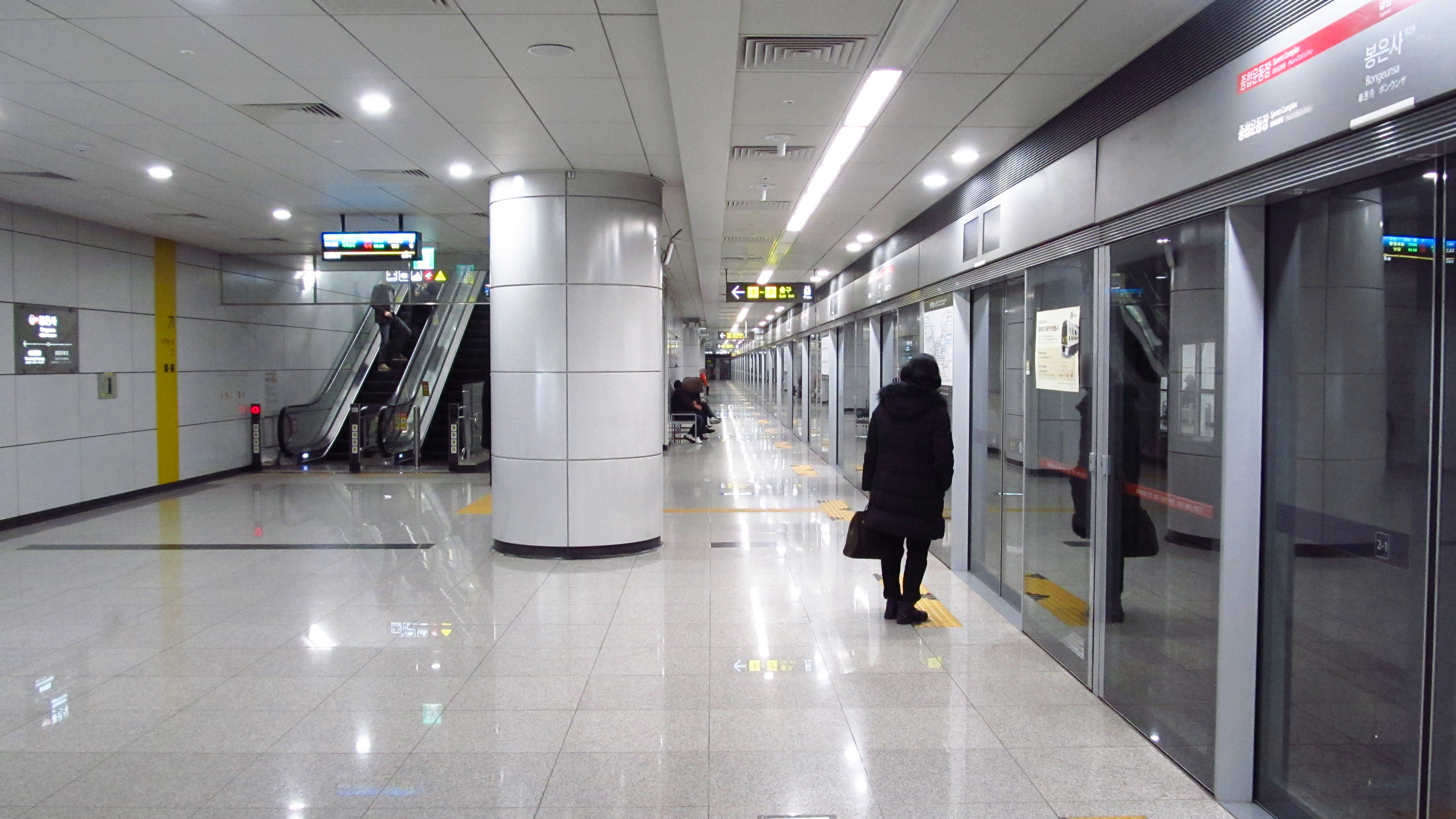
- Platform towards Gaehwa and Gimpo Int'l Airport

Korean name
- Hangul: 봉은사역
- Hanja: 奉恩寺驛
- Revised Romanization: Bongeunsa-yeok
- McCune–Reischauer: Pongŭnsa-yŏk

General information
- Location: Samseong-dong, Gangnam District, Seoul
- Coordinates: 37°30′51″N 127°03′37″E
- Operated by: Seoul Metro
- Line: Line 9
- Platforms: 2 side platforms
- Tracks: 2

Construction
- Structure type: Underground

Key dates
- March 28, 2015: Line 9 opened
Location

Bongeunsa Station is a station on Seoul Subway Line 9 that opened on March 28, 2015.

== Station layout ==
Seonjeongneung (express) ↑
Samseong Jungang (Local) ↑
S/B | | N/B
↓ Sports Complex

Northbound	← ● Line 9 toward Gaehwa (Local), Gimpo Int'l Airport (Express)
Southbound	● Line 9 toward VHS Medical Center (Local / Express) →

== Gallery ==
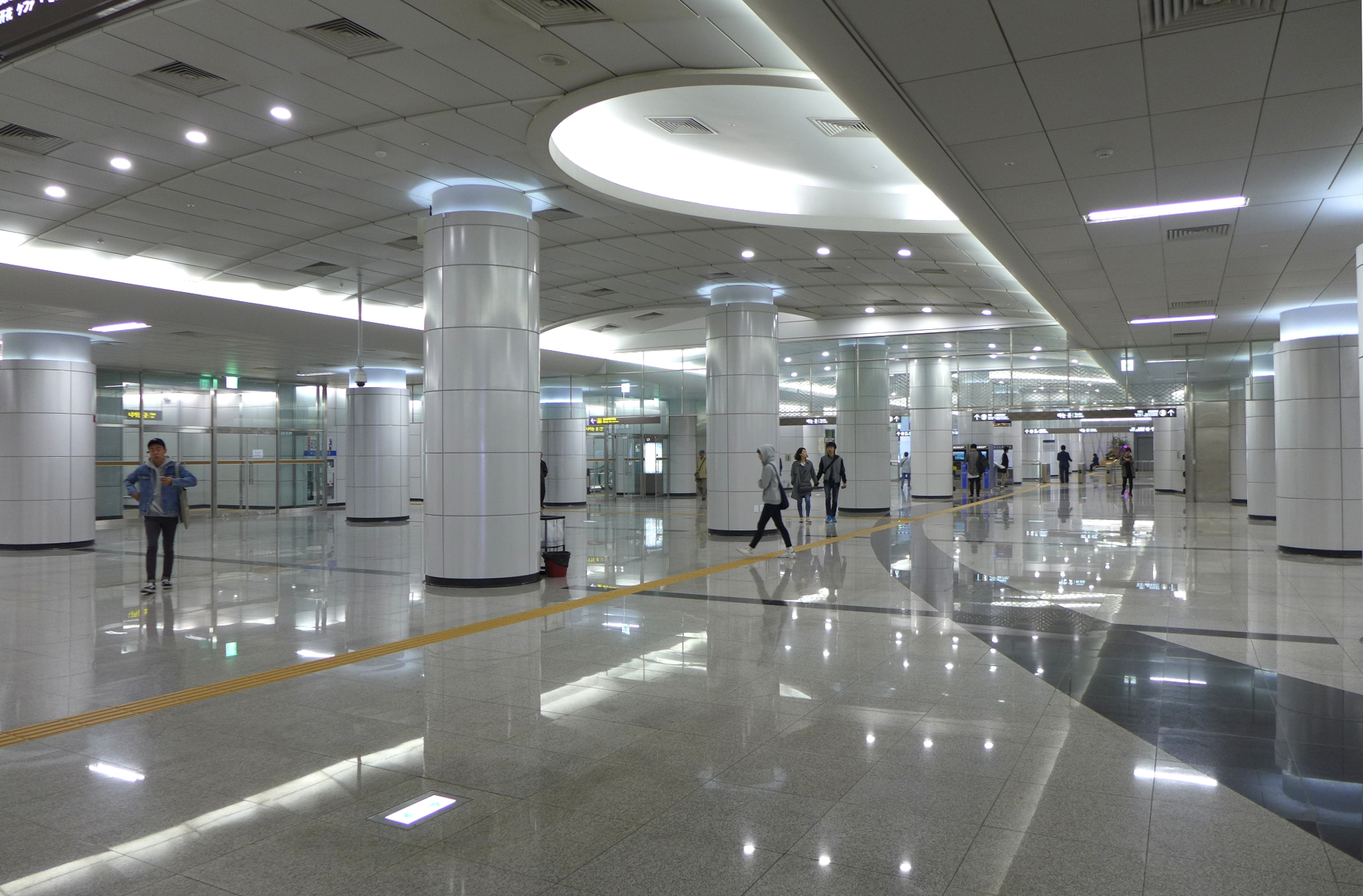
Station Concourse

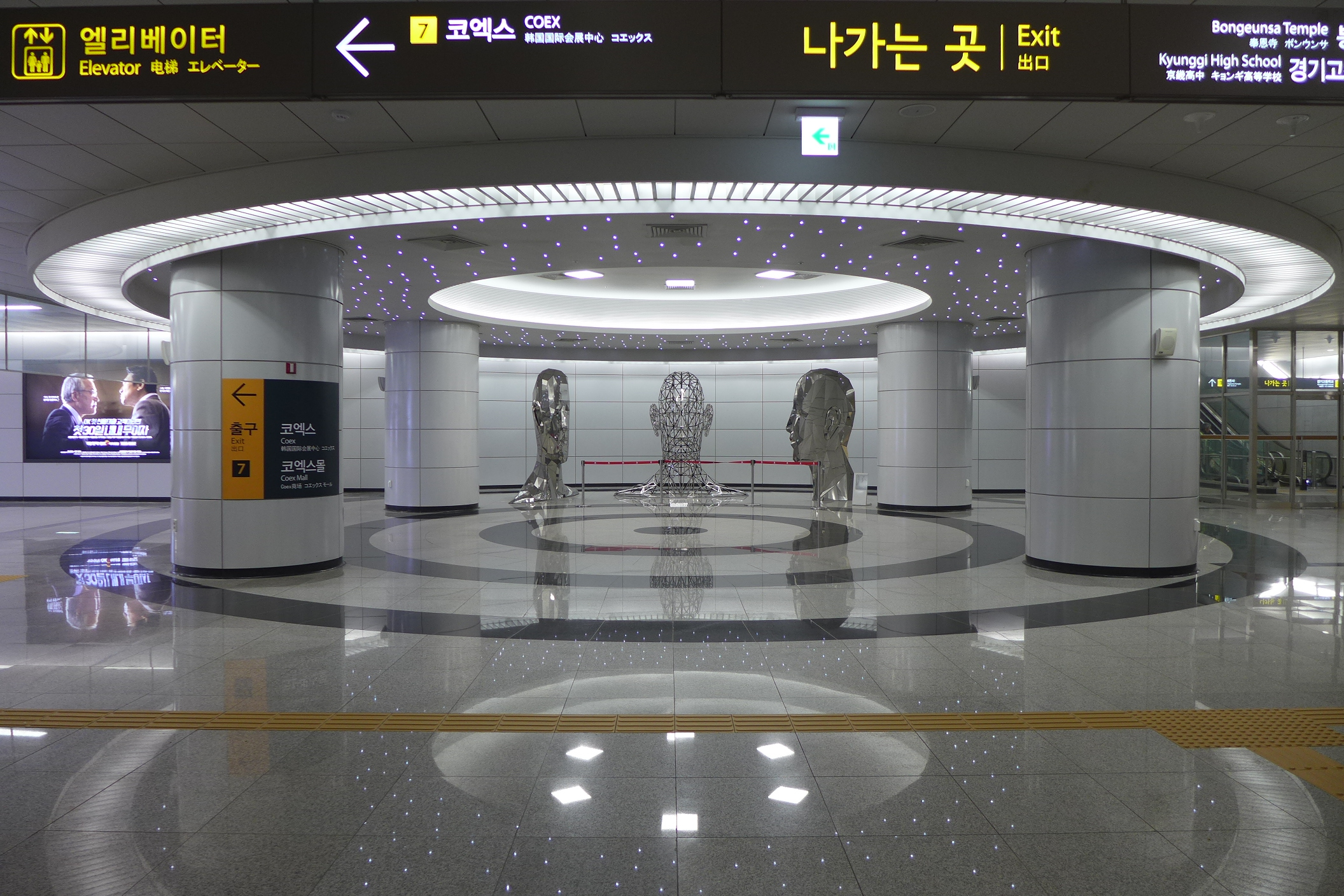
Station Sculpture

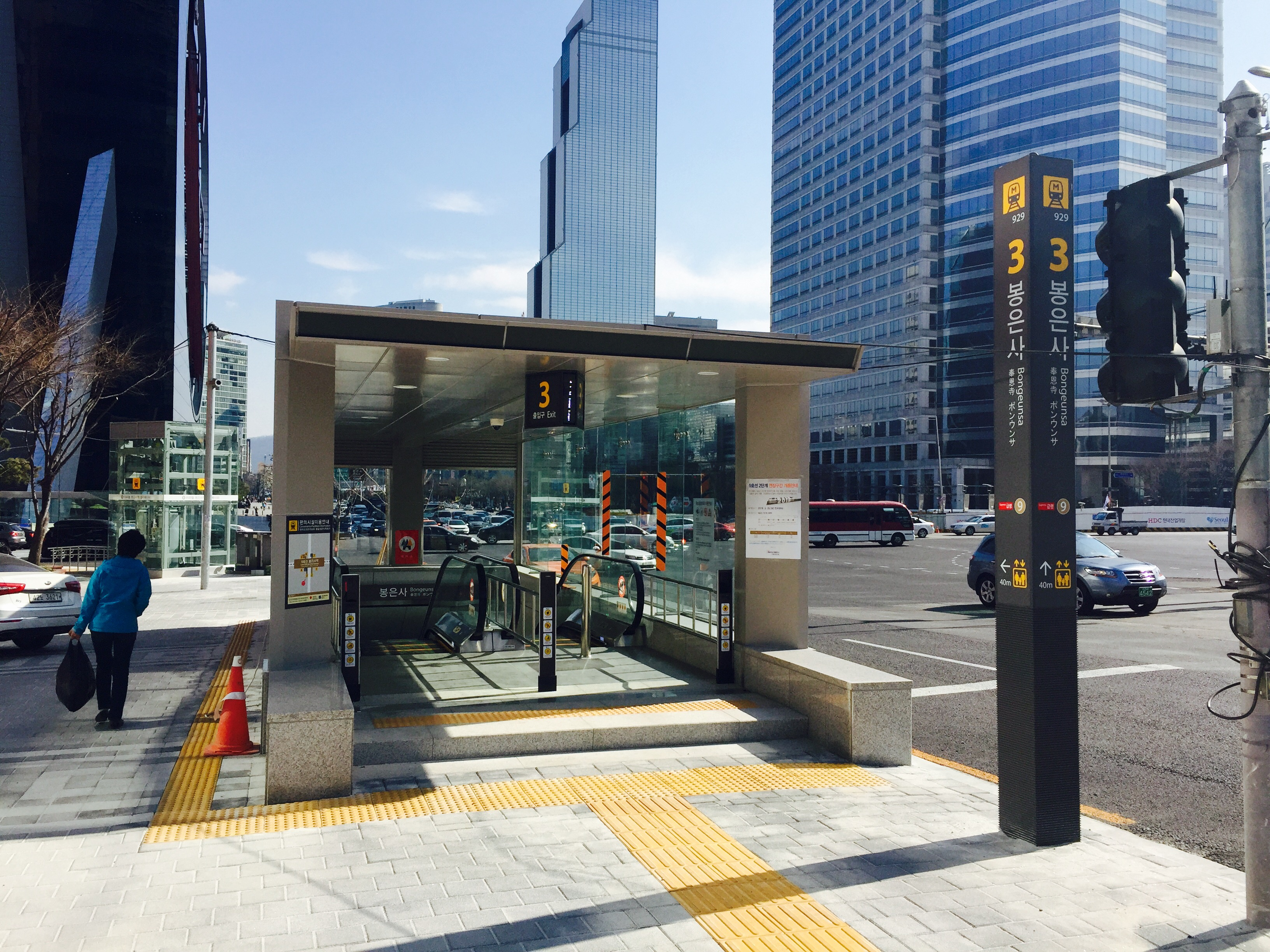
Exit 3

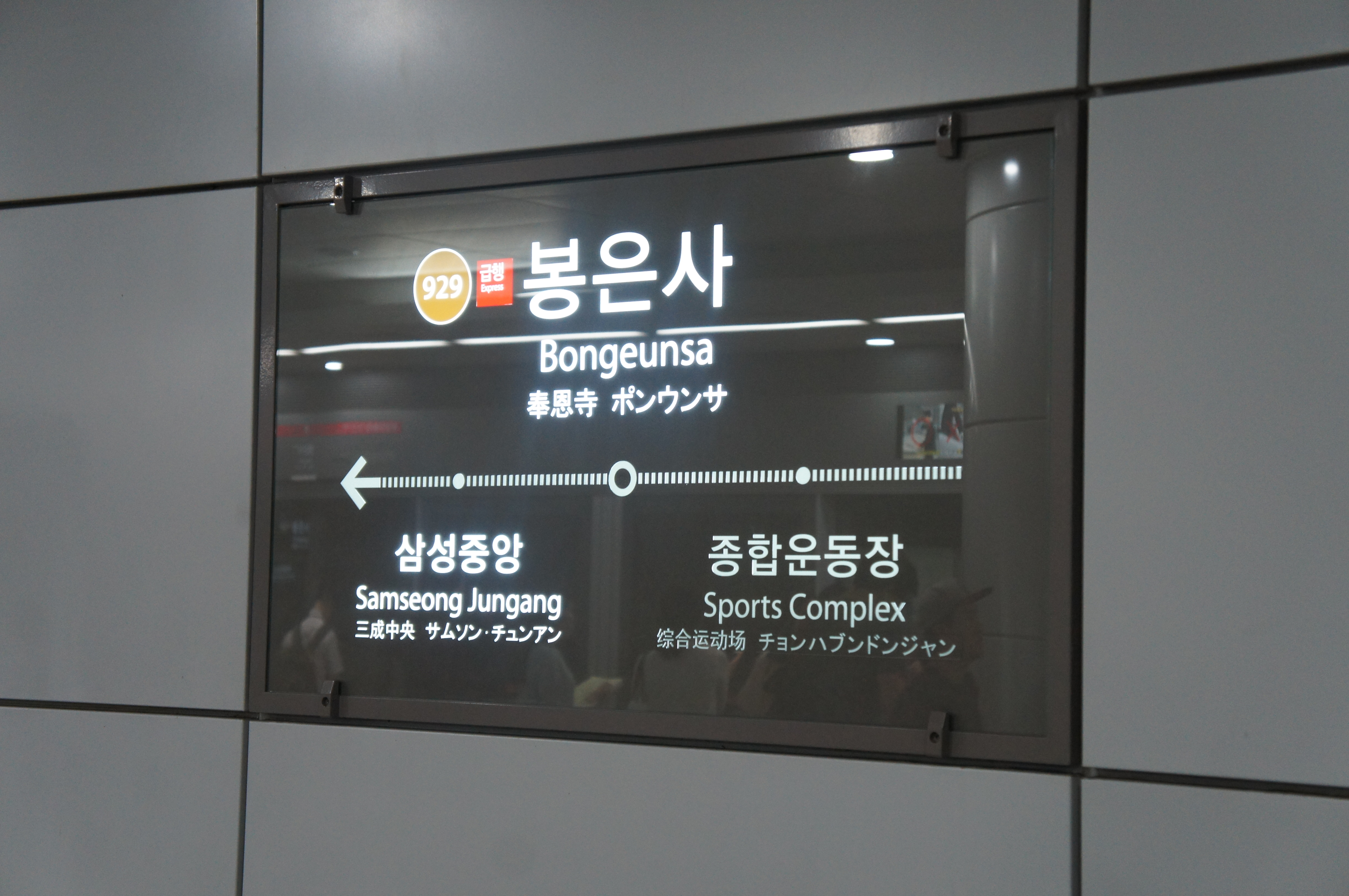
Station sign

== See also ==
- Bongeunsa
- COEX Convention & Exhibition Center

Preceding station	Seoul Metropolitan Subway	Following station
Samseong Jungang towards Gaehwa	Line 9	Sports Complex towards VHS Medical Center
Seonjeongneung towards Gimpo International Airport	Line 9 Express	Sports Complex towards VHS Medical Center
