= Seonjeongneung station =

Train station in South Korea

선정릉; Seonjeongneung
선정릉; Seonjeongneung
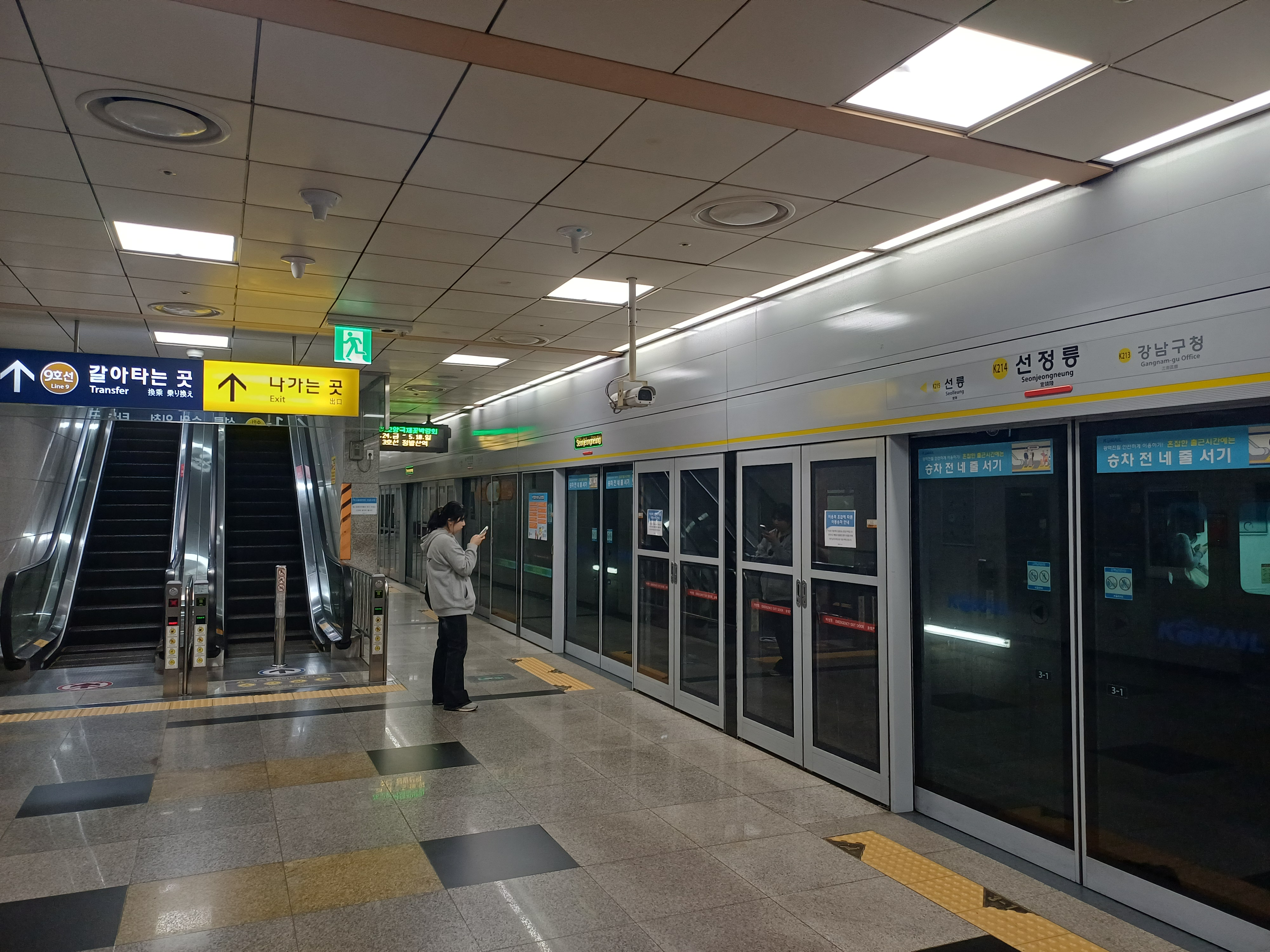
- Suin-Bundang Line platform

Korean name
- Hangul: 선정릉역
- Hanja: 宣靖陵驛
- Revised Romanization: Seonjeongneung-yeok
- McCune–Reischauer: Sŏnjŏngnŭng-yŏk

General information
- Coordinates: 37.5103°N 127.0438°E
- Operator: Seoul Metro; Korail
- Lines: Line 9 Suin–Bundang Line
- Platforms: 4
- Tracks: 4

Key dates
- March 28, 2015: Line 9 opened
- October 6, 2012: Suin–Bundang Line opened
Location

Seonjeongneung station is a Seoul Subway station on the Suin–Bundang Line and Seoul Subway Line 9. The Bundang Line portion opened October 2012. The station is named after the nearby Seonjeongneung, the Joseon Dynasty royal tombs Seolleung (선릉, 宣陵) and Jeongneung (정릉, 靖陵). It became a transfer station with Seoul Subway Line 9 on March 28, 2015.

== Station layout ==
=== Line 9 ===
Sinnonhyeon (Express) ↑
Eonju (local) ↑
S/B | | N/B
↓ Bongeunsa (Express)
↓ Samseong Jungang (local)

Northbound Local	← ● Line 9 toward Gaehwa (local), Gimpo Int'l Airport (express)
Southbound Local	● Line 9 toward VHS Medical Center →

=== Suin–Bundang Line ===
↑ Gangnam-gu Office
N/B | | S/B
Seolleung ↓

Southbound	● Suin–Bundang Line toward Incheon →
Northbound	← ● Suin–Bundang Line toward Cheongnyangni

== Gallery ==
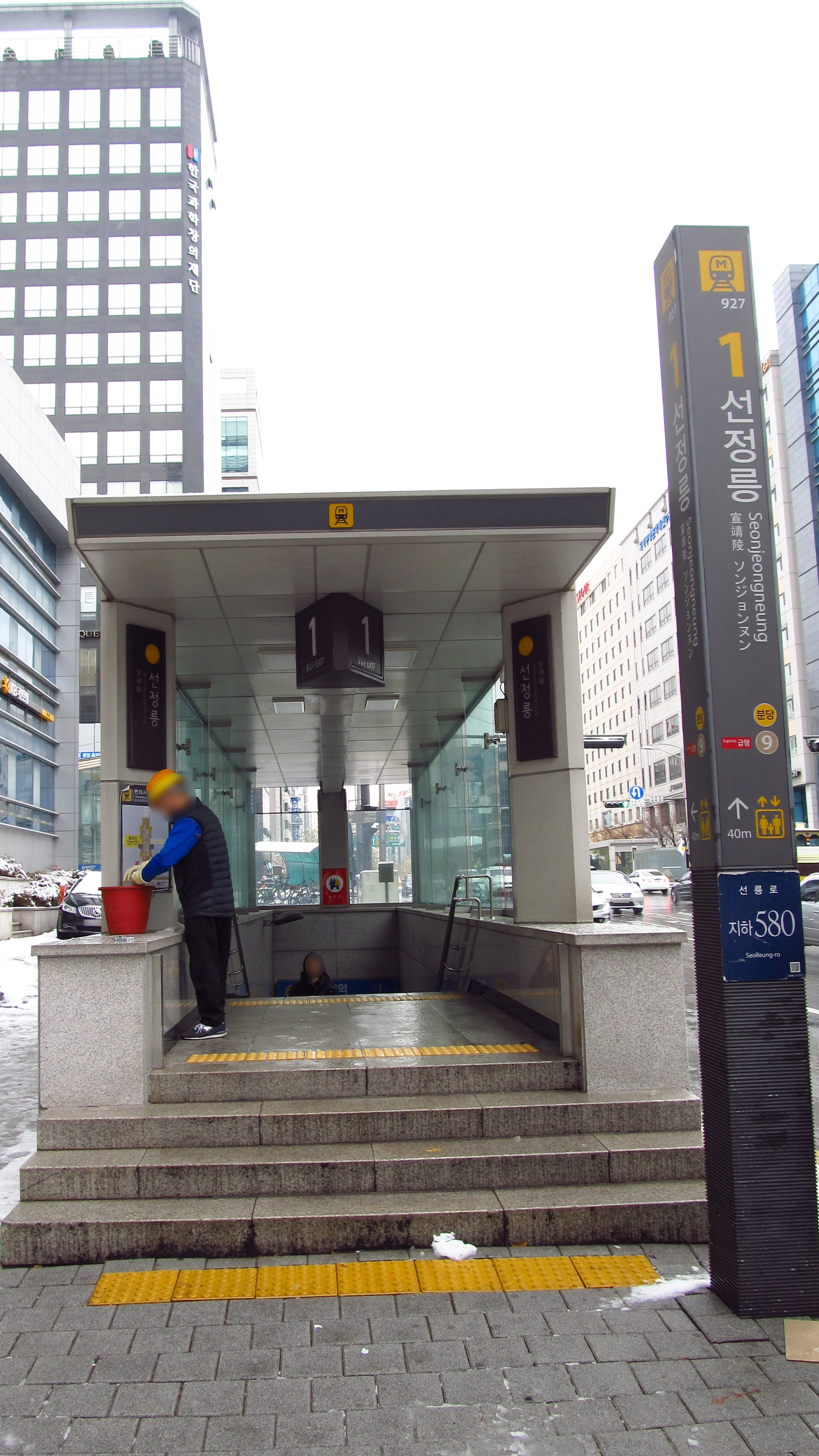
Exit 1

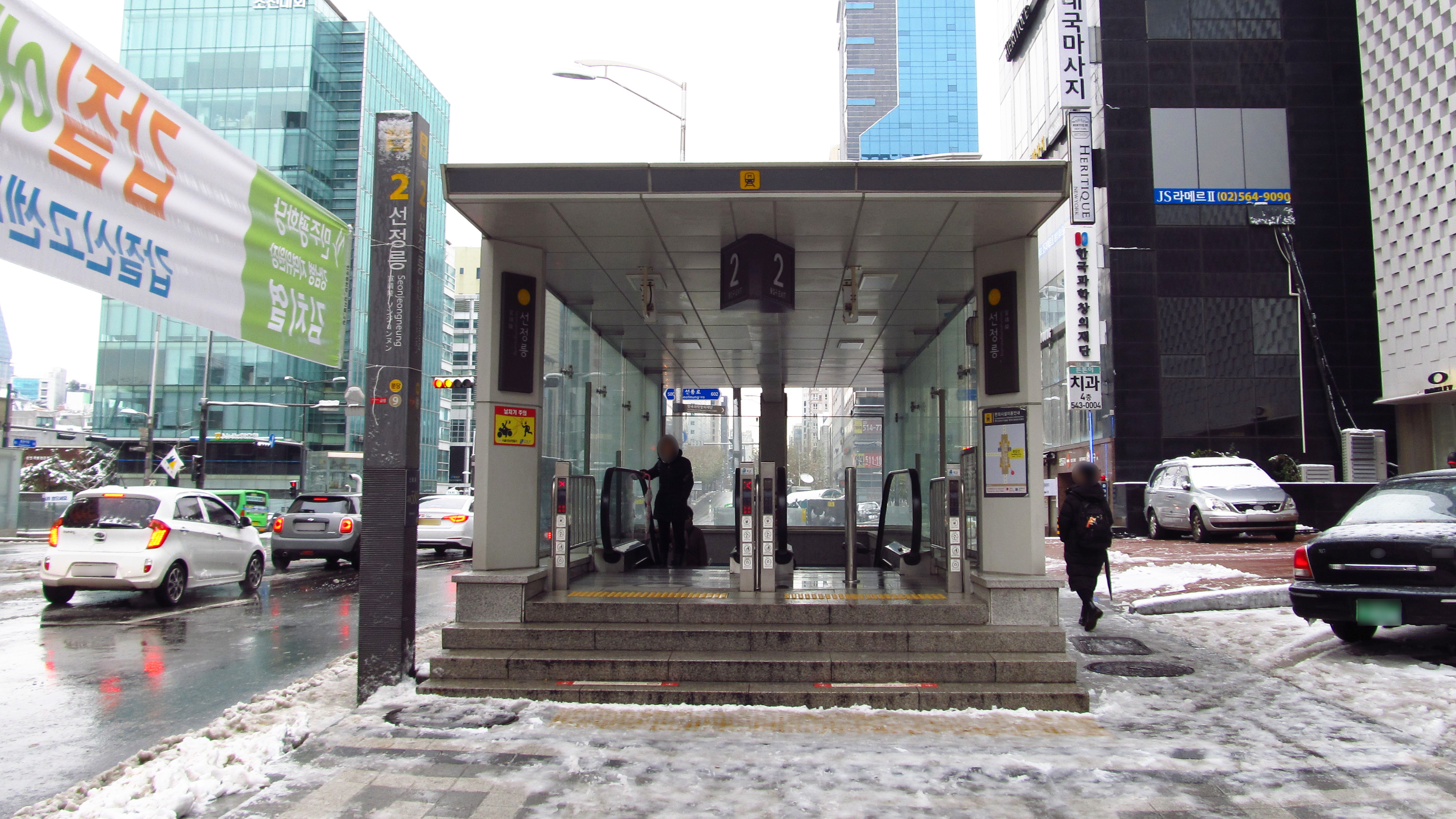
Exit 2

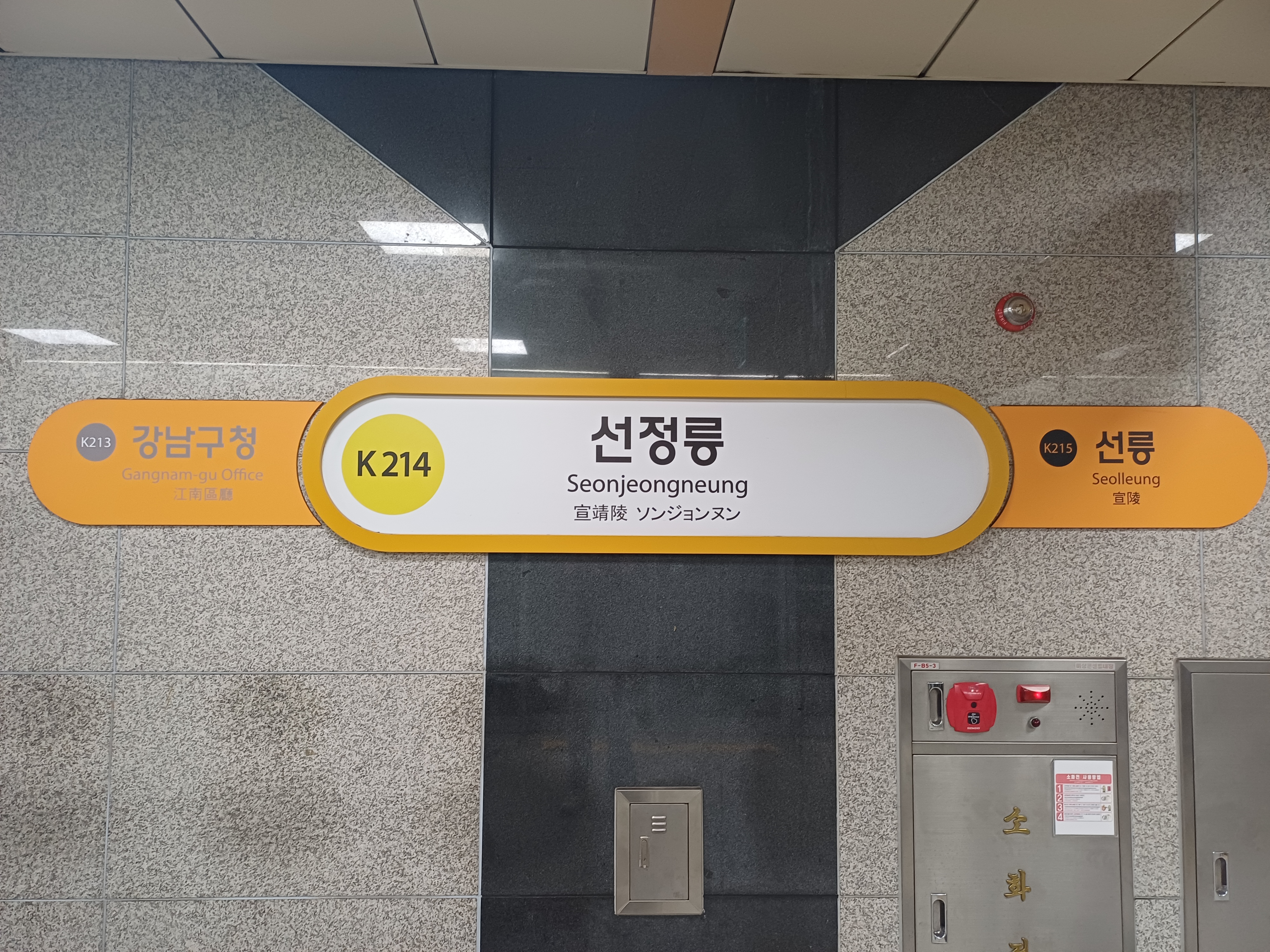
Suin-Bundang Line station nameplate

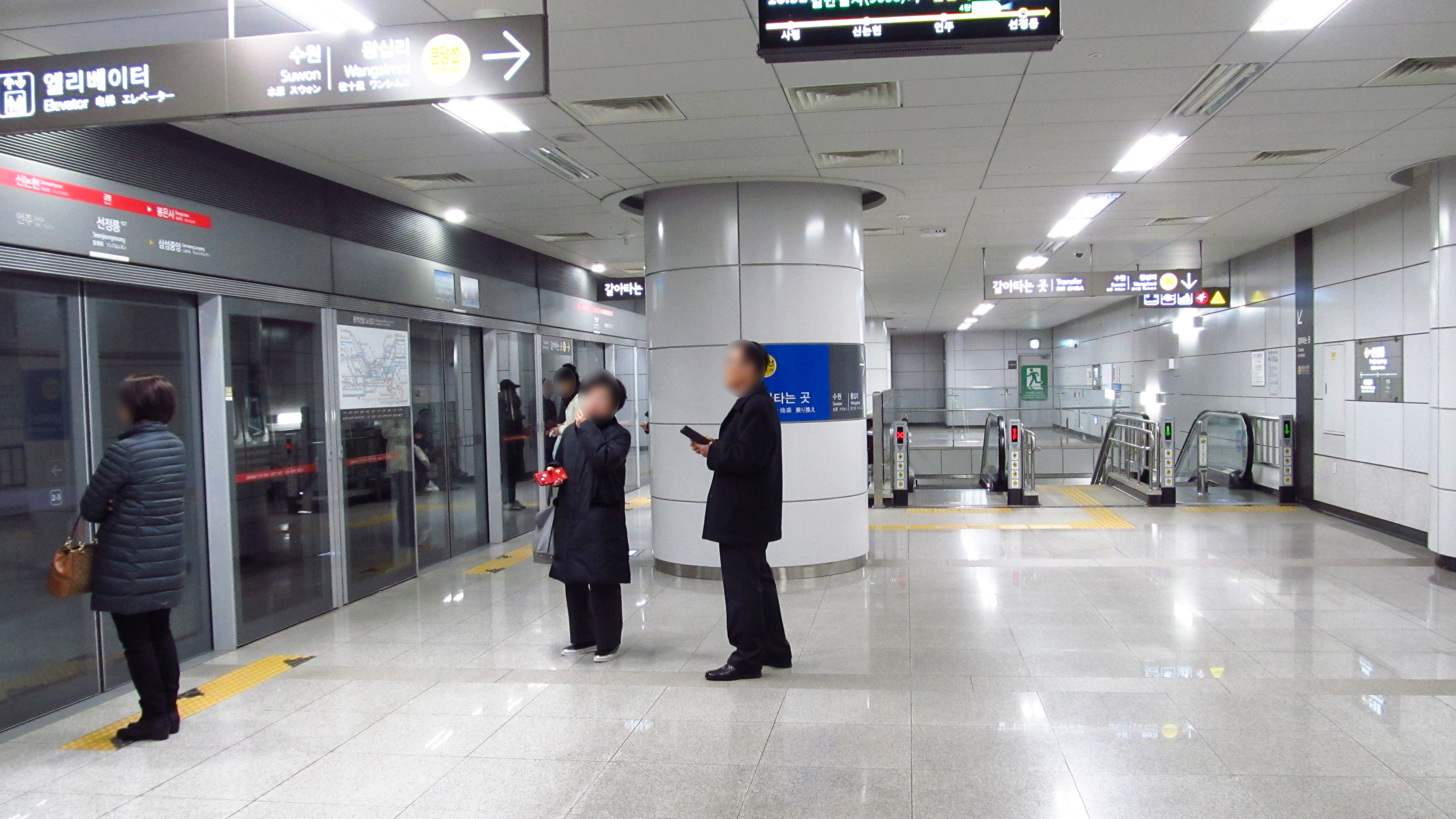
Line 9 platform

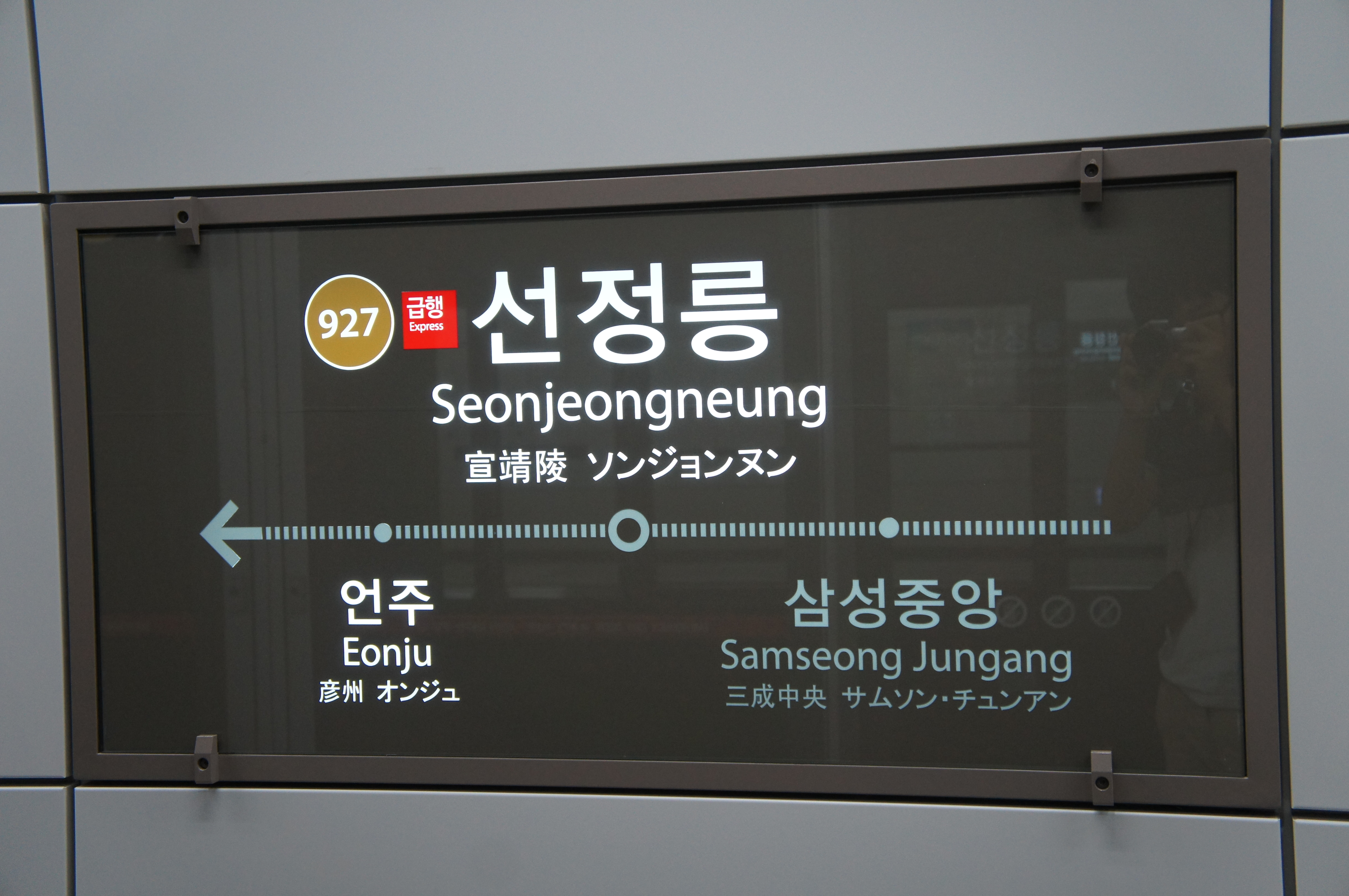
Line 9 station nameplate

Preceding station	Seoul Metropolitan Subway	Following station
Eonju towards Gaehwa	Line 9	Samseong Jungang towards VHS Medical Center
Sinnonhyeon towards Gimpo International Airport	Line 9 Express	Bongeunsa towards VHS Medical Center
Gangnam-gu Office towards Cheongnyangni	Suin–Bundang Line	Seolleung towards Incheon
