= Samseong Jungang station =

Railway station in Gangnam District, South Korea

Coordinates: 37.5128°N 127.0525°E

삼성중앙; Samseong Jungang
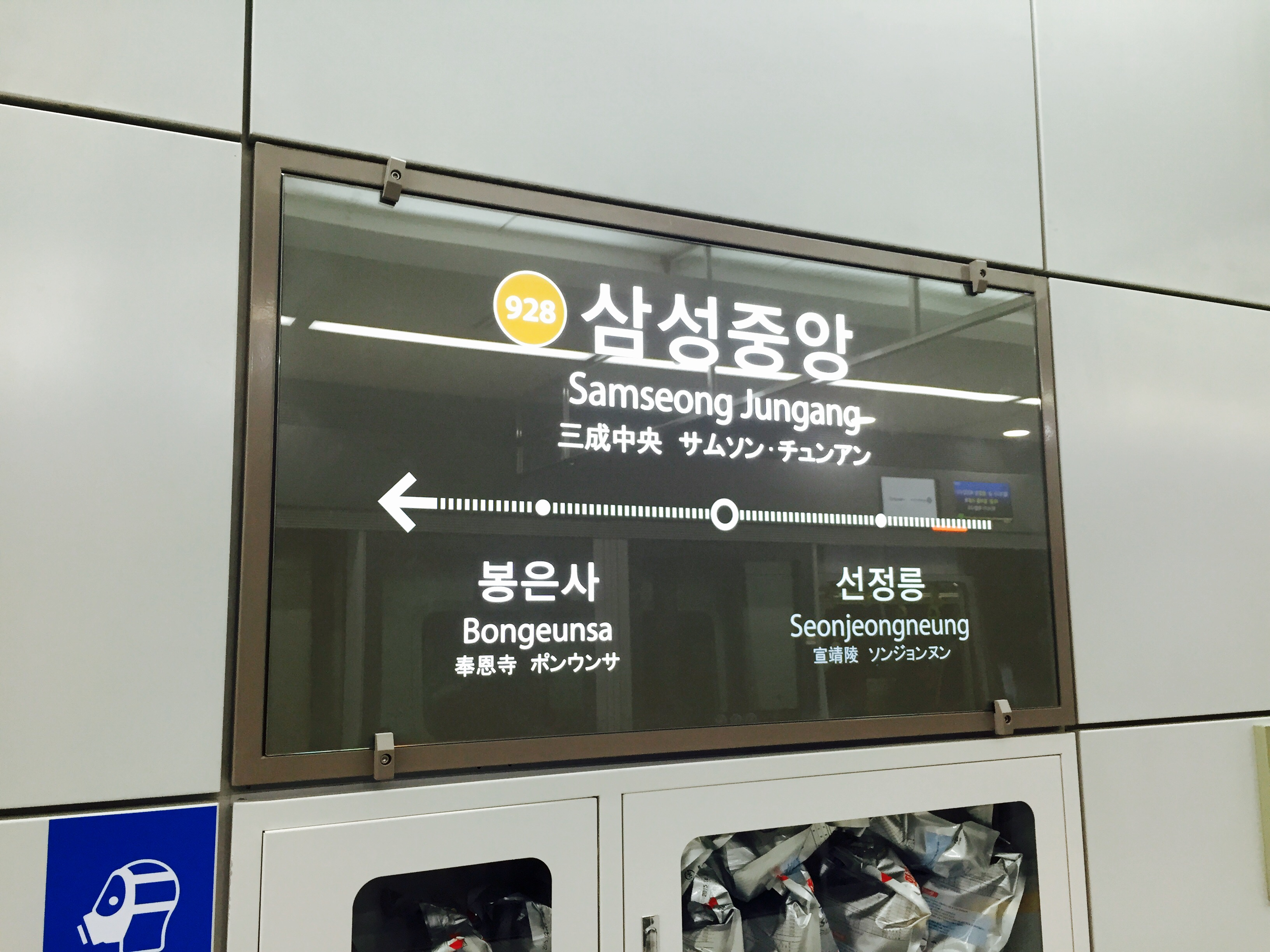

Korean name
- Hangul: 삼성중앙역
- Hanja: 三成中央驛
- Revised Romanization: Samseongjungangyeok
- McCune–Reischauer: Samsŏngjungangyŏk

General information
- Location: Samseong-dong, Gangnam-gu, Seoul
- Operated by: Seoul Metro
- Line(s): Line 9
- Platforms: 2 side platforms
- Tracks: 4 (2 bypass tracks)

Construction
- Structure type: Underground

Key dates
- March 28, 2015: Line 9 opened

Samseong Jungang Station is a railway station on Seoul Subway Line 9 that opened March 28, 2015.

== Station layout ==
Seonjeongneung ↑
| | | N/B
↓ Bongeunsa

Northbound	← ● Line 9 local toward Gaehwa
Southbound	● Line 9 local toward VHS Medical Center →

== Gallery ==
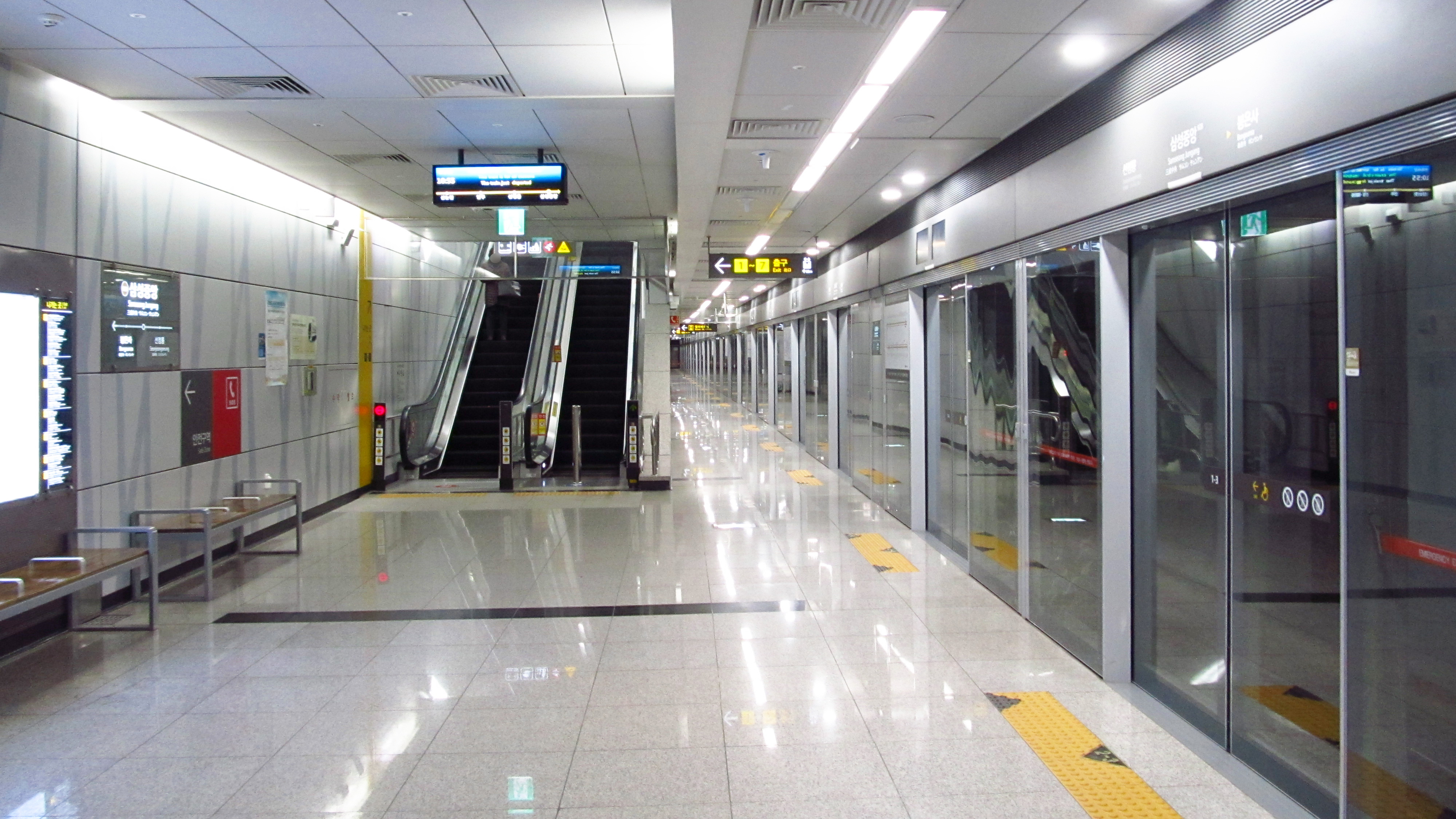

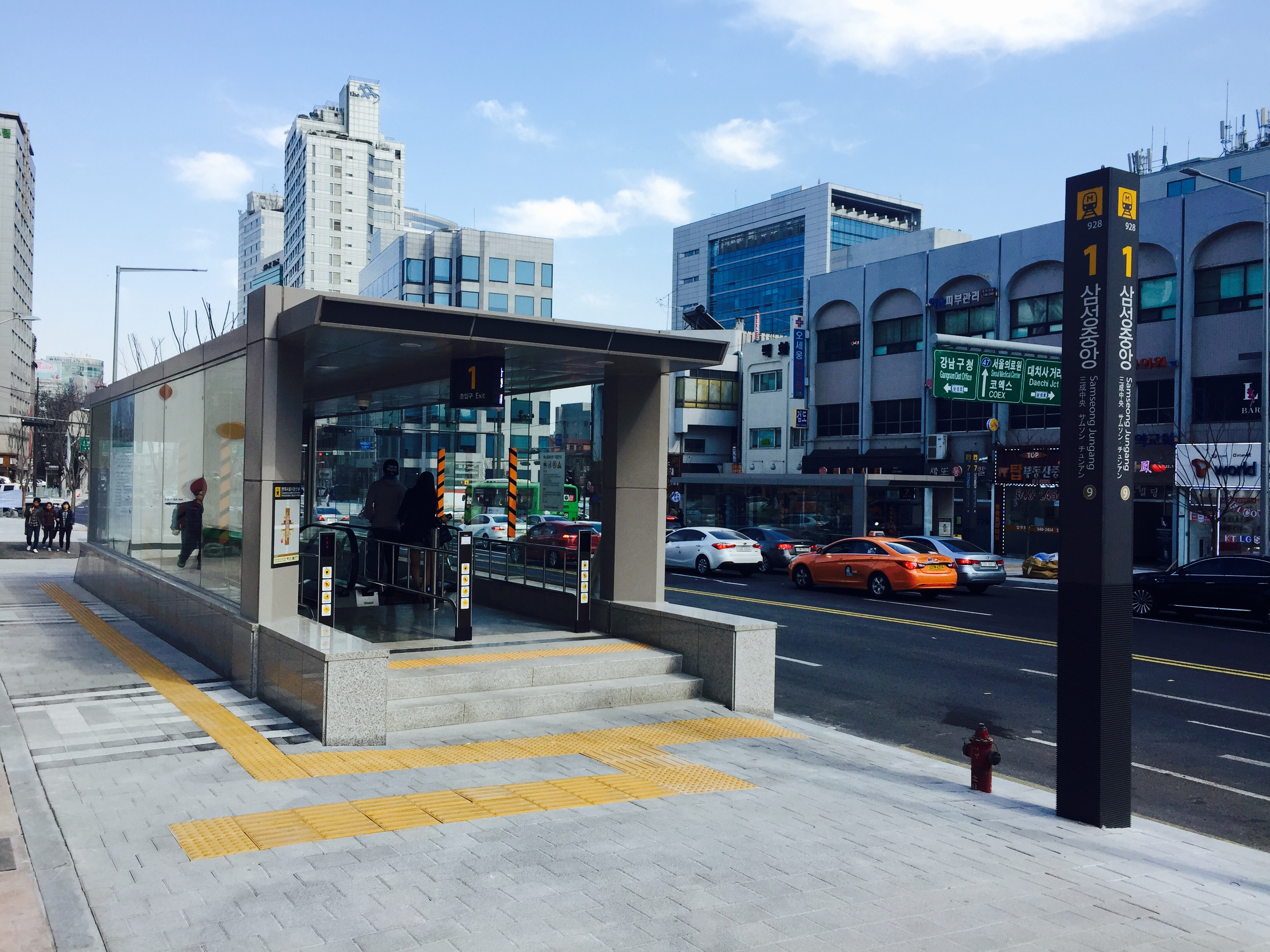

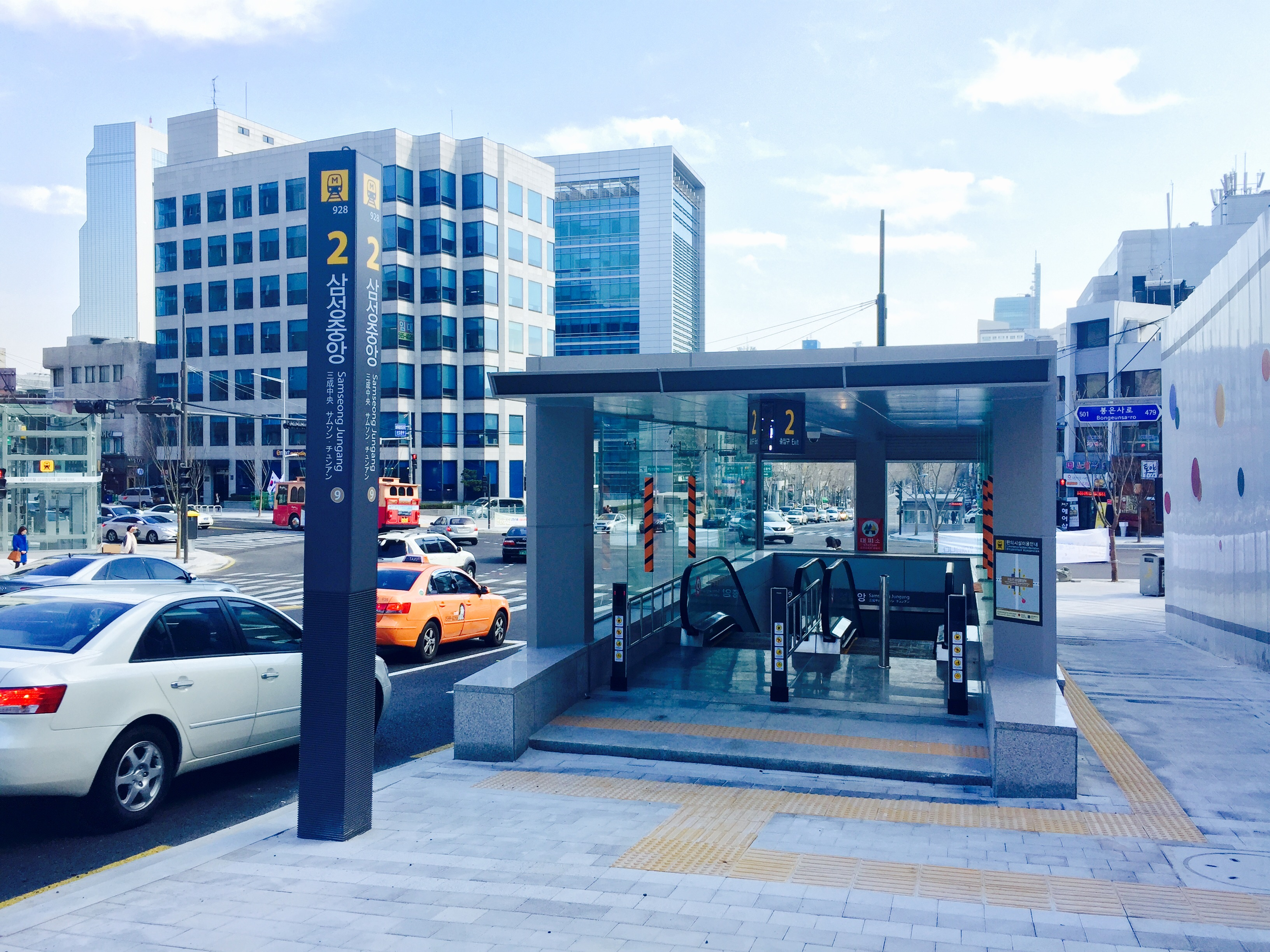

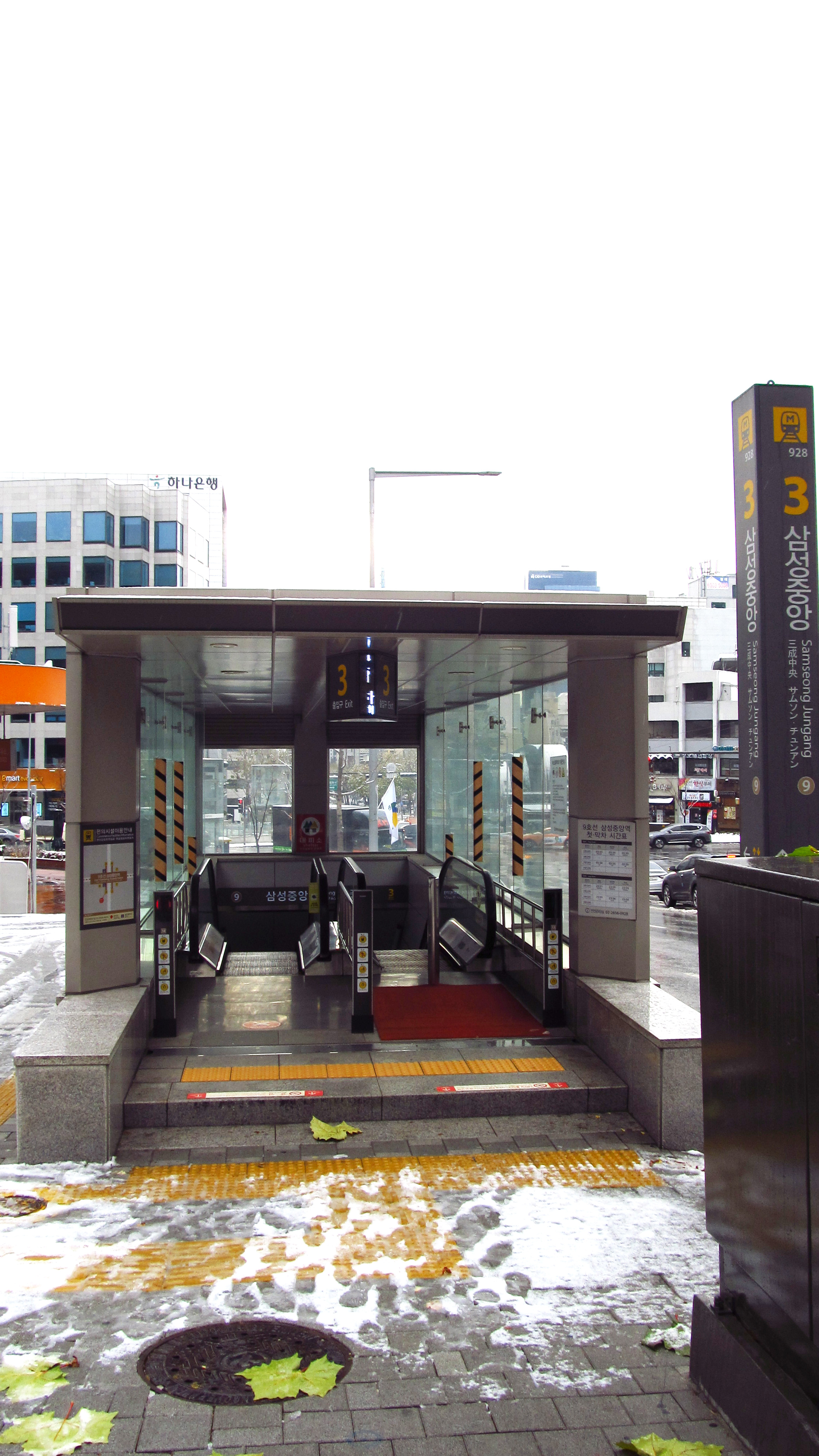

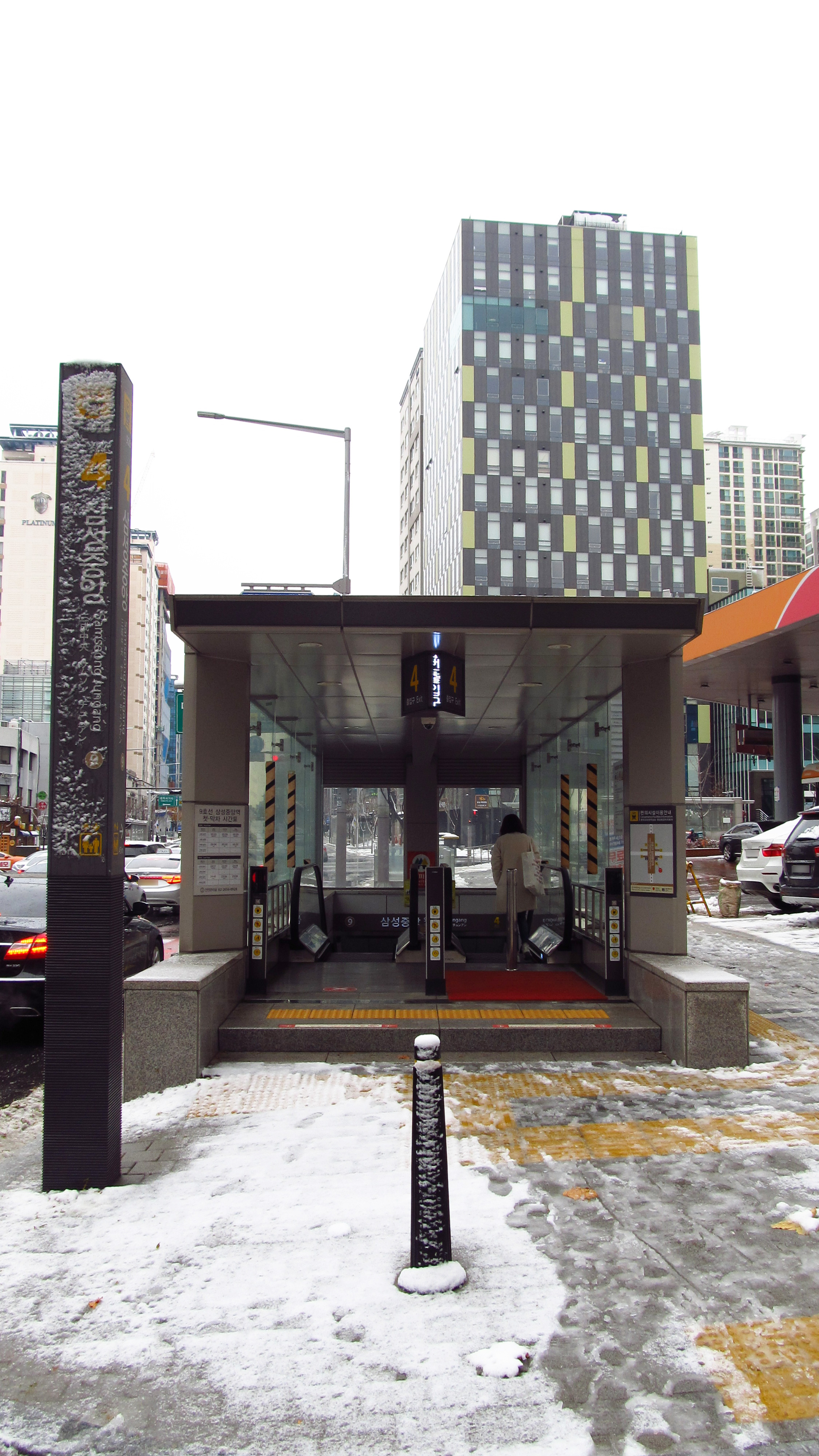

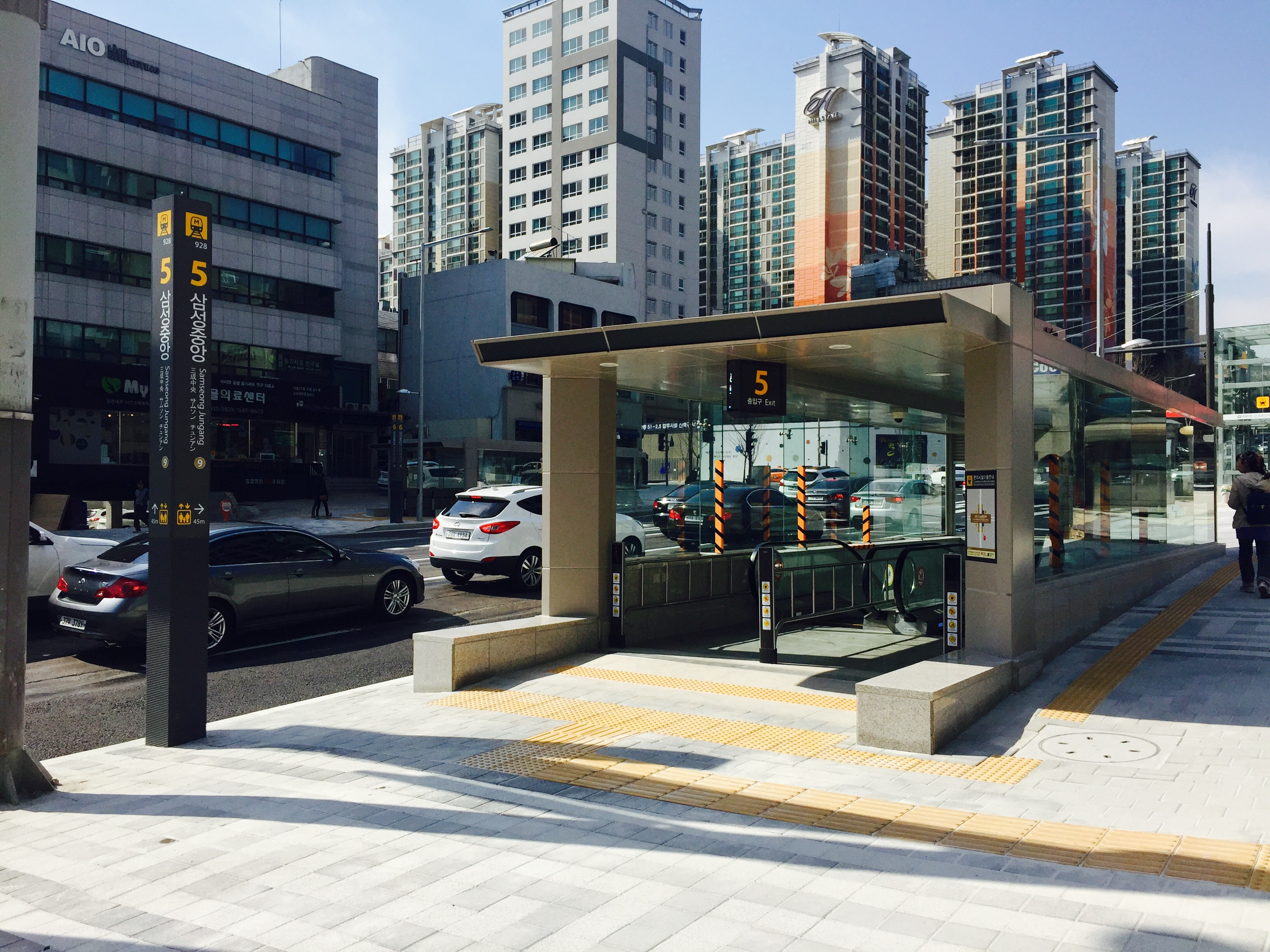

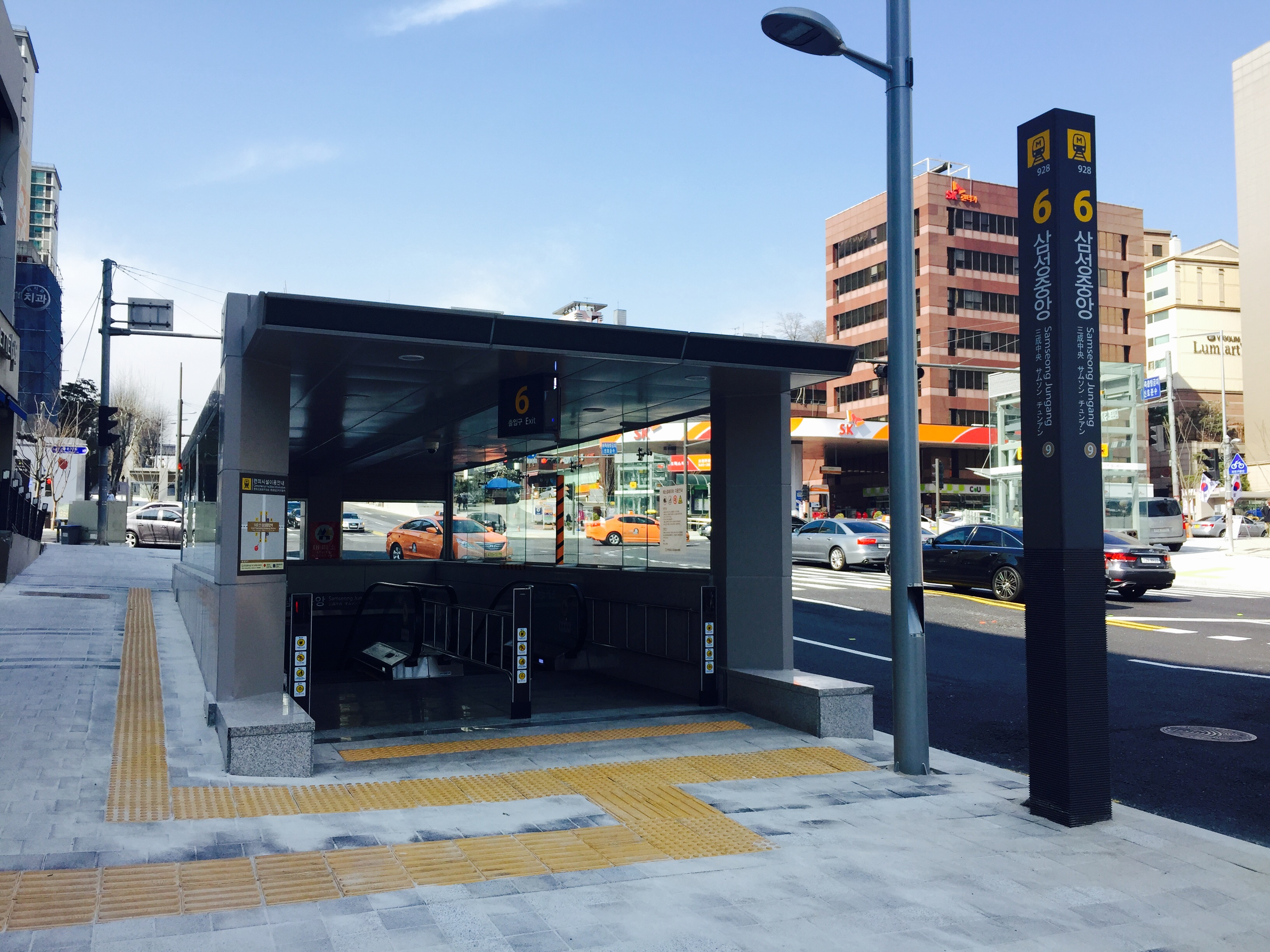

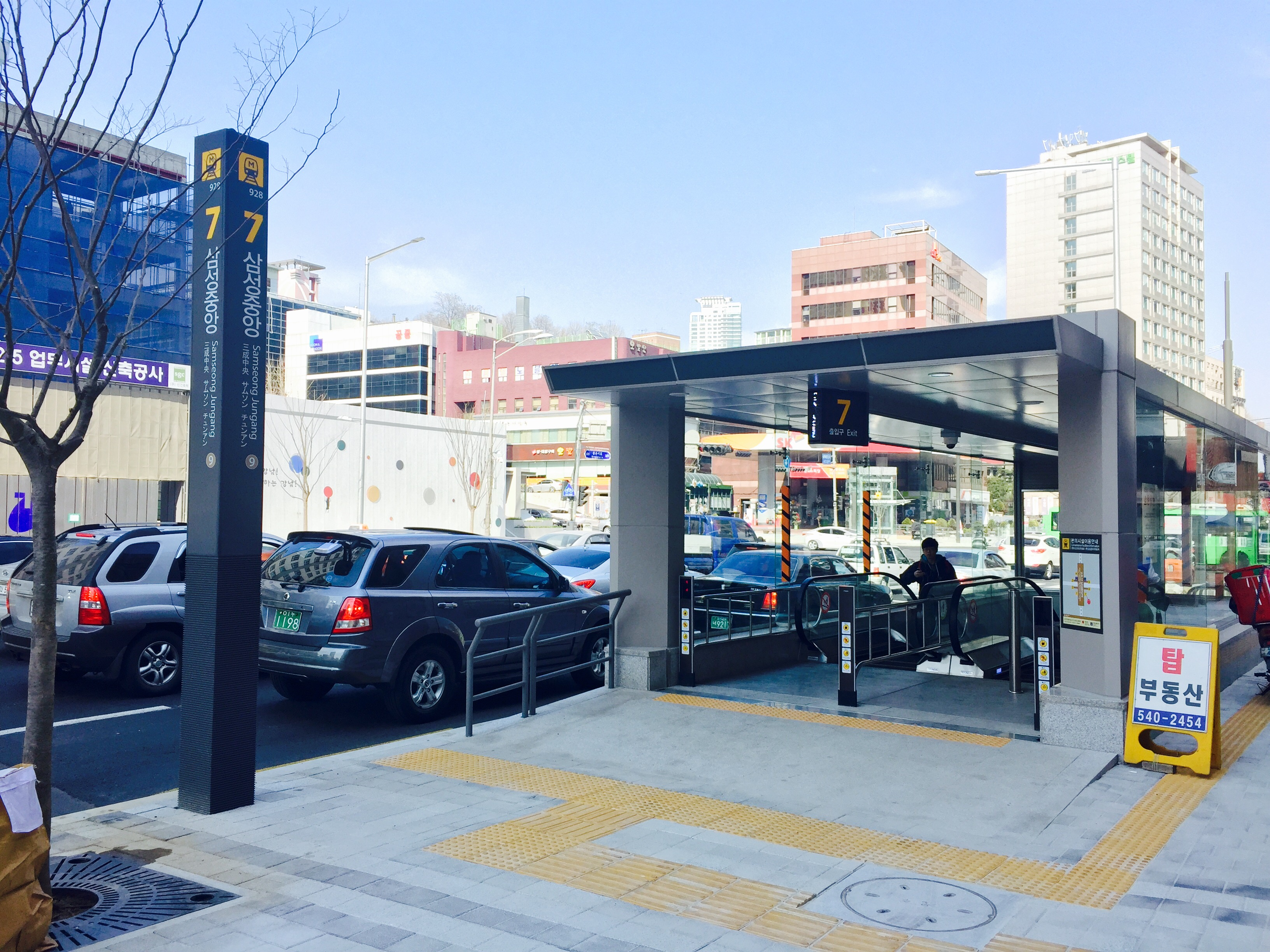

Preceding station	Seoul Metropolitan Subway	Following station
Seonjeongneung towards Gaehwa	Line 9	Bongeunsa towards VHS Medical Center
