= Hwaseong Fortress =

Fortress in Gyeonggi Province, South Korea

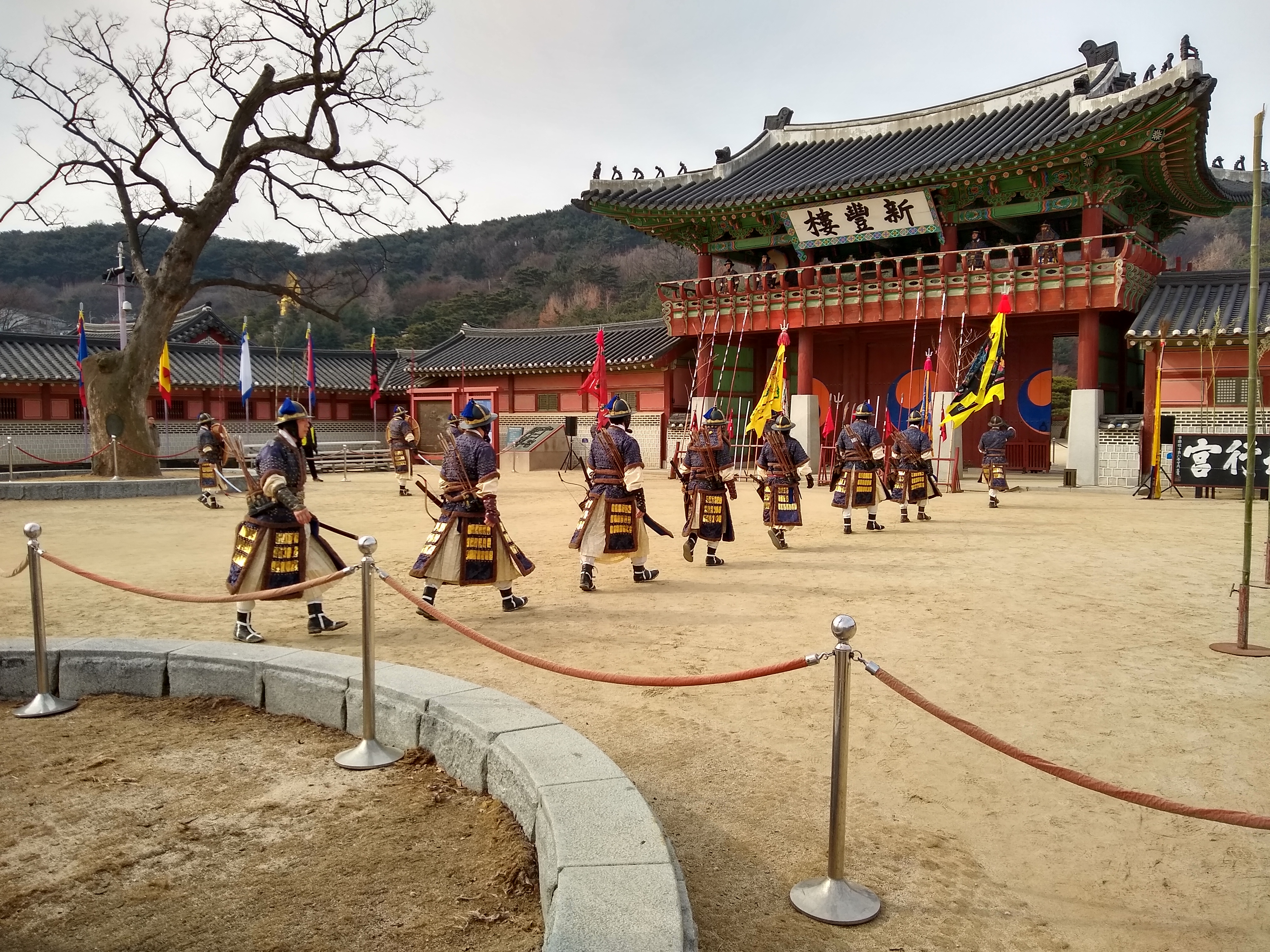
- Interactive map of Hwaseong Fortress
- 37°16′20″N 127°0′30″E
- Location: Suwon, Gyeonggi Province, South Korea

Site notes
- Website: www.swcf.or.kr

UNESCO World Heritage Site
- Type: Cultural
- Criteria: ii, iii
- Designated: 1997
- Reference no.: 817

Historic Sites of South Korea
- Official name: Hwaseong Fortress, Suwon
- Designated: 1963-01-21
- Reference no.: 3

Korean name
- Hangul: 수원 화성
- Hanja: 水原華城
- RR: Suwon hwaseong
- MR: Suwŏn hwasŏng

Hwaseong Fortress or Suwon Hwaseong (Korean: 수원 화성) is a Korean fortress surrounding the centre of Suwon, the provincial capital of Gyeonggi Province, South Korea. It was built from 1794 to 1796 by King Jeongjo of Joseon to house and honor the remains of his biological father, Crown Prince Sado. Sado had been executed by being locked in a rice chest by his father, King Yeongjo. Located 30 kilometres (19 mi) south of Seoul and enclosing much of central Suwon, the fortress includes King Jeongjo's temporary palace. The fortress and enclosed palace were designated as a World Heritage Site by UNESCO in 1997. It comprises among many other features a perimeter wall, four main gates, and two sluicegates over the Suwoncheon, Suwon's main stream, which flows through the centre of the fortress.

== Background ==
King Jeongjo apparently built Hwaseong Fortress to prepare for a move of the capital from Seoul to Suwon. Suwon was purported to be strategically positioned to connect Seoul with the West Sea (Yellow Sea) and China. The king wanted to leave the factional strife of the court to carry out reforms and believed that Suwon had the potential to grow into a new and prosperous capital. To encourage growth, he ordered people to move to Suwon at considerable expense and exempted them from taxes for ten years. King Jeongjo also ordered public works, such as the building of educational facilities to better facilitate the city as a capital.

Suwon Hwaseong Fortress was restored based on the Hwaseong Seongyeok Uigwe, a design drawing from 200 years ago. The Hwaseong Seongyeok Uigwe is a blueprint showing the appearance of Suwon Hwaseong Fortress, the tools used to build it, and the location of Suwon Hwaseong Fortress.

Because Suwon Hwaseong Fortress was restored based on original blueprints, it managed to be registered as a World Cultural Heritage despite being a modern restored building.

== Construction ==
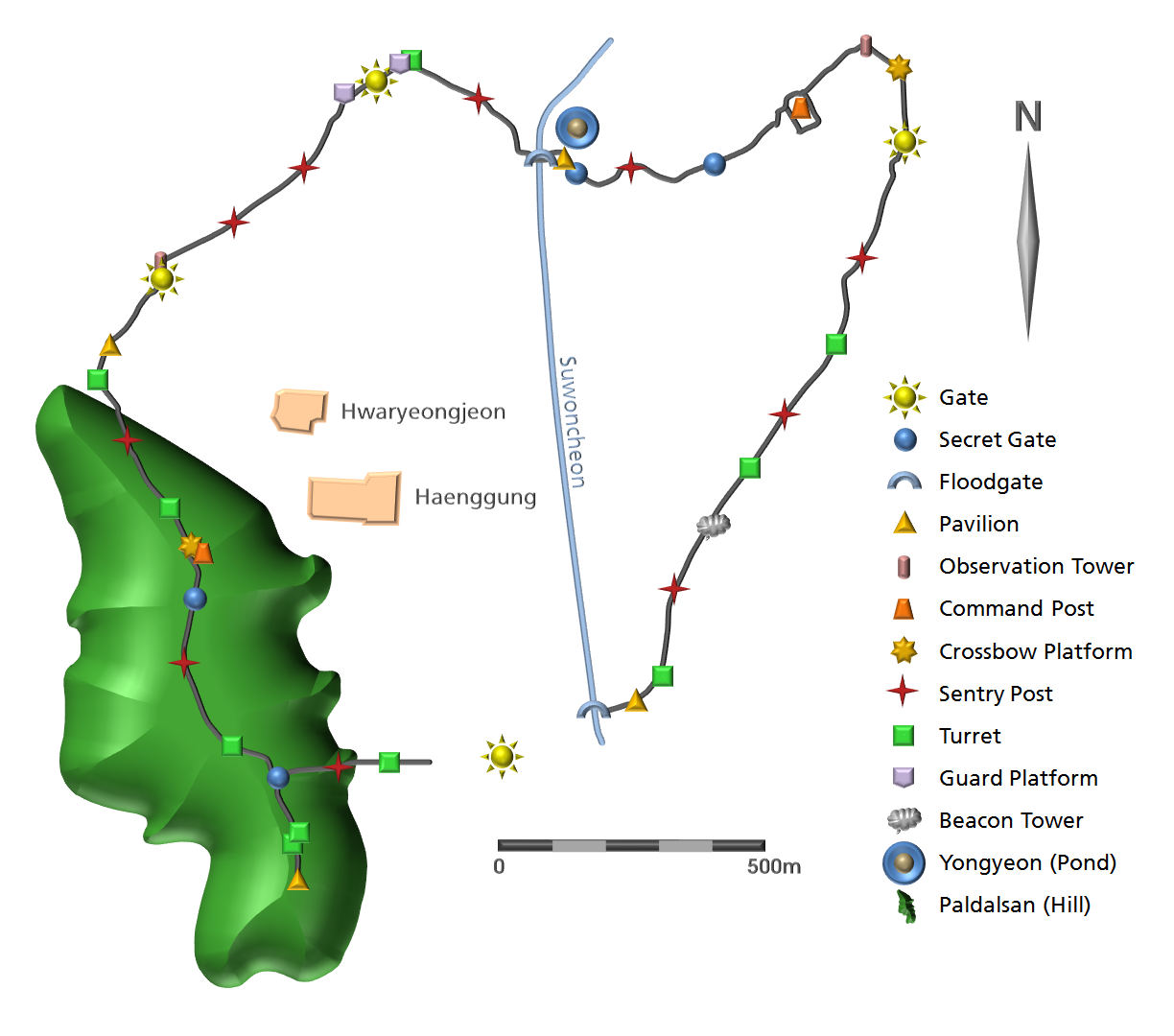
Map of the fortress

Hwaseong Fortress was built over a two-and-a-half-year period, from 1794 to 1796 according to the designs of the architect Chŏng Yagyong, who would later become a renowned leader of the Silhak movement. Silhak, which means practical learning, encouraged the use of science and industry, and Chŏng incorporated fortress designs from Korea and China along with contemporary science into his plans. The use of brick as a building material for the fortress and employment of efficient pulleys and cranes were also due to the influence of Silhak.

Construction of the fortress was also a response to the collapse of the Korean front line during the Imjin war. At the time, the dominant model for building fortresses in Korea was to make a simple wall for the city or town and a separate mountain fortress to which the people could evacuate in times of war. However, this fortress was built to include elements of a wall, defensive fortress, and town centre, the four main gates being used as the gates for the town. The arrow-launching platforms built along ramparts with crenellated parapets and battlements were defensive elements of the fortress while the wall also included secret gates for offensive actions.

The fortress took 700,000 person-hours to build and cost the national treasury 870,000 nyang, the currency at the time, and 1500 sacks of rice to pay the workers. In the past, government work had been carried out by corvée labour, but in this case workers were paid by the government, another sign of Silhak influence.

== Records of Hwaseong Fortress Construction ==
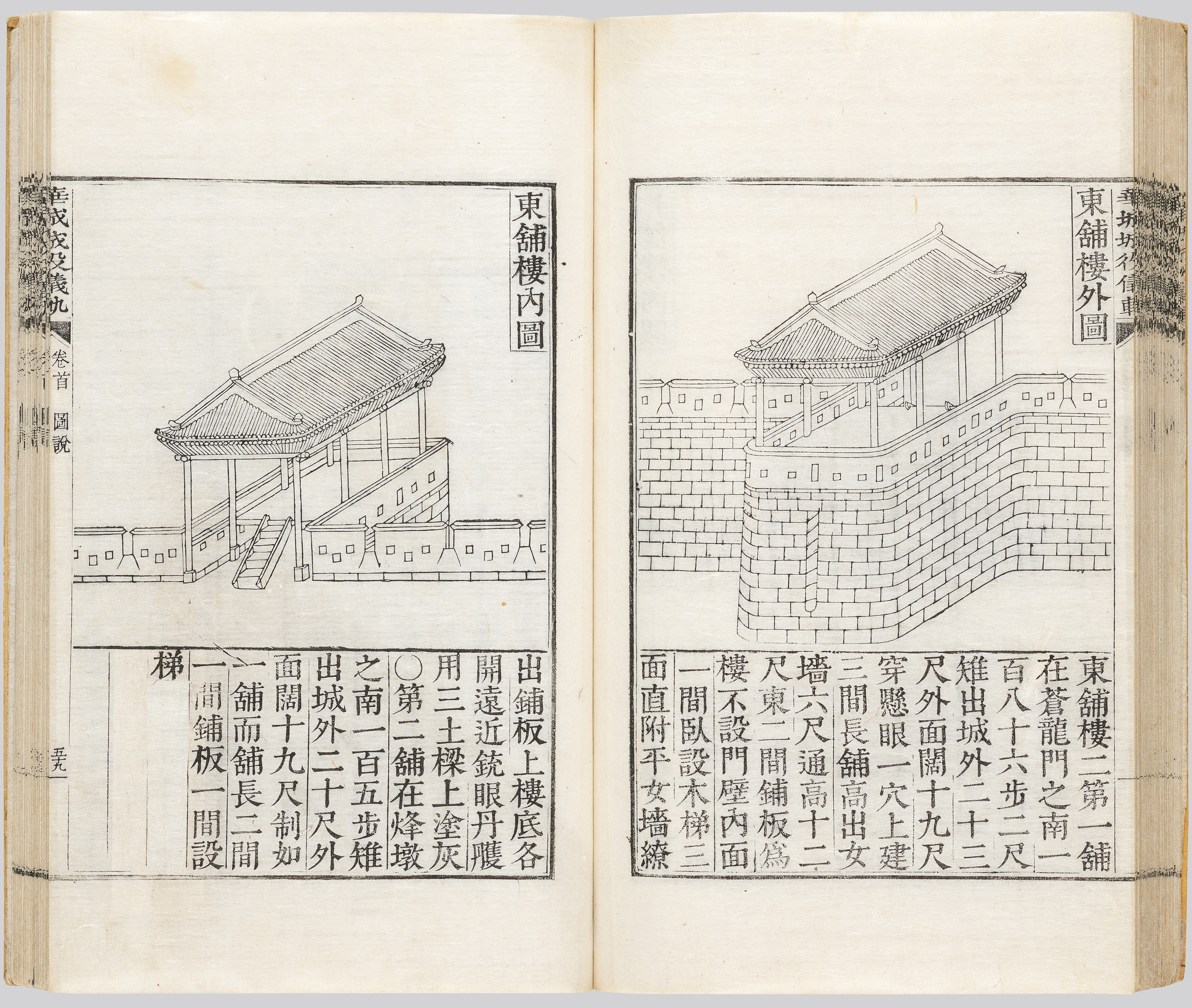
Hwaseong seongyeok uigwe

A white paper, Hwaseong Seongyeok Uigwe (Records of Hwaseong Fortress Construction), was published in 1801, shortly after the death of King Jeongjo. It has ten volumes and proved invaluable for the reconstruction effort in 1970 after the fortress had been severely damaged during the Korean War. The volumes were divided by subject, with the first covering the plans for building, including blueprints and a list of supervisors. The next six volumes detail the actual implementation of the construction, such as the royal orders and records of the wages of the workers. The final three volumes are supplements and detail the construction of the adjoining palace, Haenggung. Labour was allocated by speciality, dividing workers by trade, categorising them as foremen, stonemasons, labourers, and so on. The records also detail the quantities of different materials used.

An abridged French translation was published in 1898 by Henry Chevalier, who was consul of France in Korea, while a full German translation with commentary is provided in a thesis by Doo Won Cho of the University of Bamberg.

Drawings of Hwaseong, published 1801

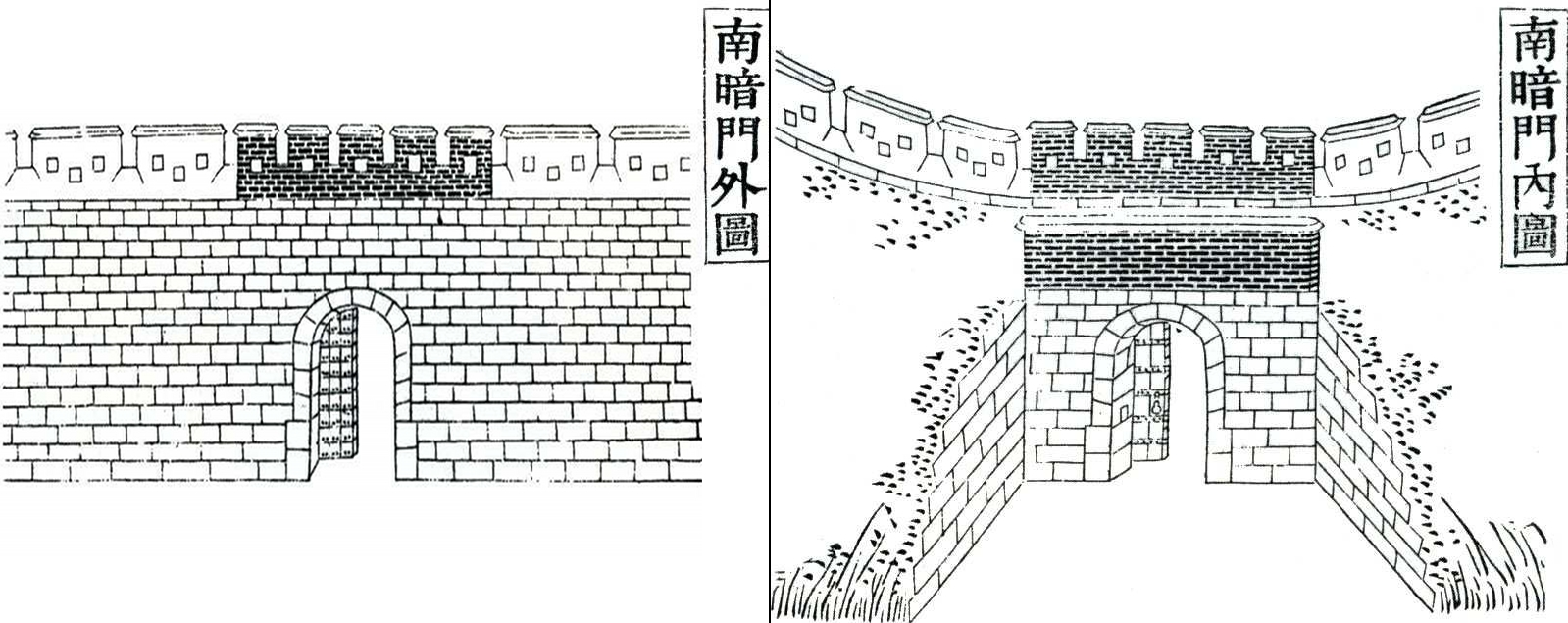
South Secret Gate

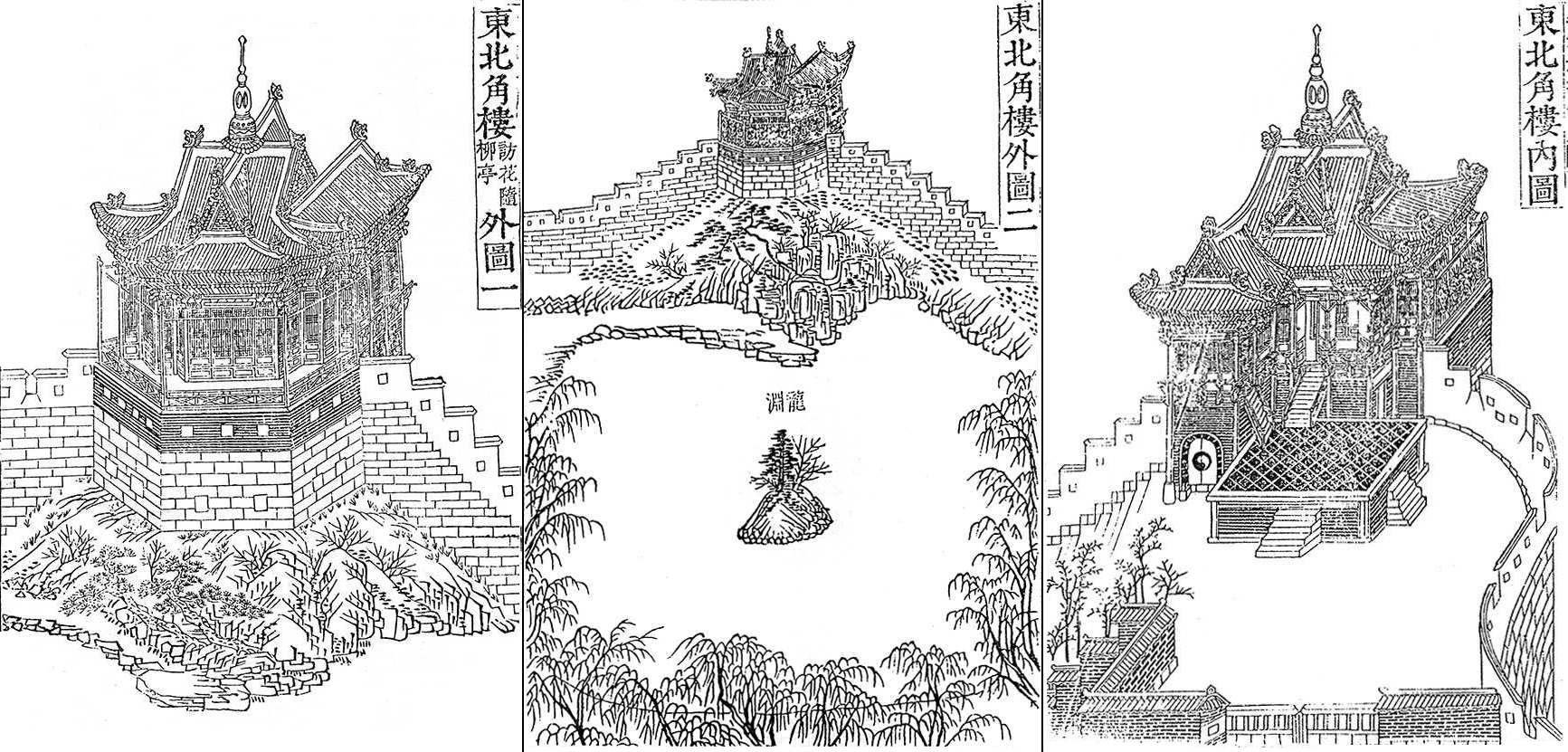
N-E Pavillon and Pond

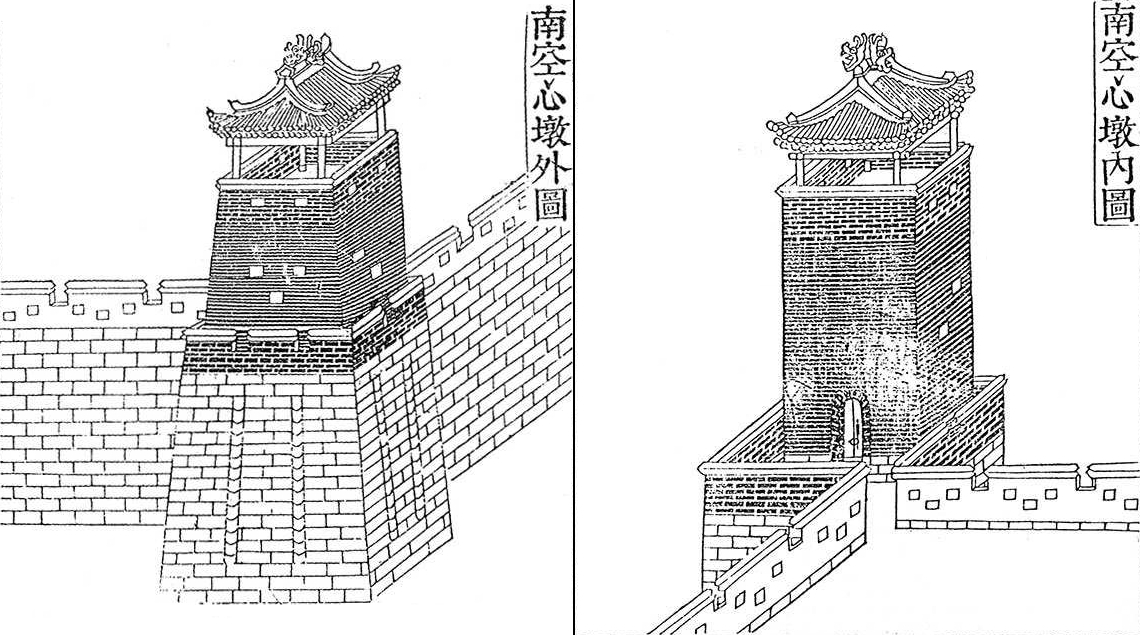
S. Observation Tower

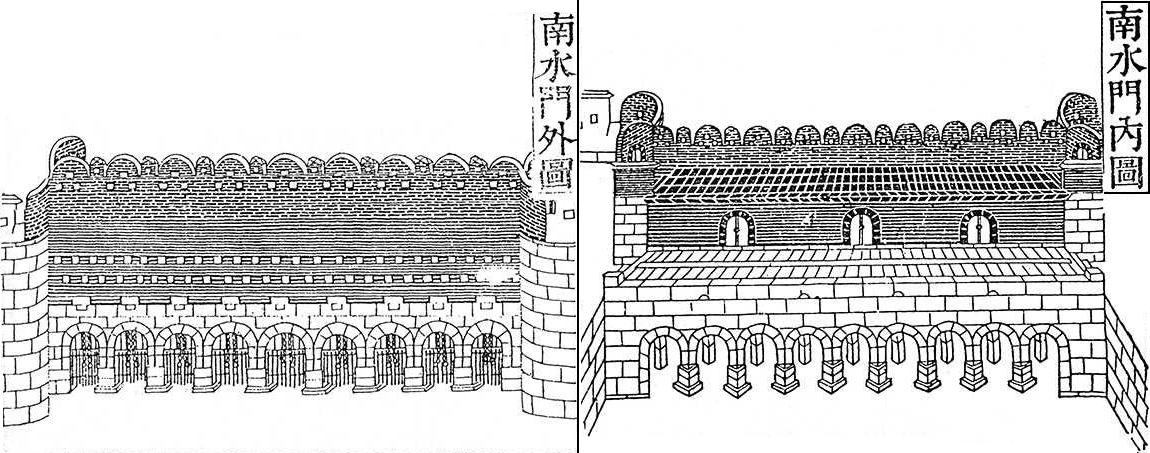
South Flood Gate

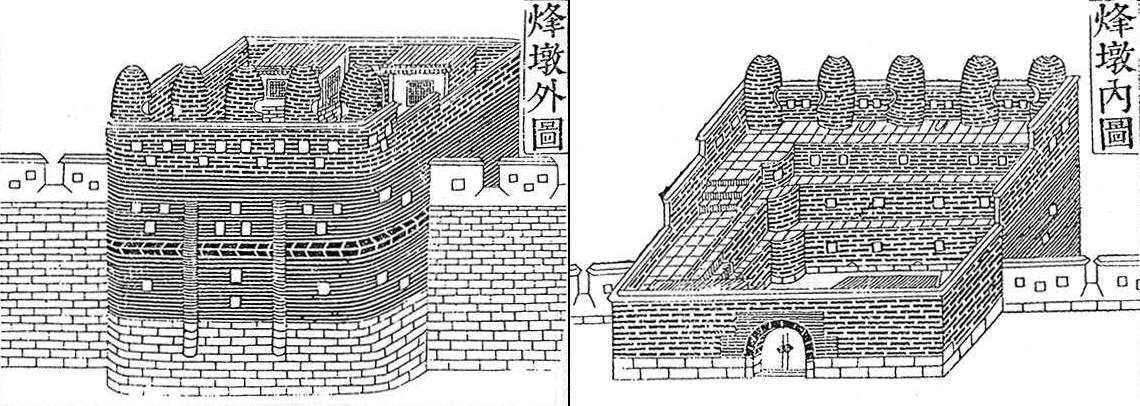
Beacon

== Overview of structures ==
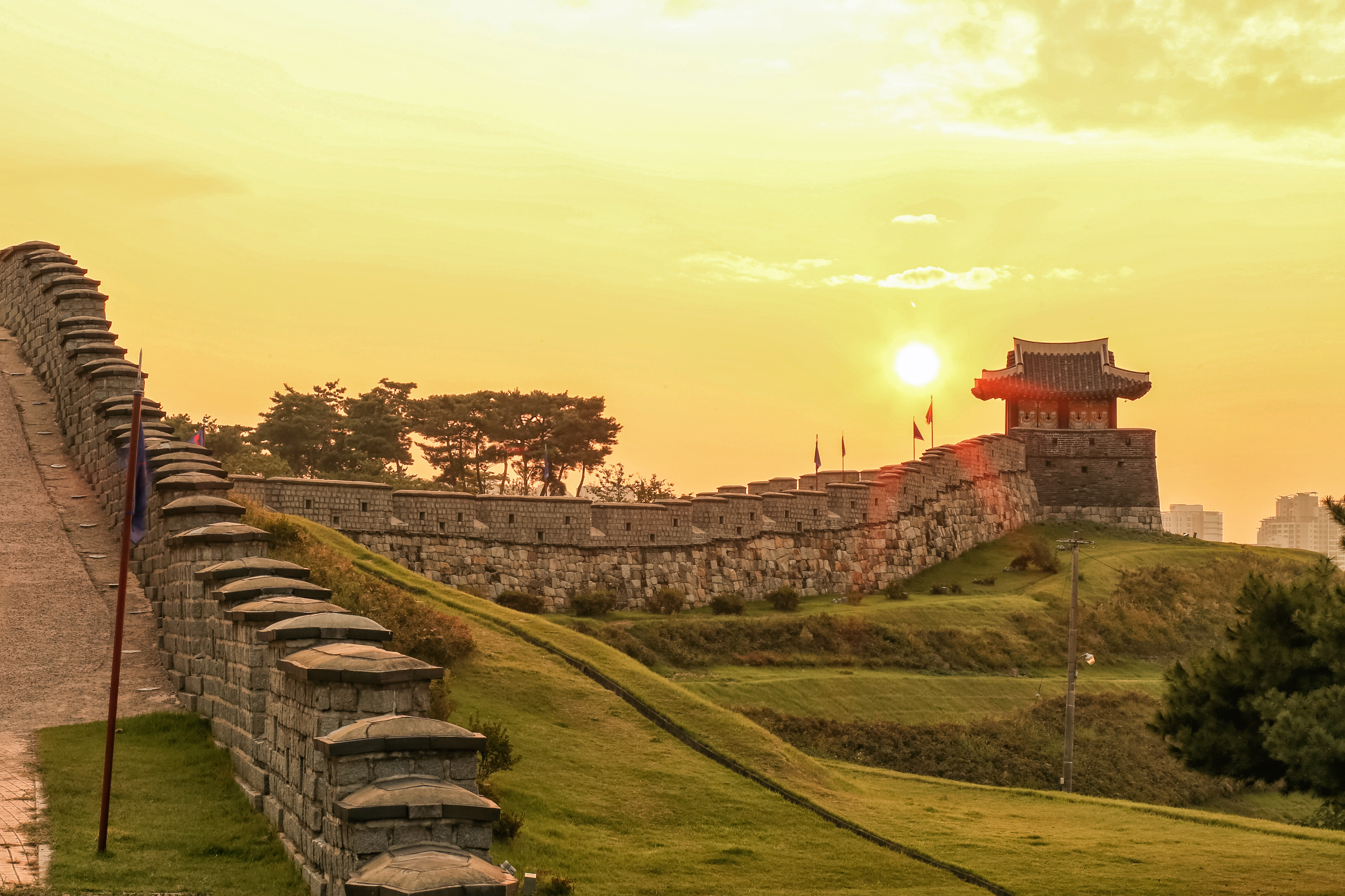
The wall of Hwaseong Fortress

=== Wall ===
The wall is 5.74 kilometres (3.57 mi) in length and varies between 4 and 6 metres (13–20 ft), originally enclosing 1.3 square kilometres (0.5 sq mi) of land. On flat terrain the wall was generally built higher than that on either of the two hills over which it passes, as higher walls were seen as less necessary along hilltops. The parapets are made of stone and brick, like most of the fortress, and were 1.2 metres (4 ft) in height. All parts are well-maintained, and the whole circuit can be walked easily.

=== The Four Main Gates ===
The 1795 fortress had four gates: Janganmun (north gate), Hwaseomun (west), Paldalmun (south) and Changnyongmun (east). Janganmun and Paldalmun are the largest of the four main gates and resemble Seoul's Namdaemun in roof design, stone and woodwork. Indeed, Janganmun is the largest gate in Korea. Both the north and south gates are topped with two-storey wooden pavilions, while Hwaseomun's and Changyongmun's, those of the west and east gates respectively, have only one storey. The four main gates are encircled by miniature fortresses which were manned by guards. Meanwhile, Changyoungmun was greatly destroyed during the Korean War and it was restored in 1978.

=== The Modern Days Entries ===
Nowadays, the intra muros Suwon requires large entries for the modern roads needed by visitors and inhabitants. These large roads were built during the period when the wall was down, and the 1975 reconstruction had no choice but to preserve these roads. For three of them, the rampart walk has been rebuilt as a bridge between two neighboring structures:

- The North Entry by a bridge between the North Gate Janganmun and its Eastern Gate Guard Platform.
- The East Entry by a bridge between the North-East Crossbow Platform and the North-East Observation Tower
- The West Entry by a bridge between the West Gate and the North-West Pavilion. Additionally, two small underpass related to Mount Paldal were preserved. They are situated respectively near the West Turret 1 and the South Turret.

Concerning the South Entry, i.e. the biggest one, a more radical solution has been used. Four no more extant structures (the South-West and South-East Gate Guard Platforms, the South Secret Gate and the South Observation Tower) were not rebuild at all and now the South Gate, Paldalmun, remains isolated from everything, like an island in a flood of traffic.

=== Other structures ===
Among all the structures along the wall (see descriptions below), the most striking are

- the floodgates
- the remaining two watchtowers, both three-storey and with distinctive wooden pavilions on top and embrasures for guns and lookouts.
- the beacon tower. It has five chimneys to make different signals with smoke or fire. When one was lit it signaled peace, two meant the enemy had been spotted, three warned that the enemy was approaching, four meant the enemy had made it into the city, and five signals lit was an alert that fighting had begun.

=== Poru 砲樓 versus Poru 鋪樓 ===
For an unknown reason, the original Chinese terms 砲樓 (pào lóu, "fortified tower, blockhouse") and 鋪樓 (pù lóu, "platform") have been alphabetized by the same Hangul 포루, generating several naming collisions. In accordance with the authoritative Hwaseong Seongyeok Uigwe (1801), it is convenient to maintain different names for different kinds of fortification structures. This leads to alphabetize 砲樓 as 'GunTower' and 鋪樓 as 'SentryPost'. The following gallery shows how different these structures are in their design and their usefulness.

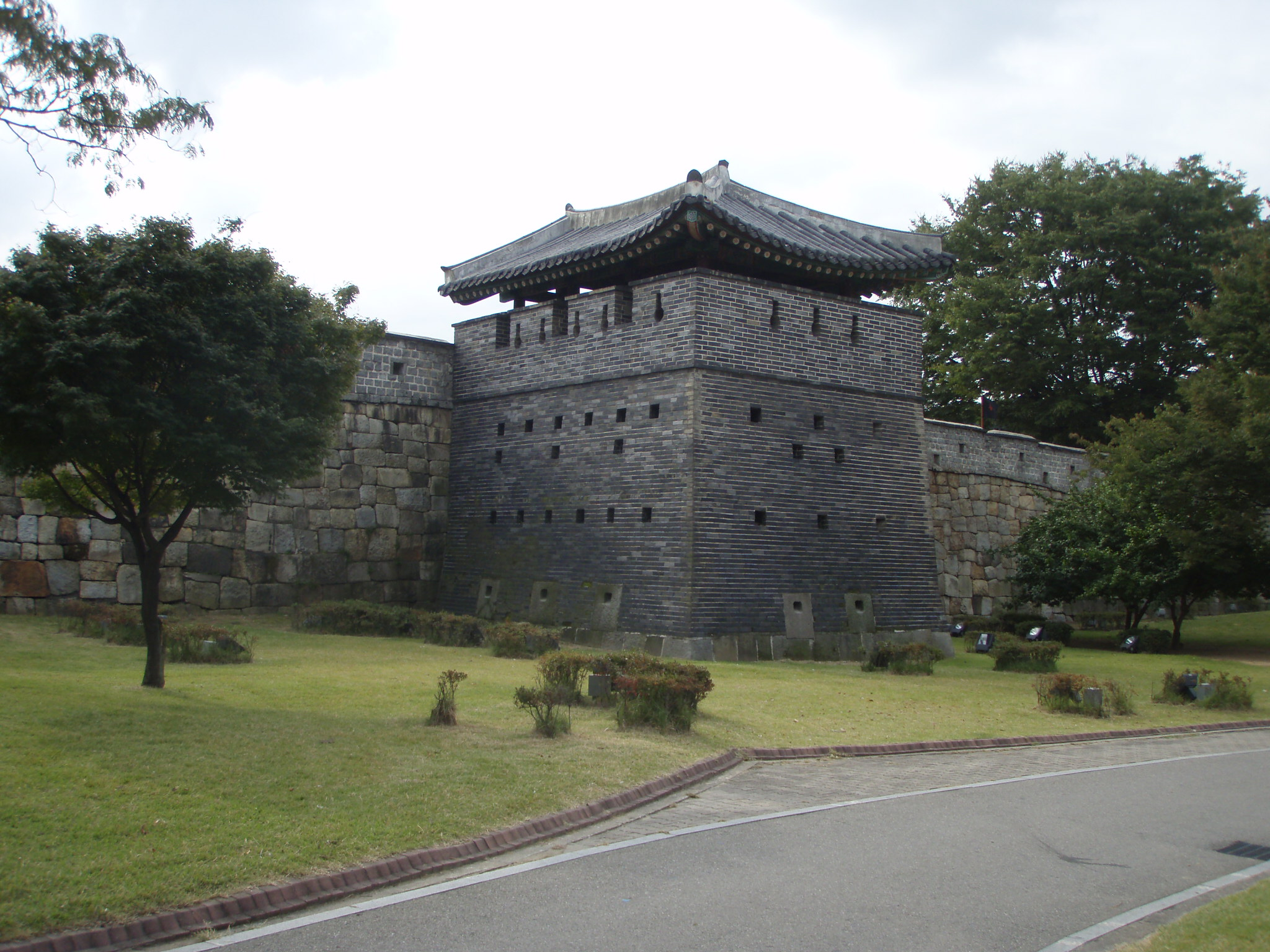
north-west:
Bukseo-GunTower
北西砲樓
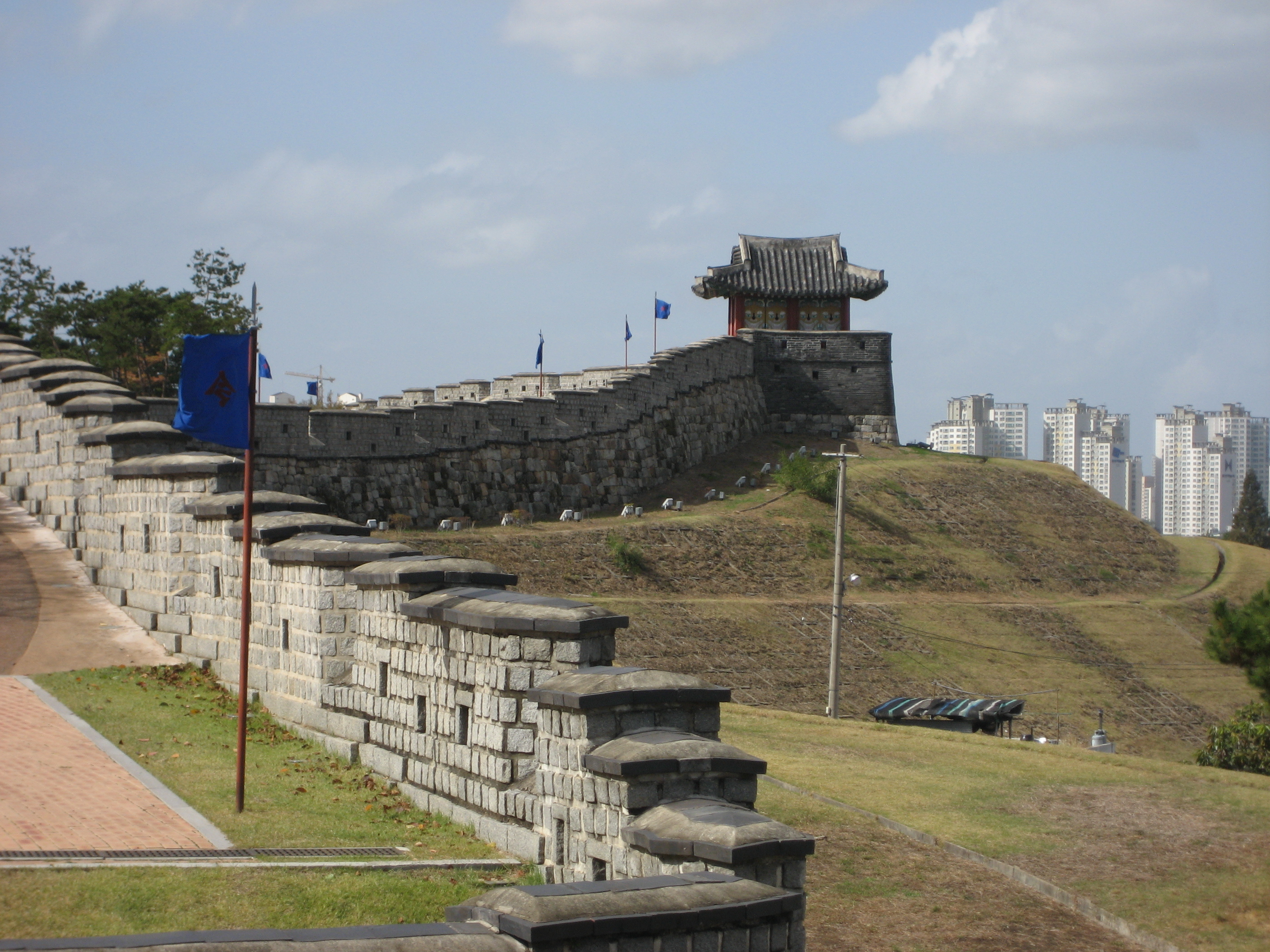
east-north:
Dongbuk-SentryPost
東北鋪樓

== Features of the Wall ==
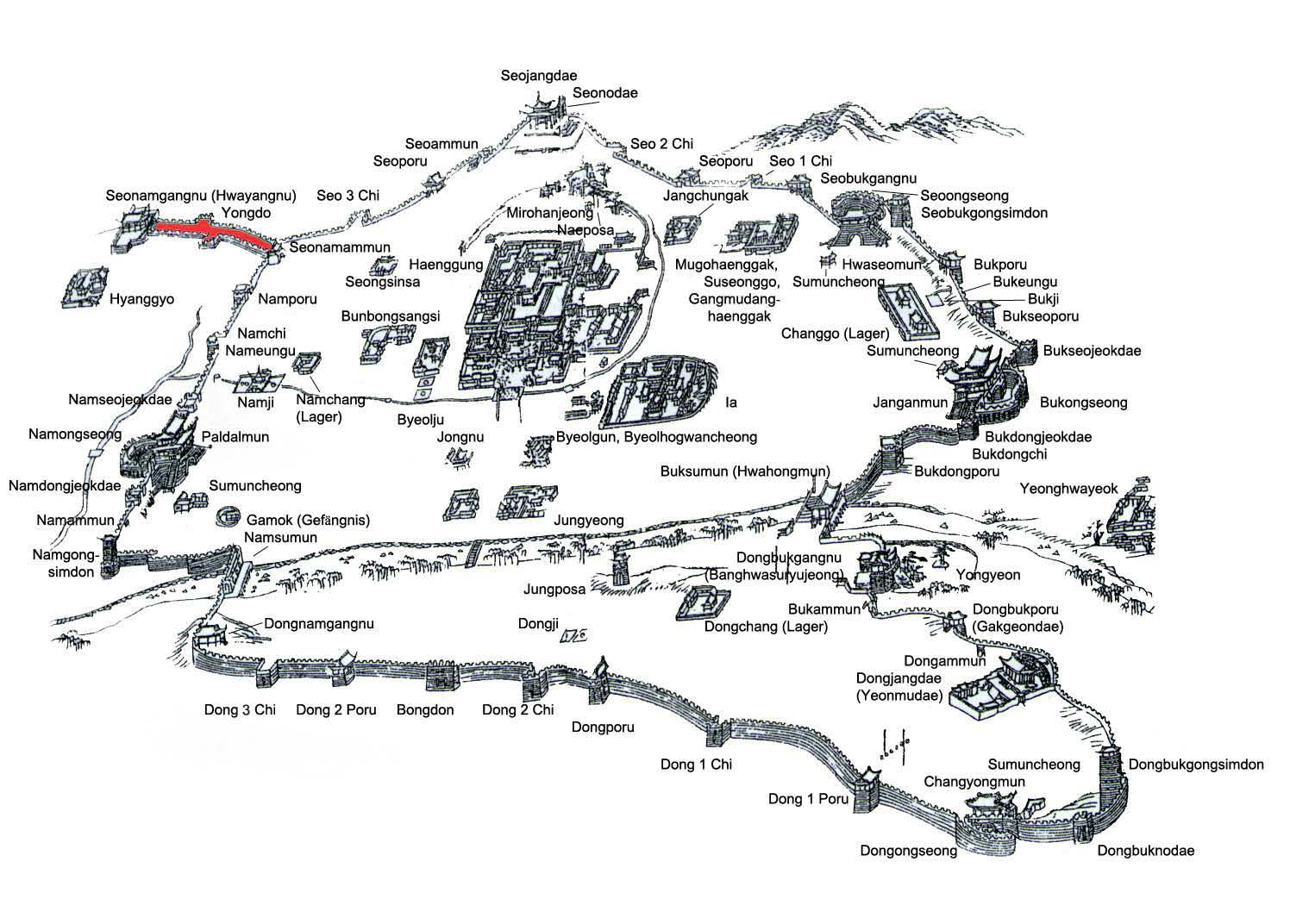
A depiction of Hwaseong Fortress, published in the Hwaseong Seongyeok Uigwe (1801)

There were 48 structures, including those no longer existing, situated along the wall and which can be sorted by their relative usefulness:

- Main Gates (4): South, East, North, West
- Flood gates (2): South, North
- Beacon (1): Beacon Tower
- Spur (1): South-West Spur (용도)
- Command Posts (2): East, West
- Pavillons (4): South-East, North-East, North-West, South-West
- Guard Platforms (4): South-East, North-East, North-West, South-West
- Secret Gates (5): South, East, North, West, South-West
- Observation Towers (3): South, North-East, North-West
- Sentry Posts (5): East No. 2, East No. 1, North-East, North, West
- GunTowers (5): East, North-East, North-West, West, South
- Crossbow Platforms (2): North-East, West
- Turrets (10): East No. 3, East No. 2, East No. 1, North-East, West No. 1, West No. 2, West No. 3, South-West No. 1, South-West No. 2, South

Four of the original structures were not reconstructed; these were the South-East Gate Guard Platform, the South Secret Gate, the South Observation Tower, and the South Floodgate. All four structures were all situated immediately near the South Gate and the presence of the modern roads required for visitors and inhabitants in the area inhibited their reconstruction.

The structures of the wall can also be listed in the order they appear by walking the length of the wall, beginning with the South Gate. or the "Asian Historical Architecture". Here, these structures are listed in anti-clockwise order beginning by the South Gate (the access node using public transportation).

1. South Gate (팔달문)
2. South-East Gate Guard Platform (남동적대)
3. South Secret Gate (남암문)
4. South Observation Tower (남공심돈)
5. Namsumun (남수문)
6. South-East Pavilion (동남각루)
7. East Turret No. 3 (동삼치)
8. East Sentry Post No. 2 (동이포루)
9. Beacon Tower (봉돈)
10. East Turret No. 2 (동이치)
11. East GunTower (동포루)
12. East Turret No. 1 (동일치)
13. East Sentry Post 1 (동일포루)
14. East Gate (창룡문)
15. North-East Crossbow Platform (동북노대)
16. North-East Observation Tower (동북공심돈)
17. East Command Post (동장대)
18. East Secret Gate (동암문)
19. East-North Sentry Post (동북포루)
20. North Secret Gate (북암문)
21. North-East Pavilion (동북각루)
22. Hwahongmun (화홍문)
23. North-East GunTower (북동포루)
24. North-East Turret (북동치)
25. North-East Gate Guard Platform (북동적대)
26. North Gate (장안문)
27. North-West Gate Guard Platform (북서적대)
28. North-West GunTower (북서포루)
29. North Sentry Post (북포루)
30. North-West Observation Tower (서북공심돈)
31. West Gate (화서문)
32. North-West Pavilion (서북각루)
33. West Turret No. 1 (서일치)
34. West GunTower (서포루)
35. West Turret No. 2 (서이치)
36. West Crossbow Platform (서노대)
37. West Command Post (서장대)
38. West Secret Gate (서암문)
39. West Sentry Post (서포루)
40. West Turret No. 3 (서삼치)
41. South-West Secret Gate (서남암문)
42. South-West Spur (용도)
43. South-West Turret No. 1 (용도서치)
44. South-West Pavilion (서남각루)
45. South-West Turret No. 2 (용도동치)
46. South GunTower (남포루)
47. South Turret (남치)
48. South-West Gate Guard Platform (남서적대)

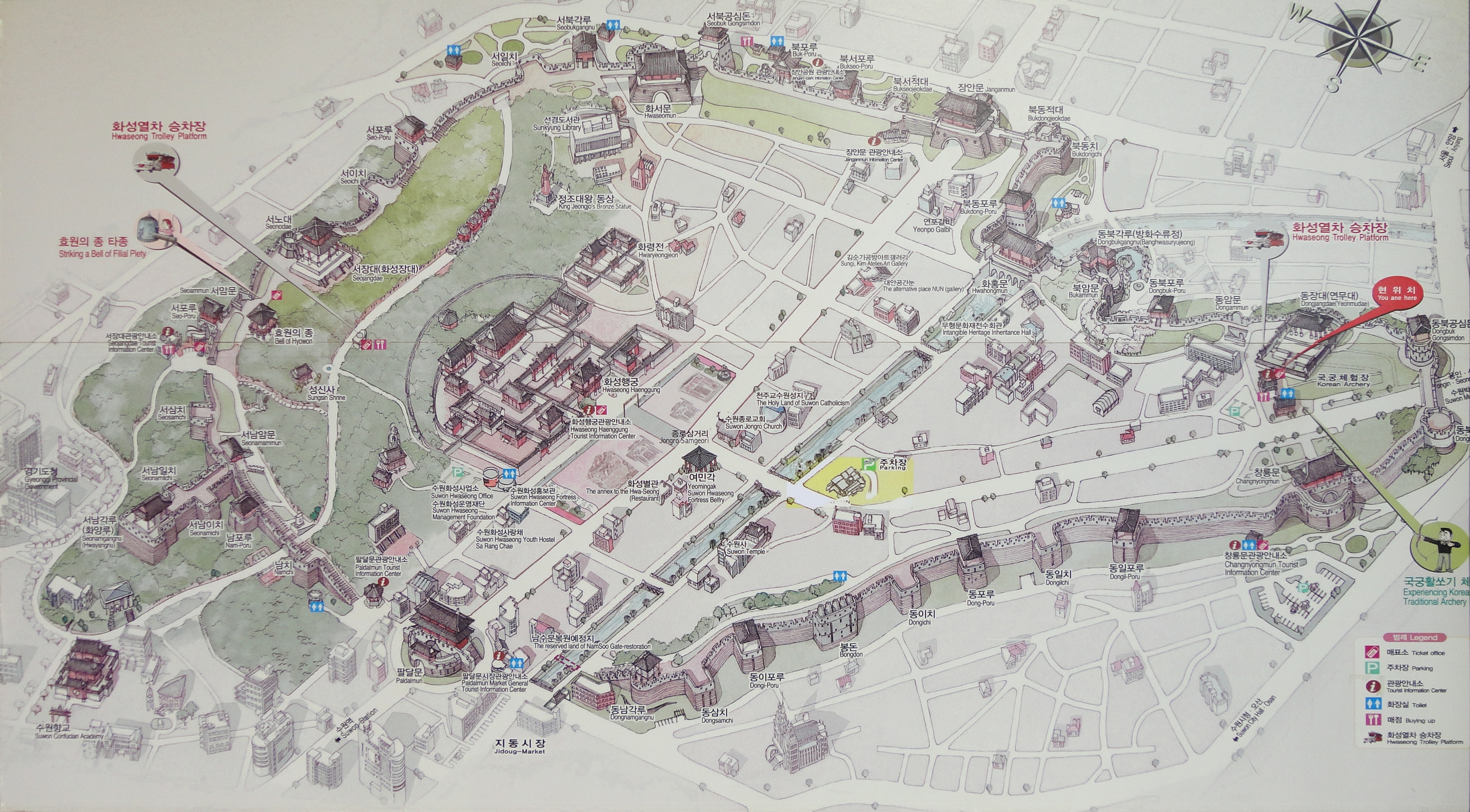
Another Sketch of the Hwaseong Fortress (before rebuilding of Namsumun)

=== South Gate (팔달문) ===
37°16′39″N 127°01′01″E
Paldalmun, known locally as Nammun (South Gate), sits in the middle of a roundabout on a busy main road in central Suwon. Its stone base is capped with a two-storey wooden pavilion surrounded by a stone wall. A small, semi-circular protective wall known as an ongseong, is located on the south side (outside) of the gate. The gate also houses a bell called Paldalmun Dongjong, which was originally cast in Gaeseong in 1080 and was refounded in 1687 by Dohwaseung, the chief priest of Manuisa Temple, for use in Buddhist ceremonies. Standing 123 cm tall and 75 cm in diameter, it hangs from a dragon-shaped suspension ring, has a flue pipe to set the tone and has a slightly curved body - features which are typical of Korean bells of that era. This particular bell's flue pipe has a design of the dragon's tail entwined around it and is topped with a lotus flower. The top of the bell has a line of Sanskrit words around it, while the bottom is decorated with arabesque designs. The decorative nipples are interspaced with Bodisattvas holding lotus flowers. The bell is very similar in design to that in Tongdosa, which differs notably from Paldalmun's only in size.

Paldalmun was not damaged during the Korean War, so has not undergone the same extensive rebuild as other structures around the wall. As a result, there has been extensive sagging in some beams, so, beginning in September 2010, a full dismantling, repair and reassembling of the gate's roof is being undertaken.

South Gate (Paldalmun)

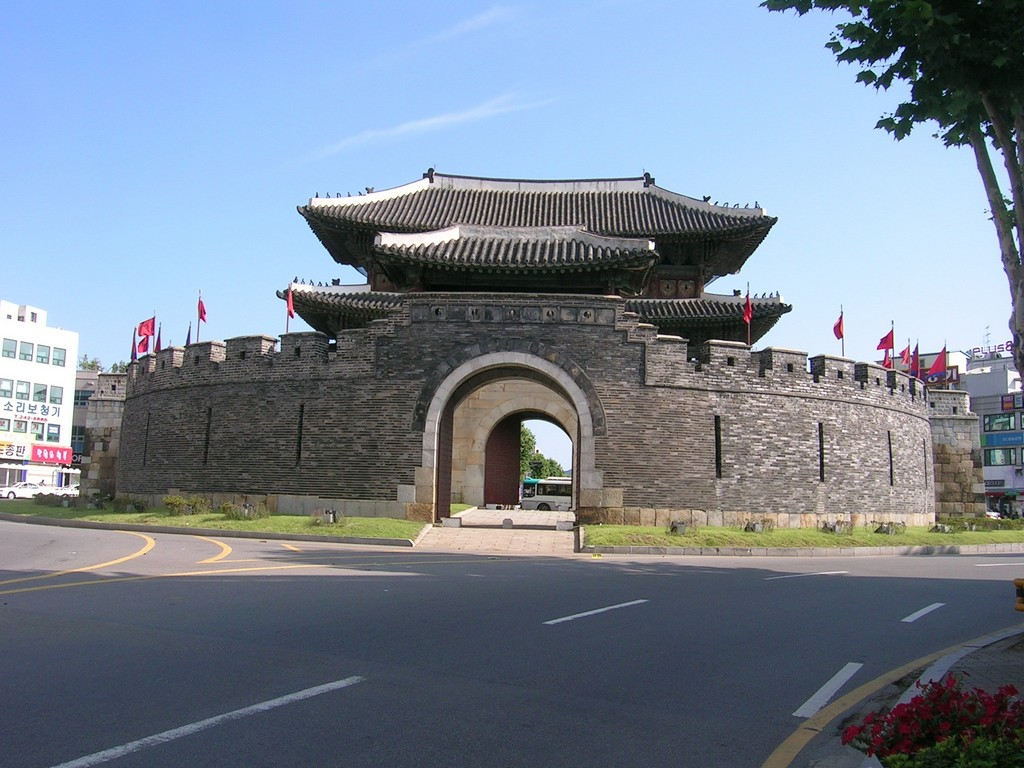
South face and ongseong seen without traffic

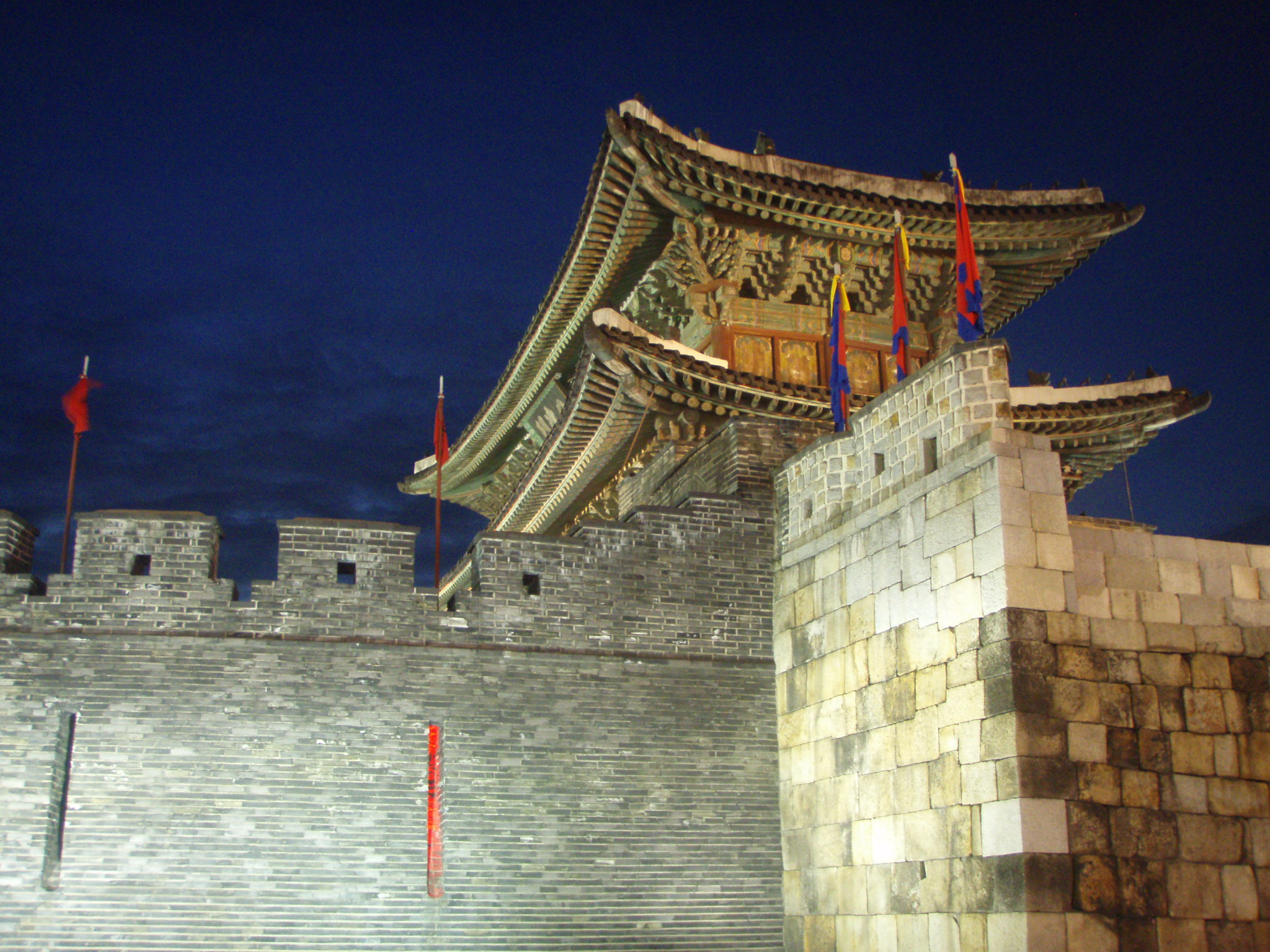
East face in the evening

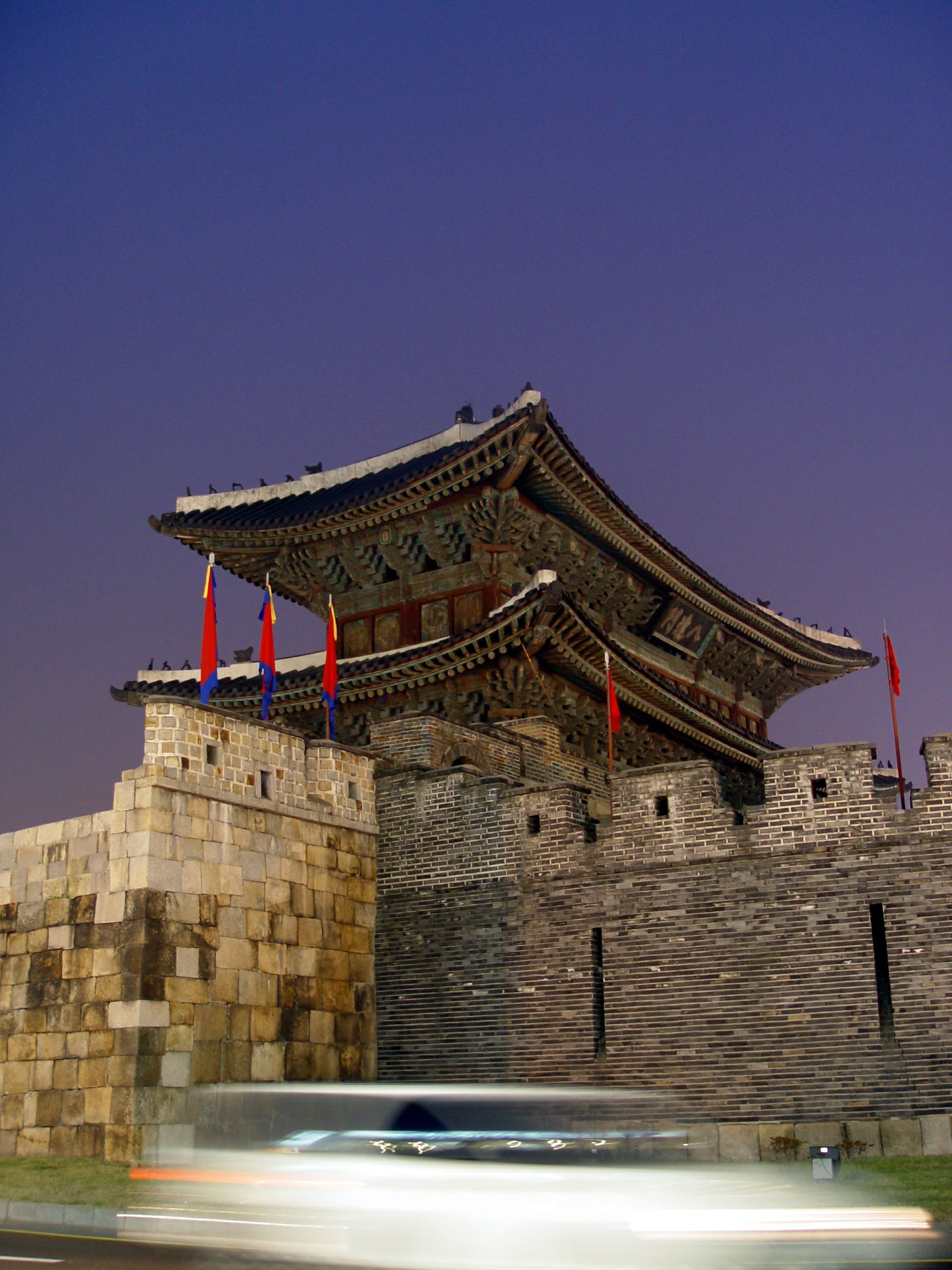
West face at dusk

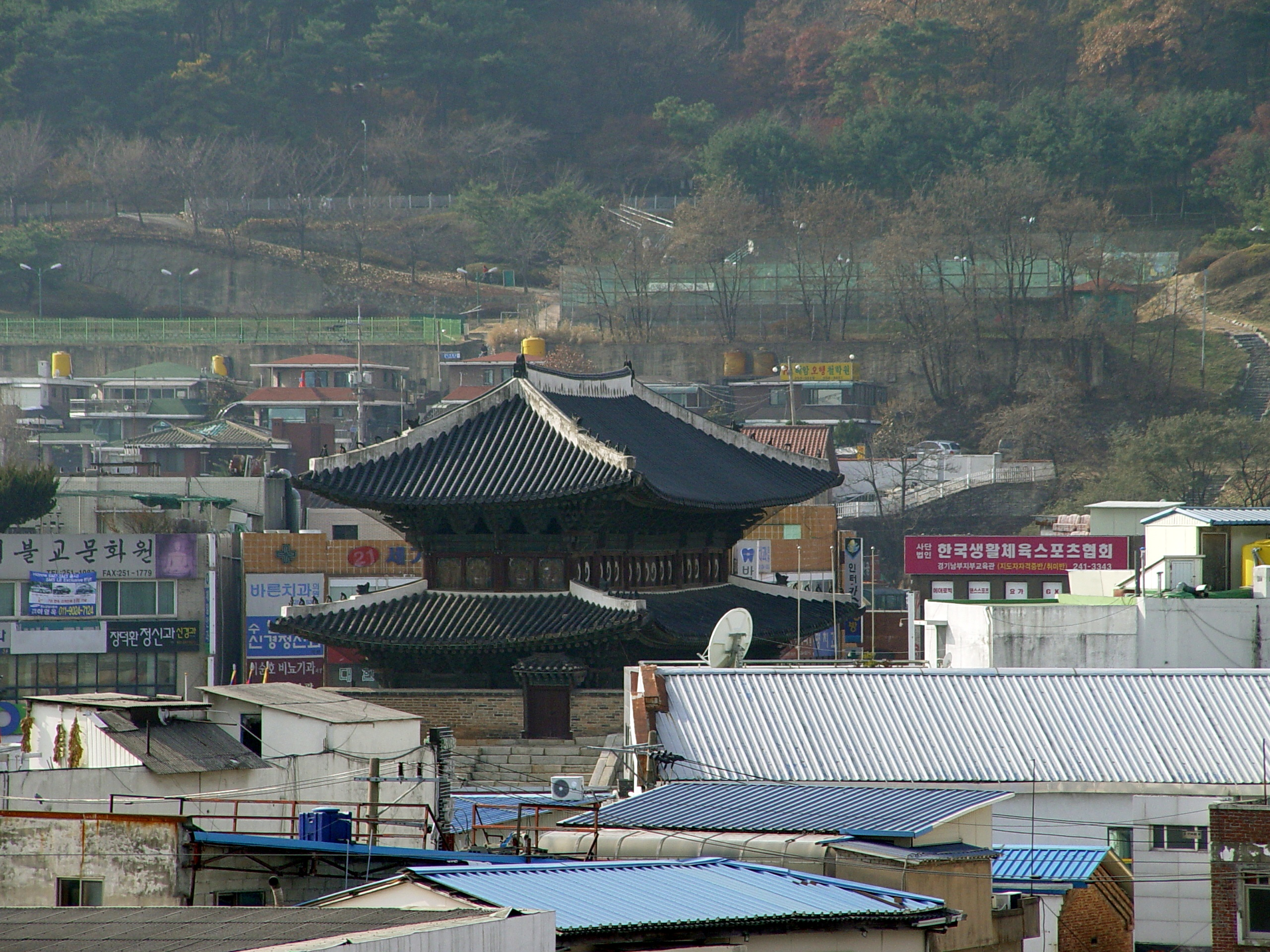
Seen across rooftops from Dongnam Gangnu

=== Missing Structures ===
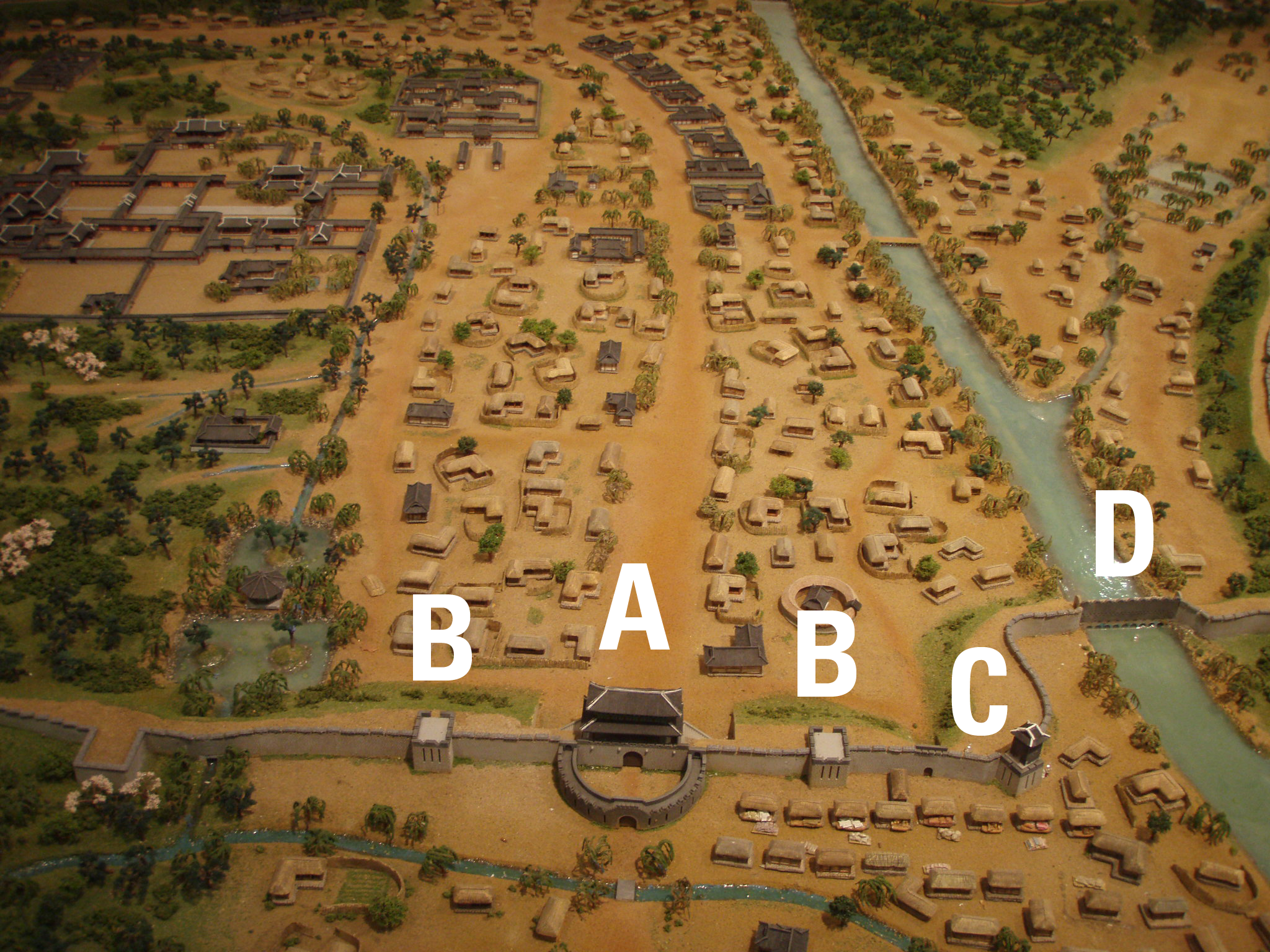
The location of the South Gate (A) with the missing structures of Hwaseong; B:South-East Gate Guard Platforms; C:South Observation Tower; D:South Floodgate

Four structures of the original Hwaseong Fortress were not reconstructed but are known from the Uigwe. The first two of these were the South-East Gate Guard Platform (남동적대) and the South-West Gate Guard Platform (남서적대), originally located at both sides of the South Gate. The South Secret Gate (남암문) allowed sallies out of the fortress. The Domgnam Gongsimdon, or the South Observation Tower (남공심돈), like that which stands by Hwaseomun, was an observation tower beside the Suwoncheon.

Missing structures of Hwaseong Fortress

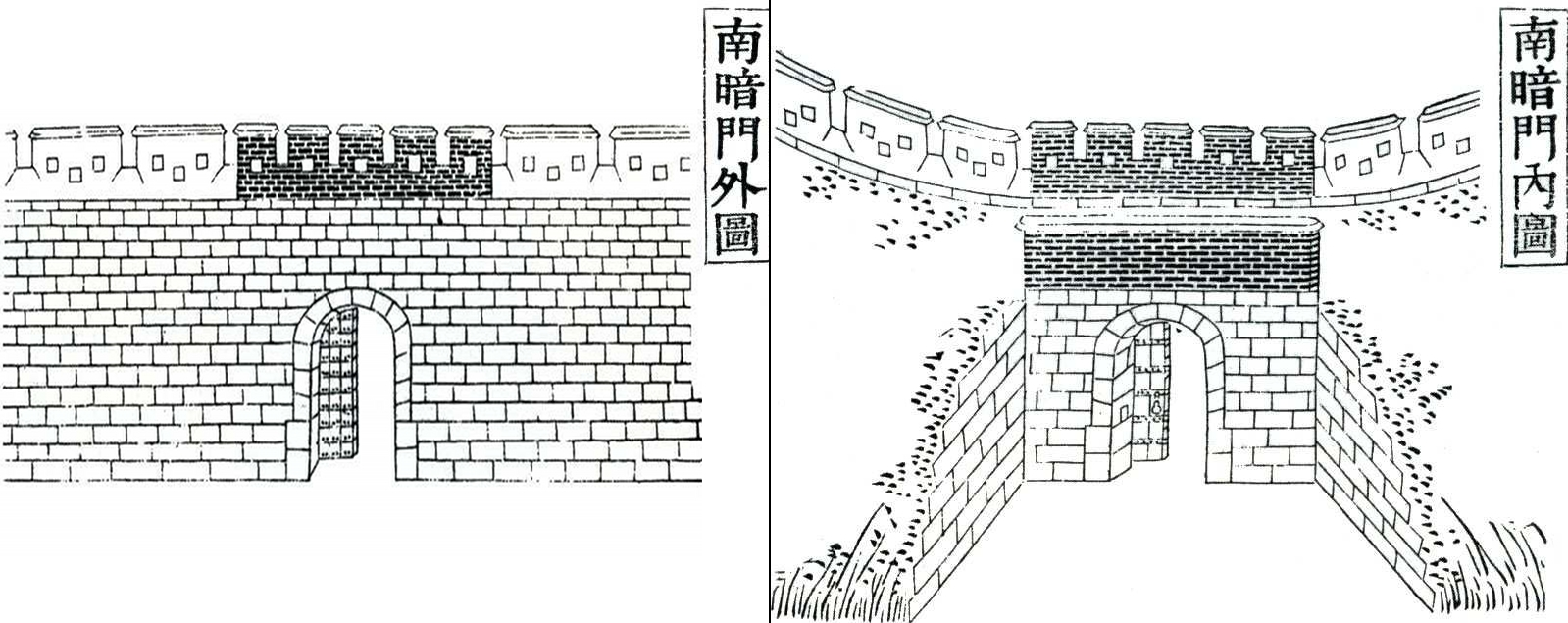
South Secret Gate

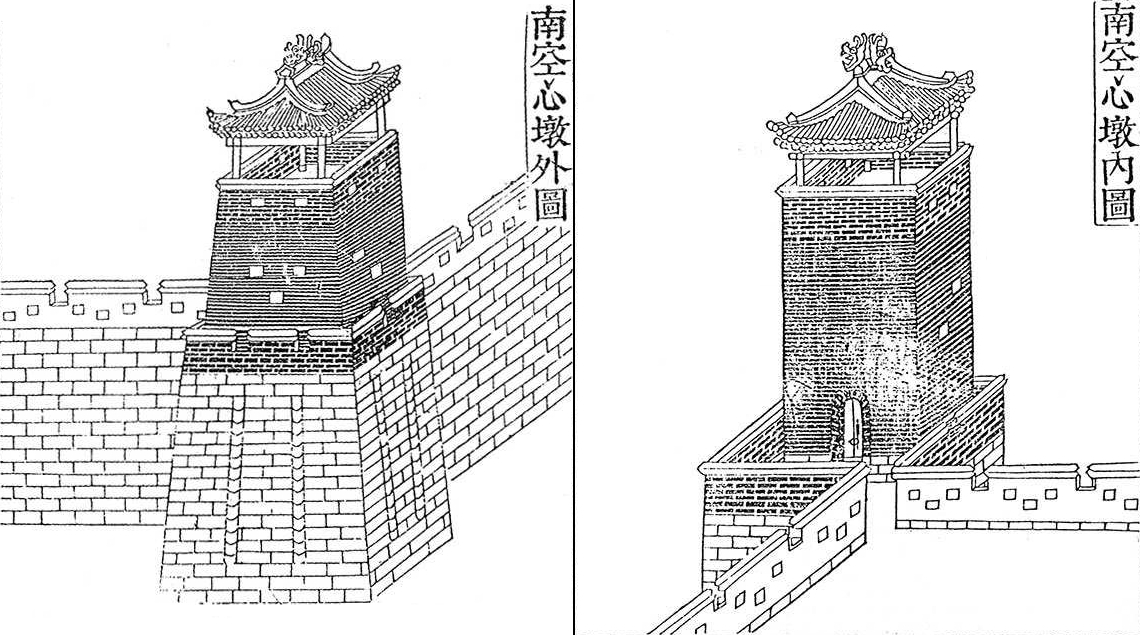
South Observation Tower

=== Namsumun (남수문) ===
Extending across the Suwoncheon at the southern part of the fortress is Namsumun (남수문), the South Floodgate. Located a little over a kilometer downstream from its sister, Hwahongmun, the gate is 29.4m long, 5.9m wide and 9.3m high. Construction of the original began on February 28, 1794, was interrupted, then continued in November 1795, and ultimately was completed on March 25, 1796, though the gates basic structure was completed as early as January 16 and came into operation at that time. The bridge features nine arches for the water to flow underneath, two more than Hwahongmun because of the increase in water flow. This particular area was considered a weak point in the fortress' defenses, and thus a large brick structure overlooking the stream was built above the bridge. A feature unique to Namsumun, this defensive structure comprises a whole two-thirds of the gate's total height above the arches, with the bridge accounting for the remaining one-third. Notably, Hwahongmun does not have a similar structure and is instead guarded by lower stone walls and a wooden gatehouse.

In 1846, the original Namsumun was swept away in a major flood. It was soon restored but washed away again by a flood in 1922, during the Japanese occupation. During the general restoration of Hwaseong Fortress in 1975, no consensus was obtained on how to rebuild the gate, and the area was left reserved for restoration at a later time. The issue arose again during the rehabilitation of the entire Suwon Stream, inside and outside the Fortress, that was initiated in 2006. Finally, in June 2010, reconstruction work began and was completed in 2012.

Namsumun

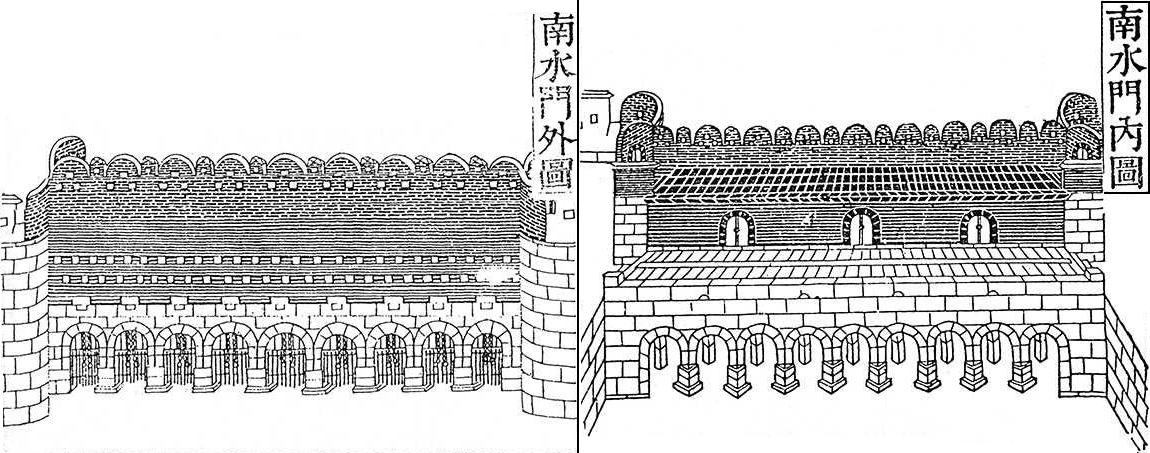
Namsumun

=== South-East Pavilion (동남각루) ===
37°16′42″N 127°01′11″E
Dongnam Gangnu, the south-eastern pavilion, sits on top of a small rise above Namsumun (the South Floodgate). Thanks to its elevated height, the pavilion serves as key lookout point, as much of Hwaseong and the area outside to the south and east can be seen from here.

South-East Pavilion

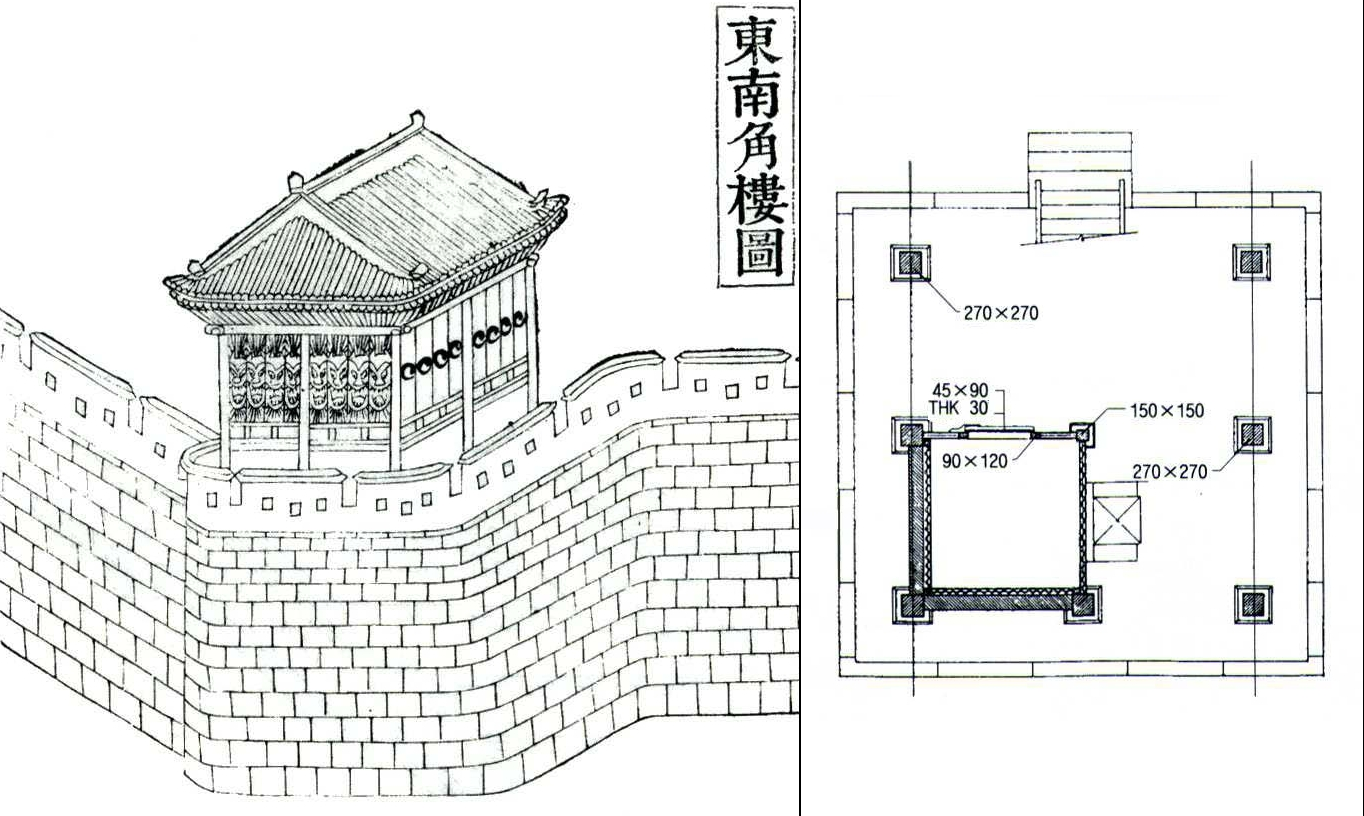
The South-East Pavilion as it appears in the Uigwe

=== East Turret No. 3 (동삼치) ===
37°16′44″N 127°01′13″E
Dongsam Chi, the third eastern turret, lies halfway from the south-east pavilion to the second eastern sentry post. Like other turrets, it extends a short distance perpendicularly from the wall to enable guards to see and attack assailants who had already reached the fortress.

East Turret No. 3

=== East Sentry Post No. 2 (동이포루) ===
37°16′49″N 127°01′14″E
Dong-i Poru, the second eastern sentry post, like other sentry posts, is a wooden structure sitting on a turret. Construction of this post was completed on July 3, 1796 and it was intended to defend the beacon tower. For this purpose, it extends further out from the wall than the north-western sentry post. It also lacks wooden front doors.

East Sentry Post No. 2

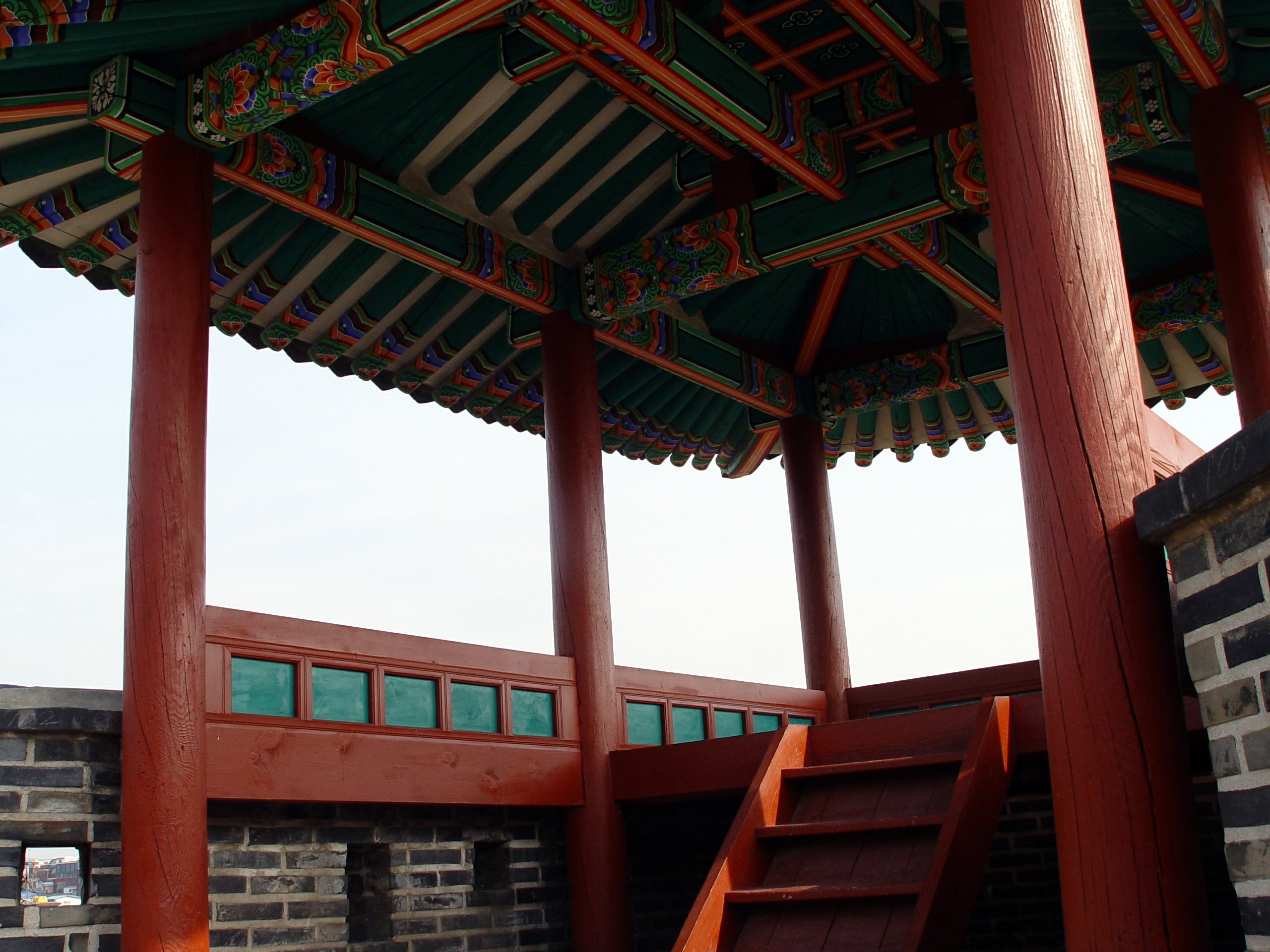
The steps

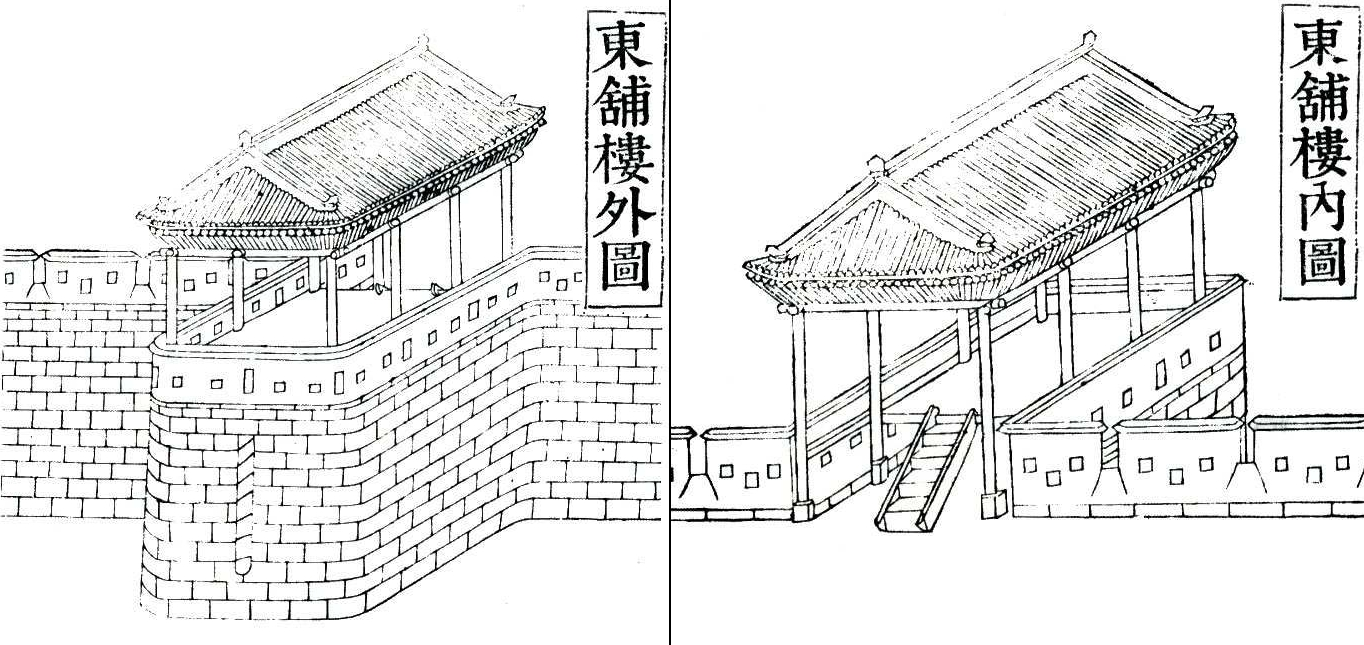
Uigwe picture

=== Beacon Tower (봉돈) ===
37°16′53″N 127°01′17″E
Bongdon, the beacon tower, sits midway from Paldalmun to Changnyongmun. It is located intentionally in direct line with Haenggung so that the king could see its signals. Smokes and lights were used to signal the state of threats. The southernmost of its five chimneys was used during peacetime.

Beacon Tower

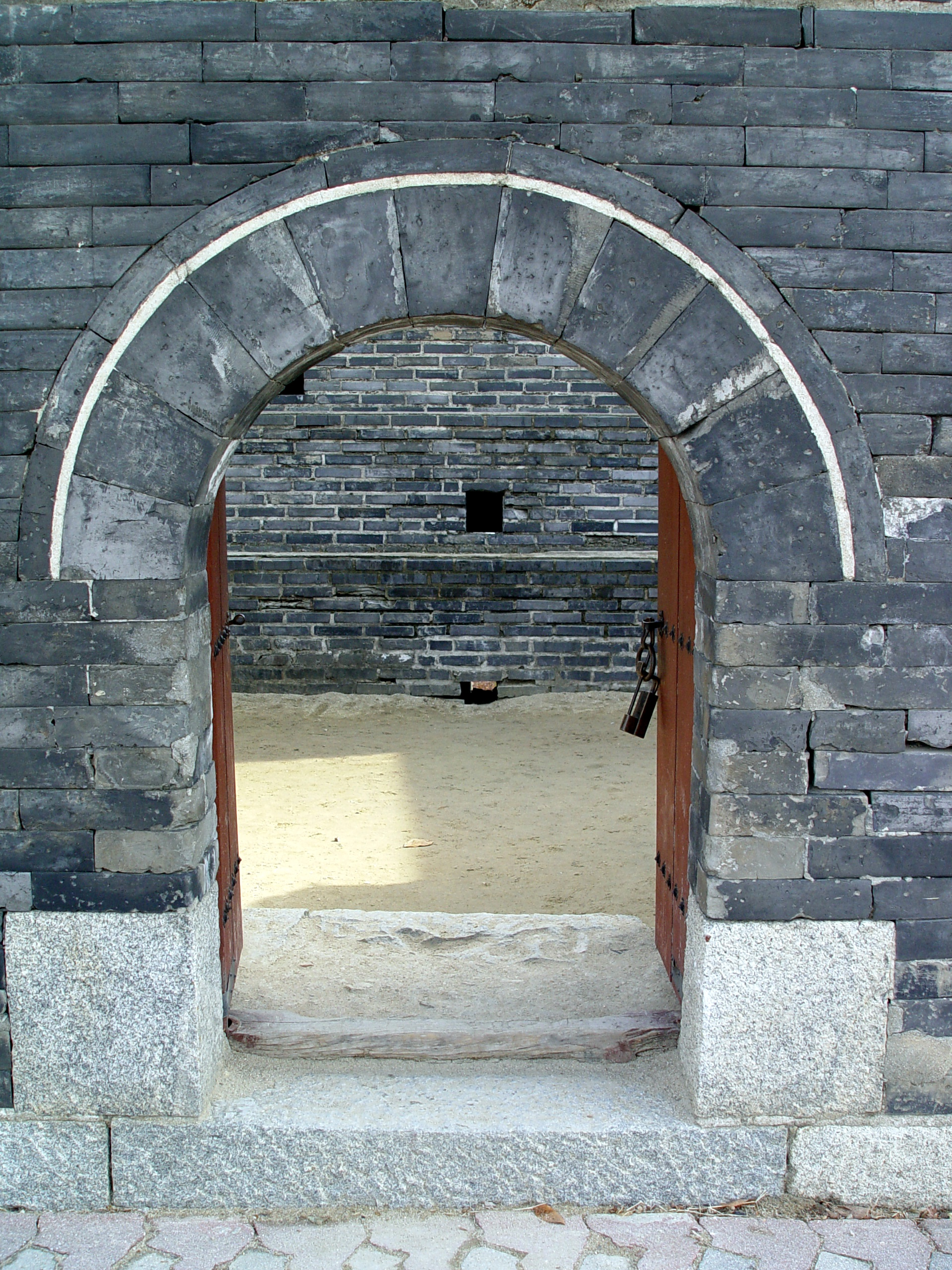
Doorway

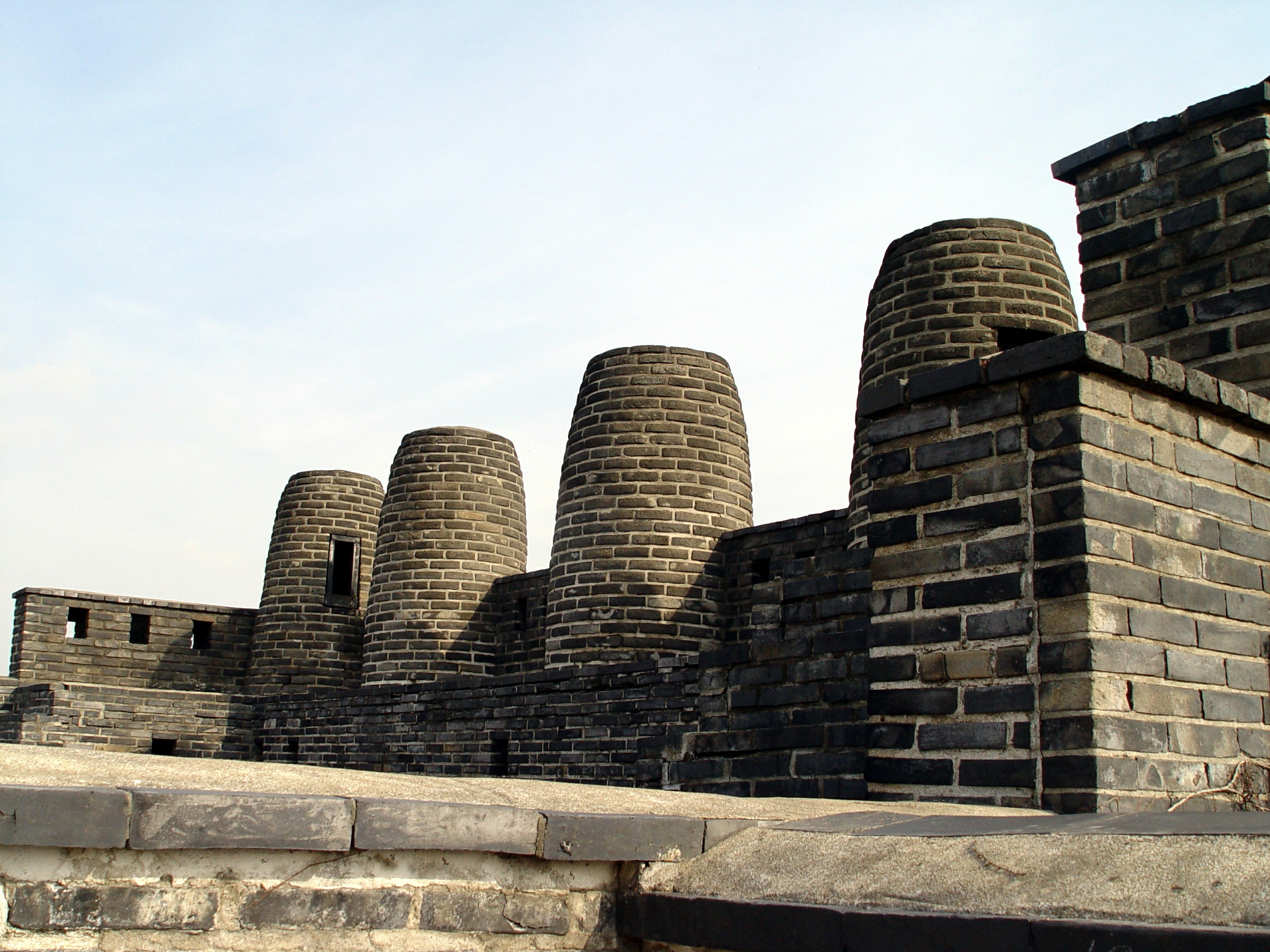
From the wall

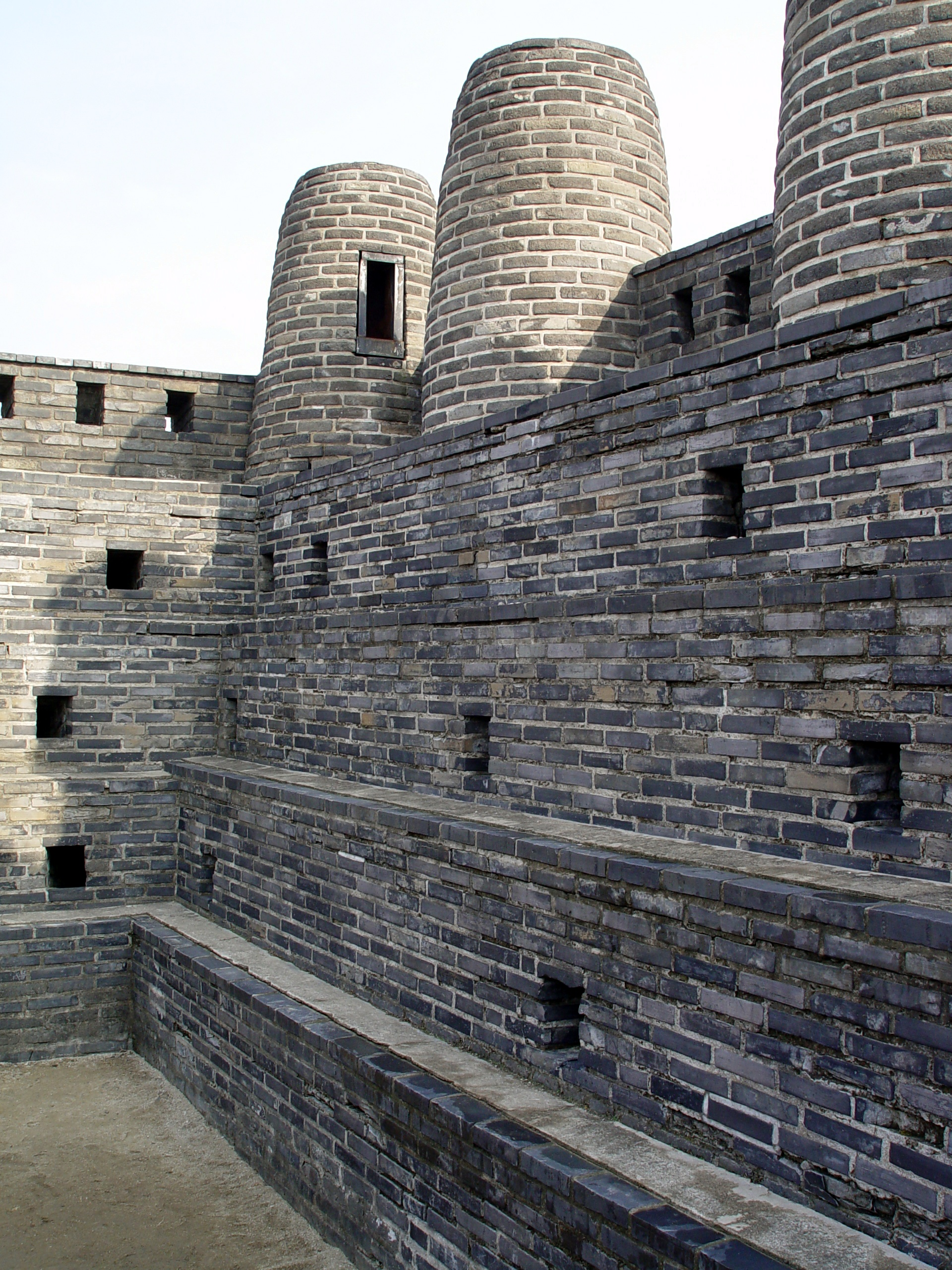
Northern chimneys from inside

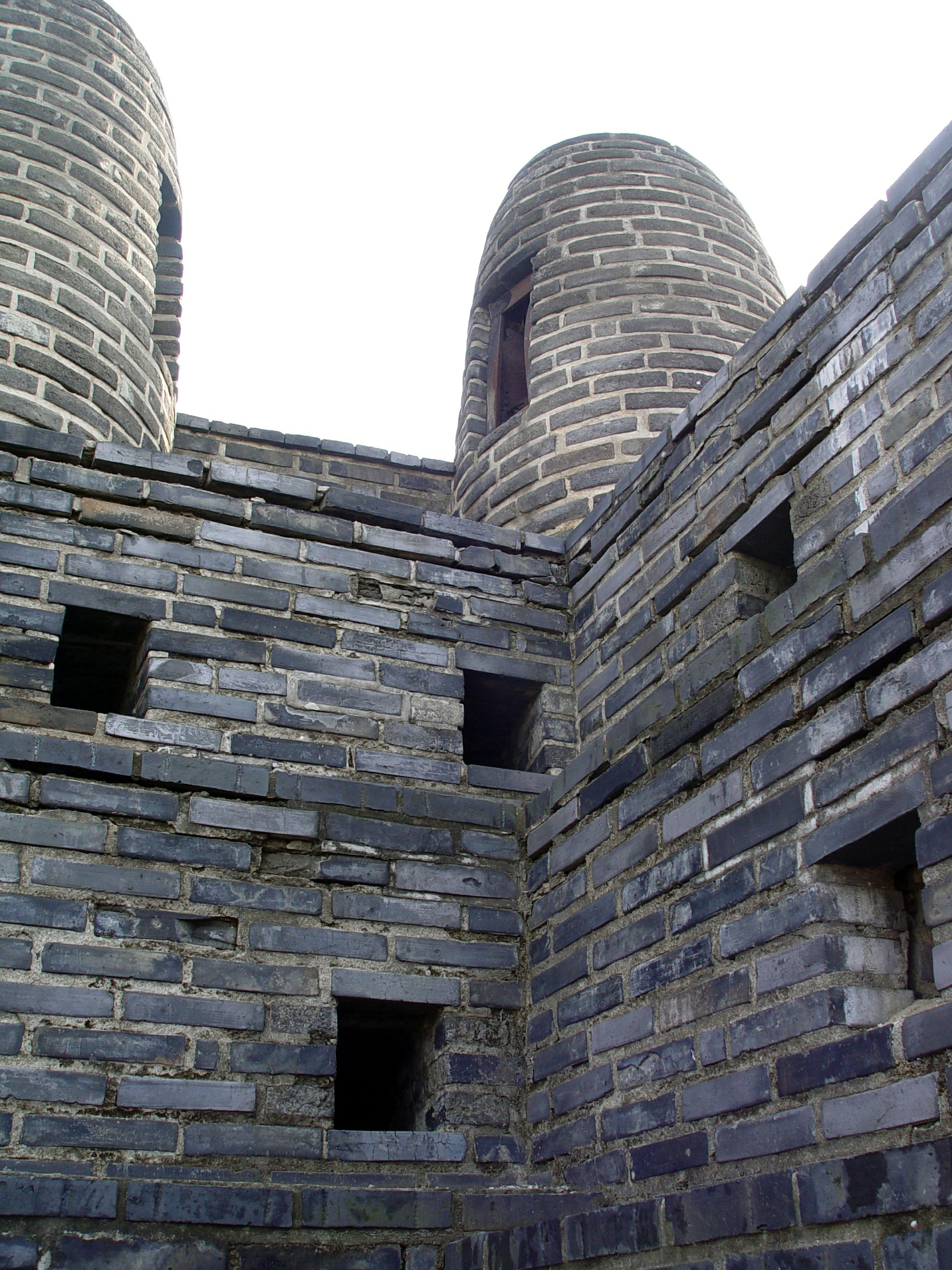
Southern chimney from inside

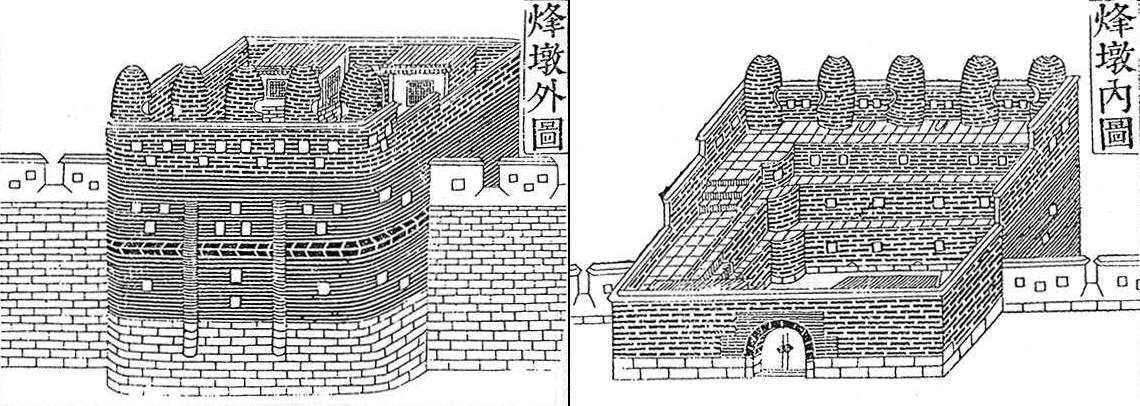
Uigwe picture

=== East Turret No. 2 (동이치) ===
37°16′57″N 127°01′20″E
Dong-i Chi, the second eastern turret, like the other nine turrets around Hwaseong, allowed soldiers to look out in many directions along the exterior of the wall. Unlike the other two eastern turrets, the outer corners of this structure are rounded, the others forming sharp right angles.

East Turret No. 2

=== East GunTower (동포루) ===
37°17′01″N 127°01′23″E
Dong-GunTower, the eastern GunTower, lies between the two eastern turrets. Construction of the post was completed on July 16, 1796. As with other GunTowers in Hwaseong, the interior is of multiple levels to allow various angles for firearms and other weapons.

East GunTower

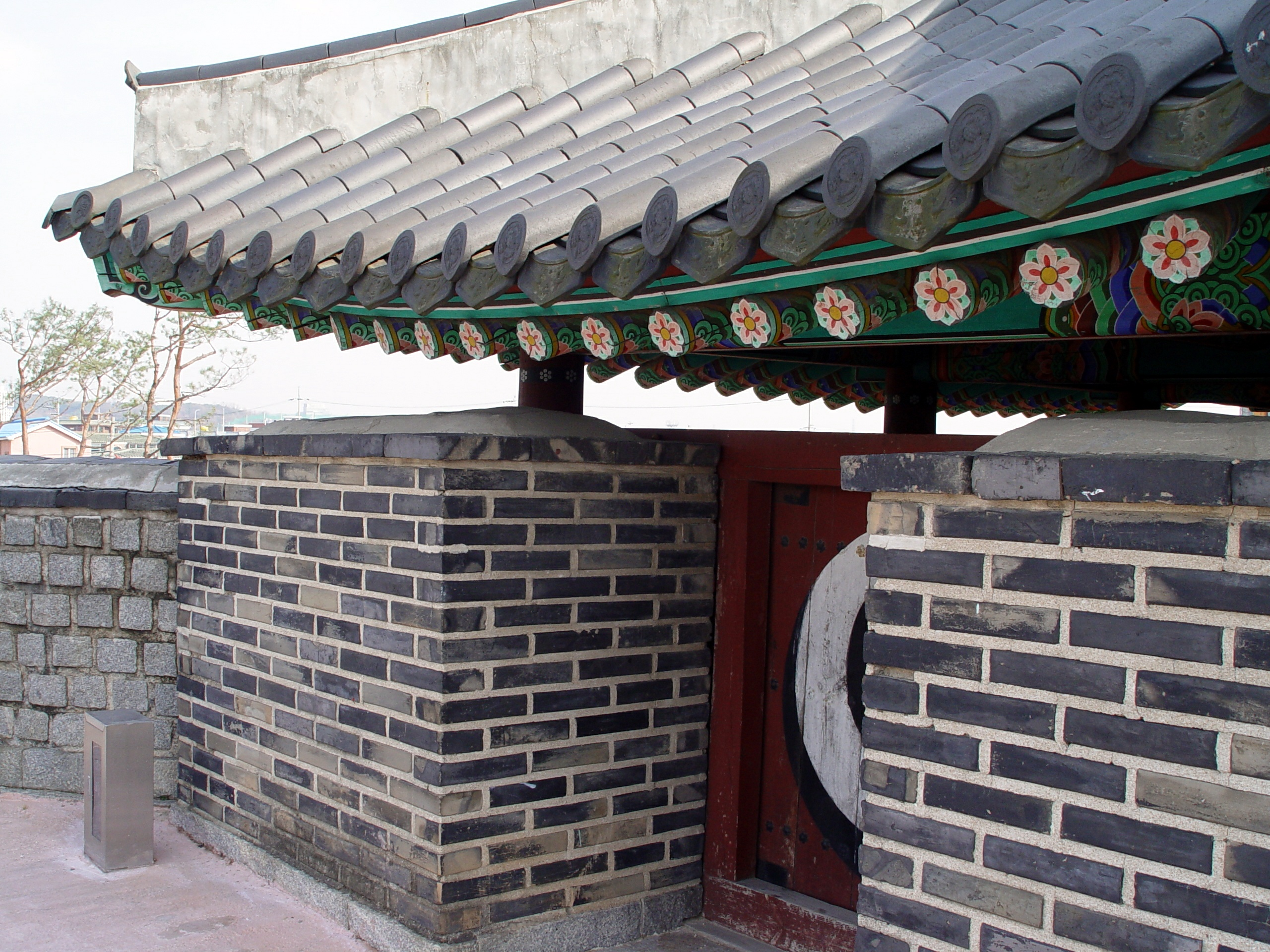
The entrance

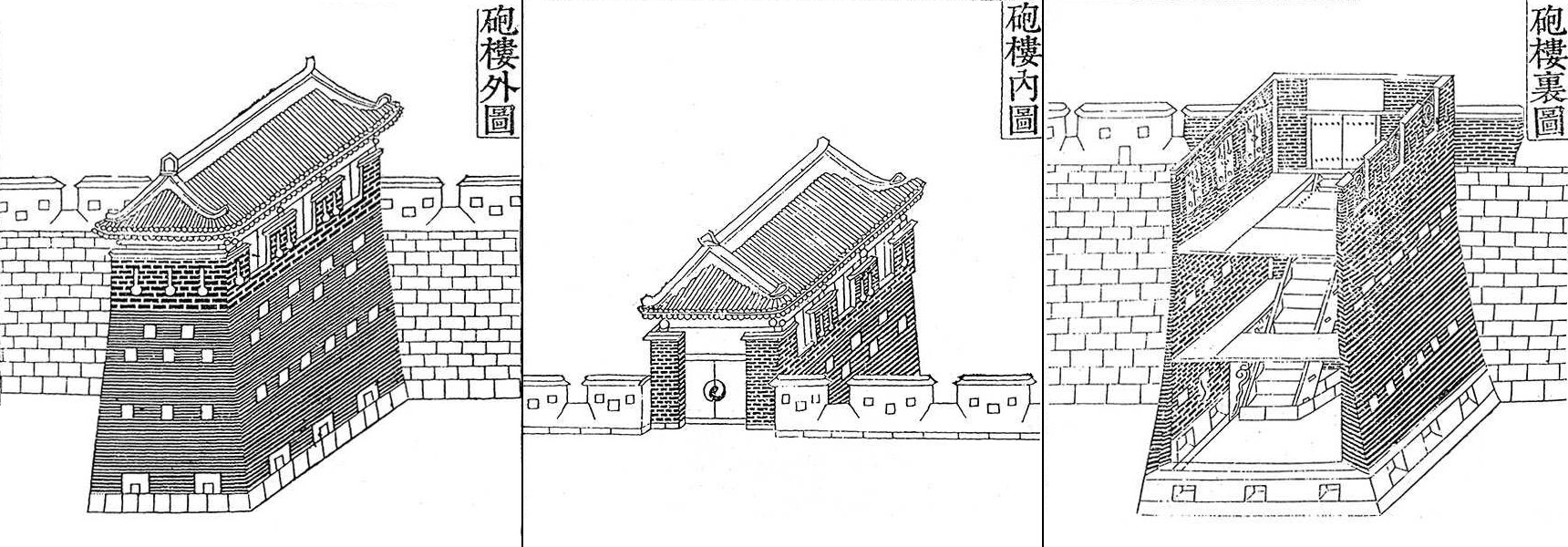
Uigwe picture

=== East Turret No. 1 (동일치) ===
37°17′05″N 127°01′27″E
Dong-il Chi, the first eastern turret, is the first turret south of the first eastern sentry post, lying 148 metres (486 ft) along the wall towards the beacon tower.

East Turret No. 1

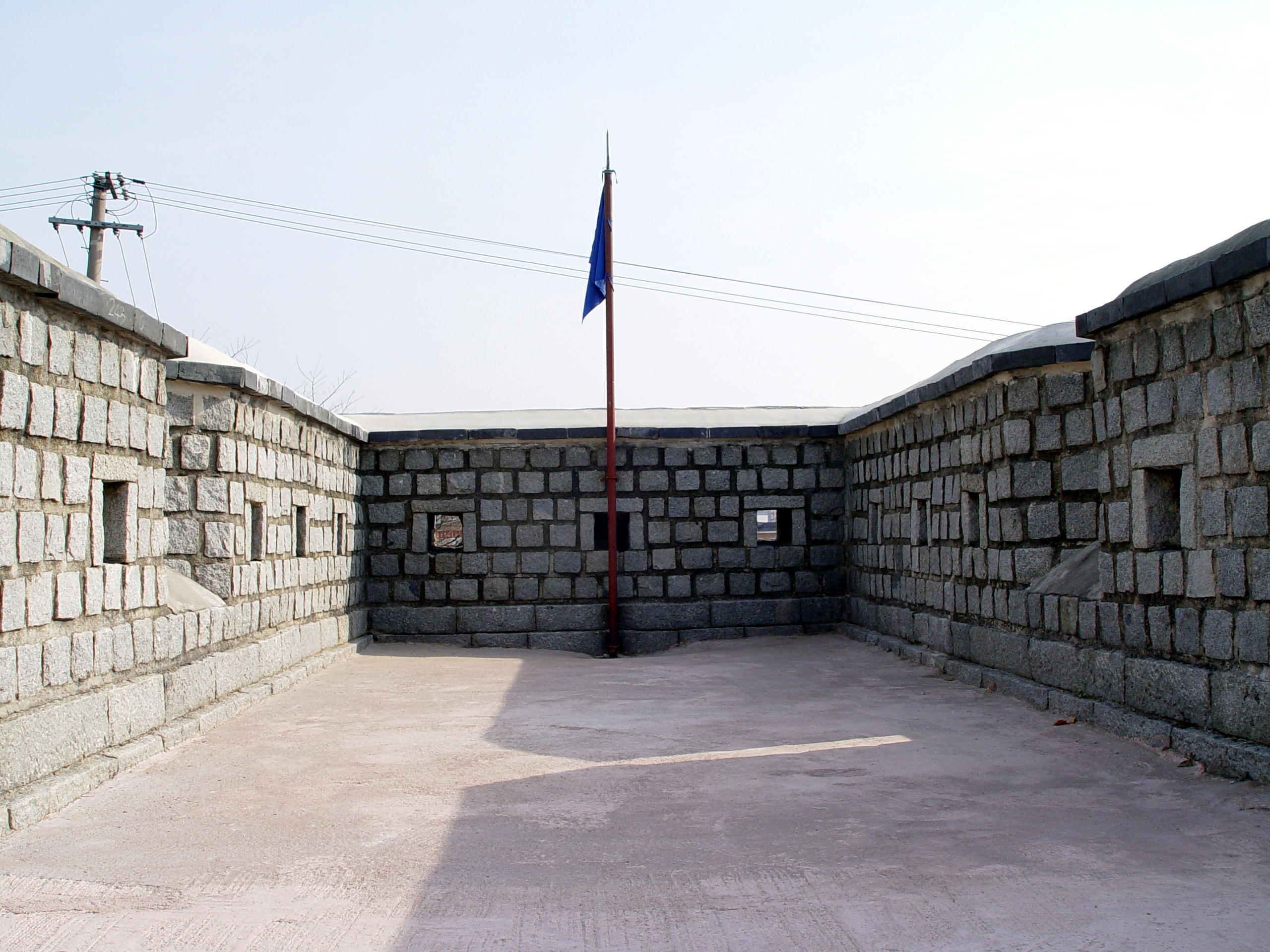
Inside the turret

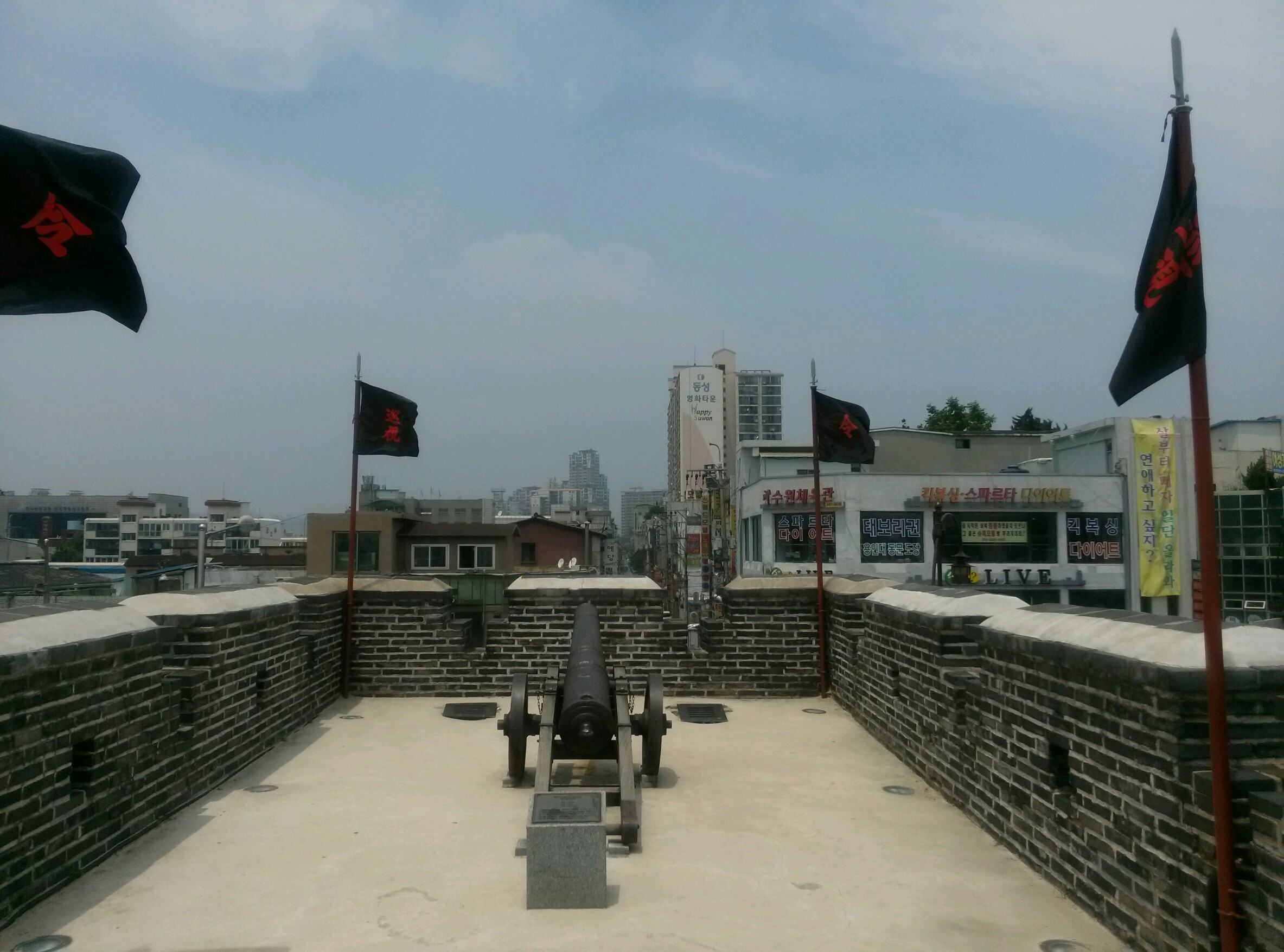

=== East Sentry Post No. 1 (동일포루) ===
37°17′09″N 127°01′28″E
Dongil-SentryPost, the first eastern sentry post, was completed on July 10, 1796. Like the second eastern sentry post, it extends further from the wall than most posts.

East Sentry Post No. 1

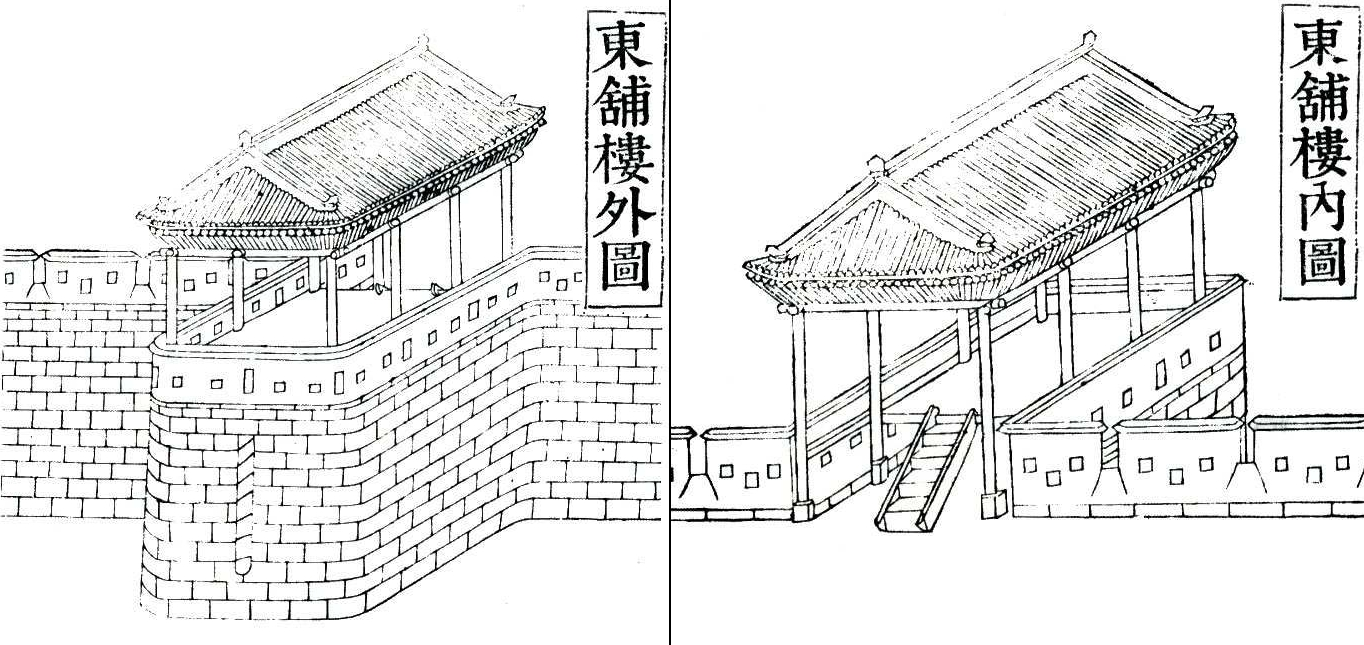
Uigwe picture

=== East Gate (창룡문) ===
37°17′16″N 127°01′31″E
Changnyongmun, known locally as Dongmun (East Gate), sits by a major road junction. Its stone base is capped with a one-storey wooden pavilion. The gate was destroyed during the Korean War, but was reconstructed in 1975.

East Gate

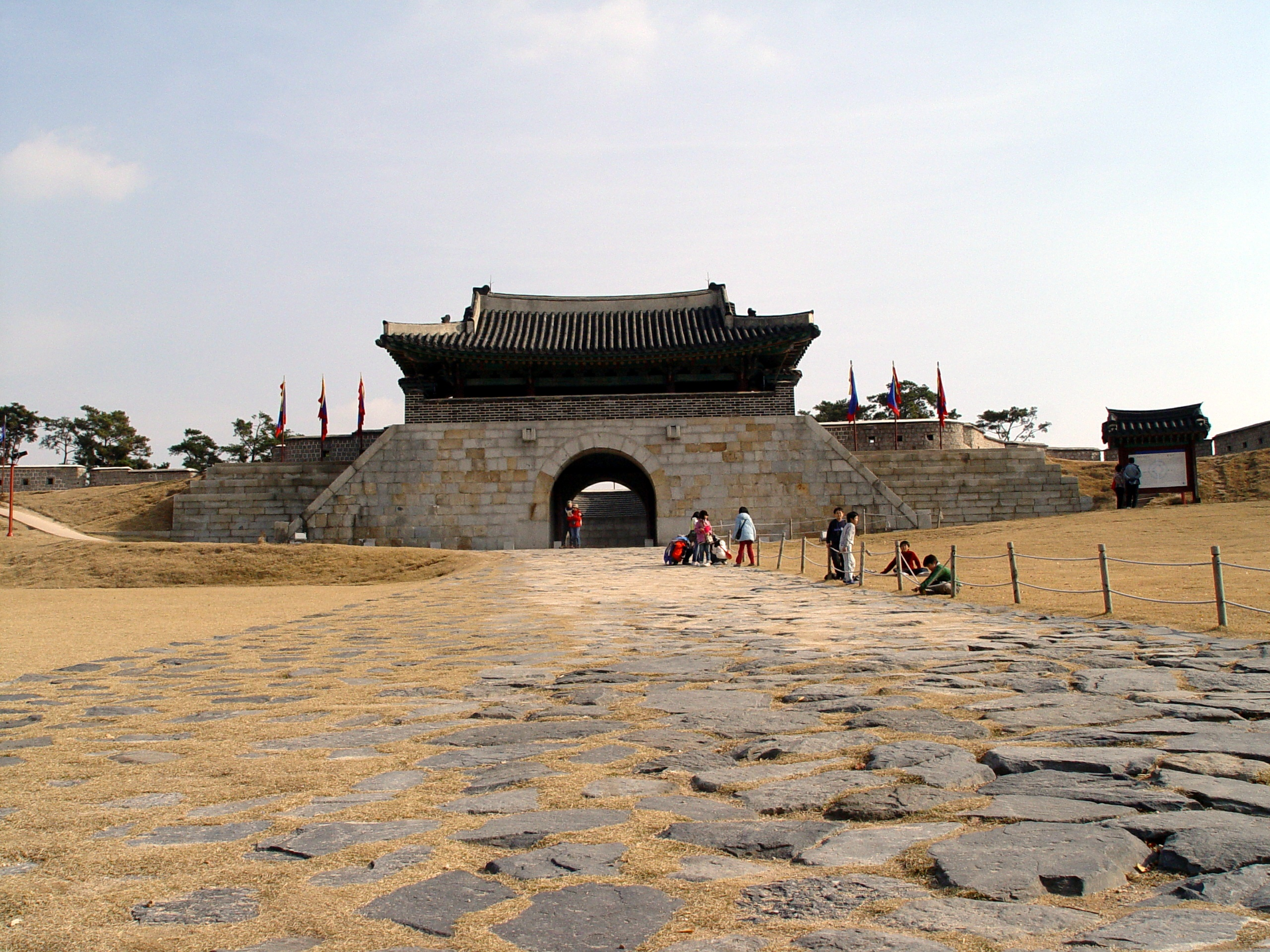
The western face

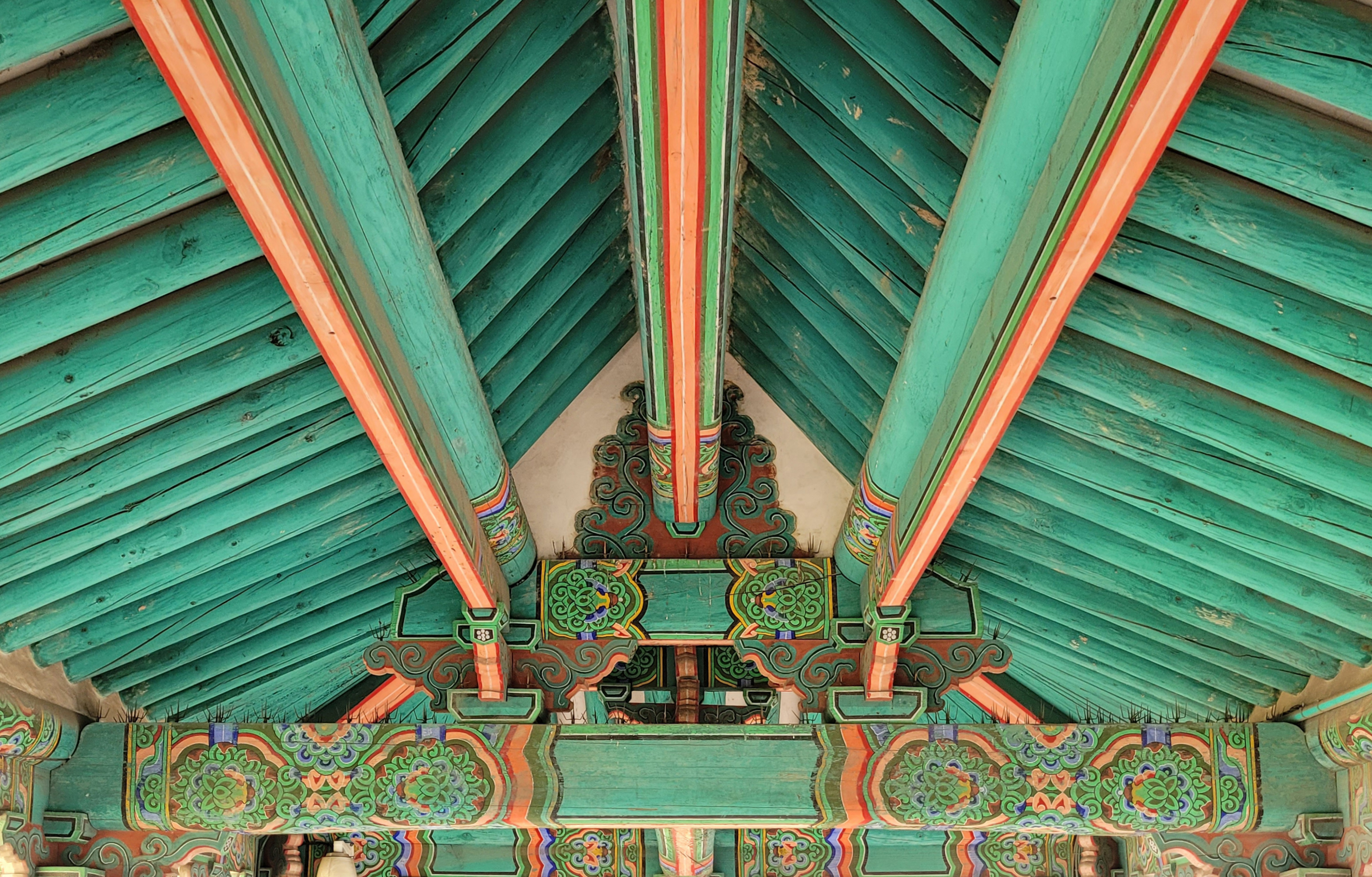
Ceiling of the gate

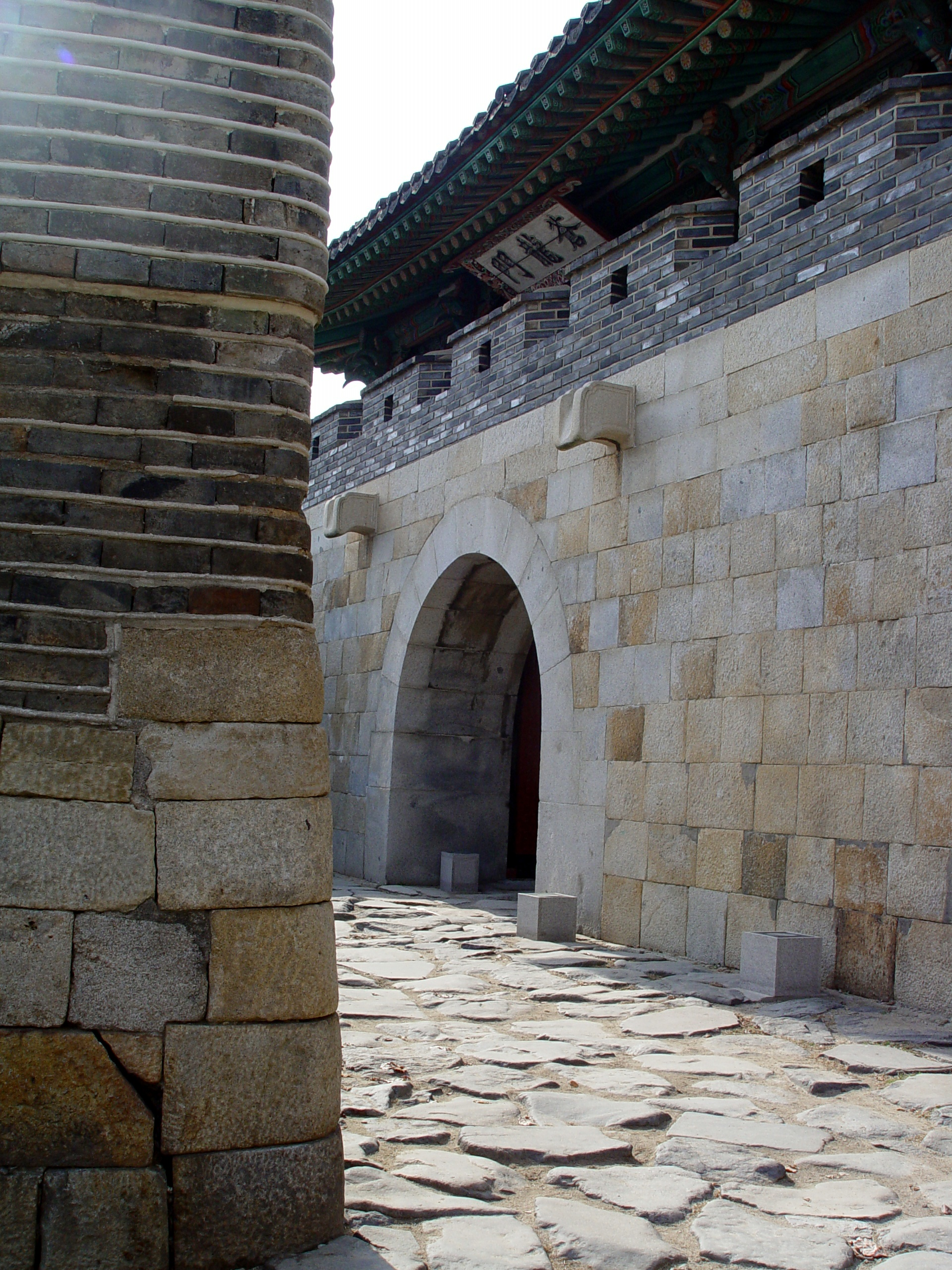
The eastern face

=== North-East Crossbow Platform (동북노대) ===
37°17′20″N 127°01′31″E
Dongbuk Nodae is one of two crossbow platforms in the fortress and is situated within reach of the east gate and has a wide field of view as it sits on a corner of the wall, enabling archers to target assailants from many angles.

North-East Crossbow Platform

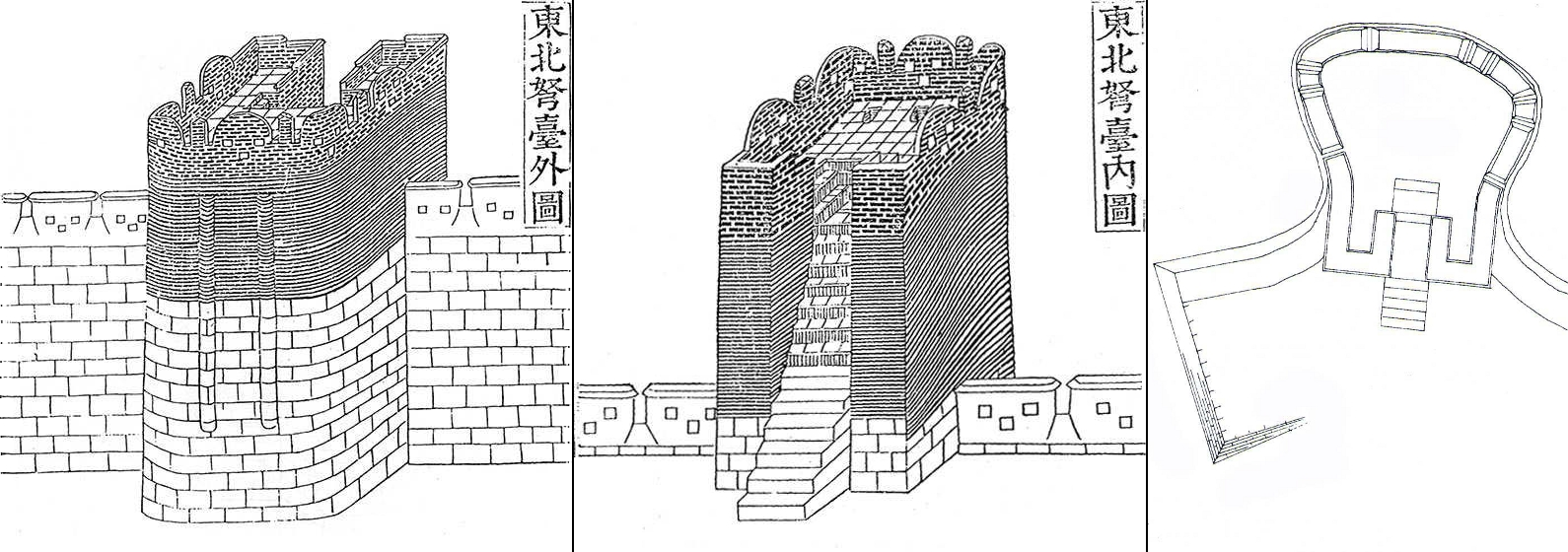
Uigwe picture

=== North-East Observation Tower (동북공심돈) ===
37°17′22″N 127°01′28″E
Dongbuk Gongsimdon, meaning the north-east observation tower, is situated beside Changnyongmun. Oval in shape, its three stories stand 6.8 metres (22 ft) tall. The roof is accessible by an internal spiral staircase

North-East Observation Tower

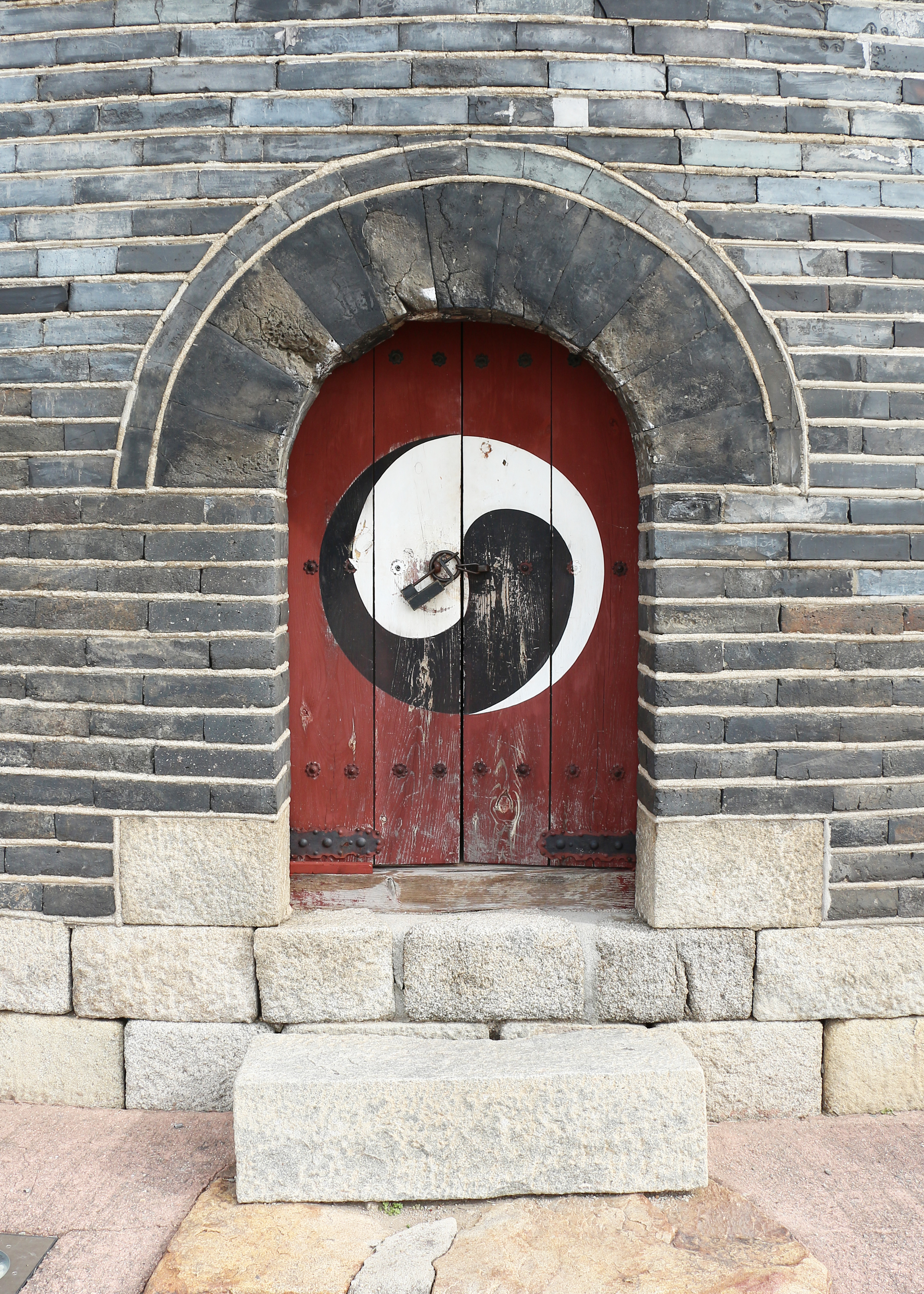
Door of the tower

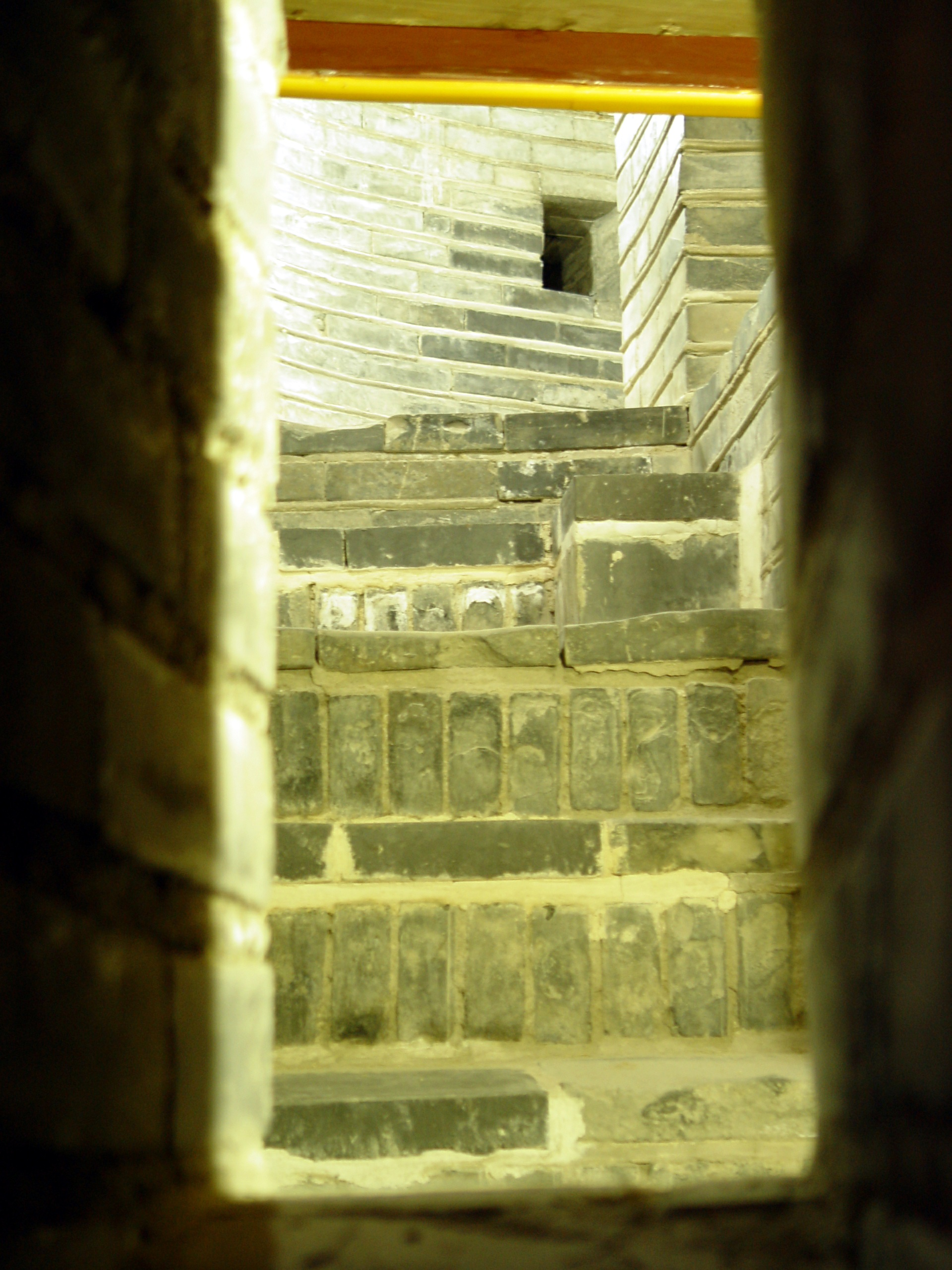
Internal spiral staircase seen through window from outside

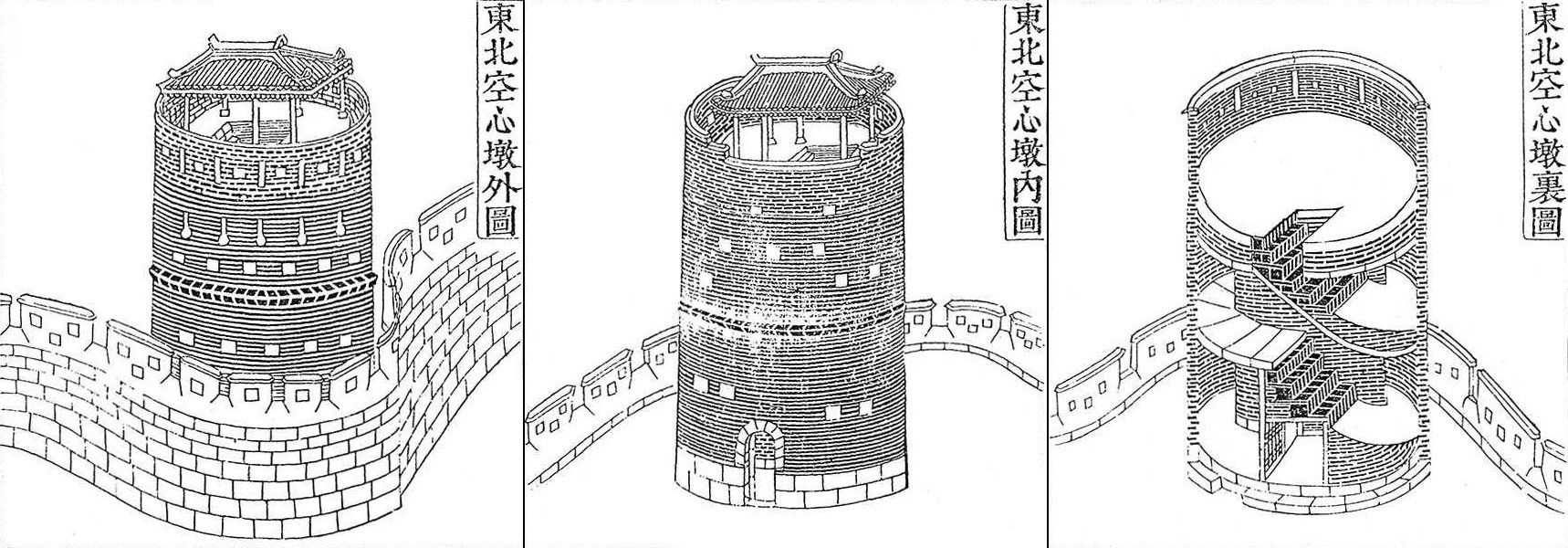
Uigwe picture

=== East Command Post (동장대) ===
37°17′18″N 127°01′23″E
Dongjangdae, meaning eastern command post, stands next to Dongbuk Gongsimdon, facing Changnyongmun across an archery field. When the king was in residence in Haenggung, within the fortress walls, there were two generals and four soldiers on guard in this command post at all times. (There were five night shifts.) Each officer was armed with a bow and arrow, sword and baton. The command post is nicknamed Yeonmudae, a reference to its second function as a training camp.

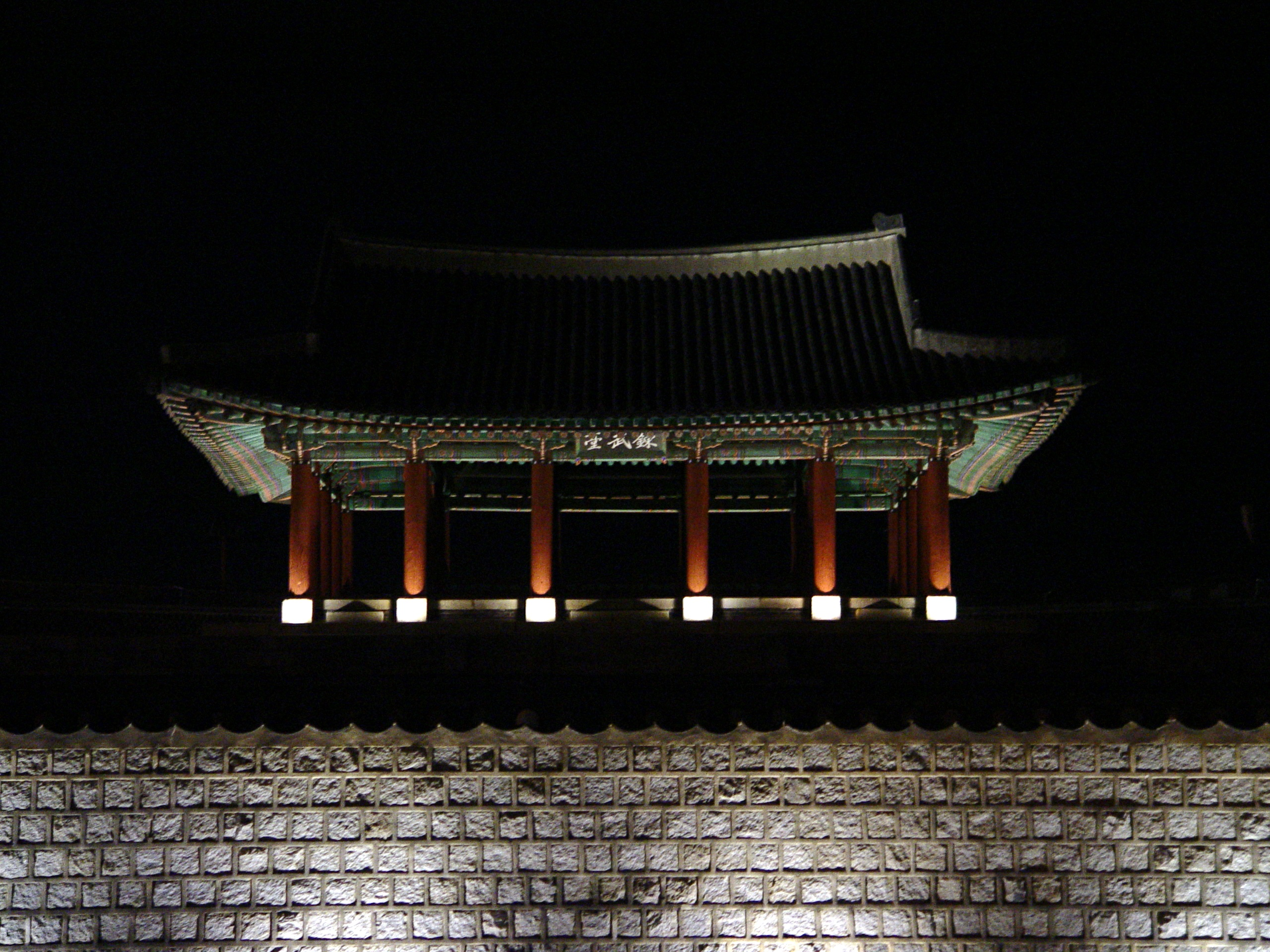
Nighttime view of the southern side

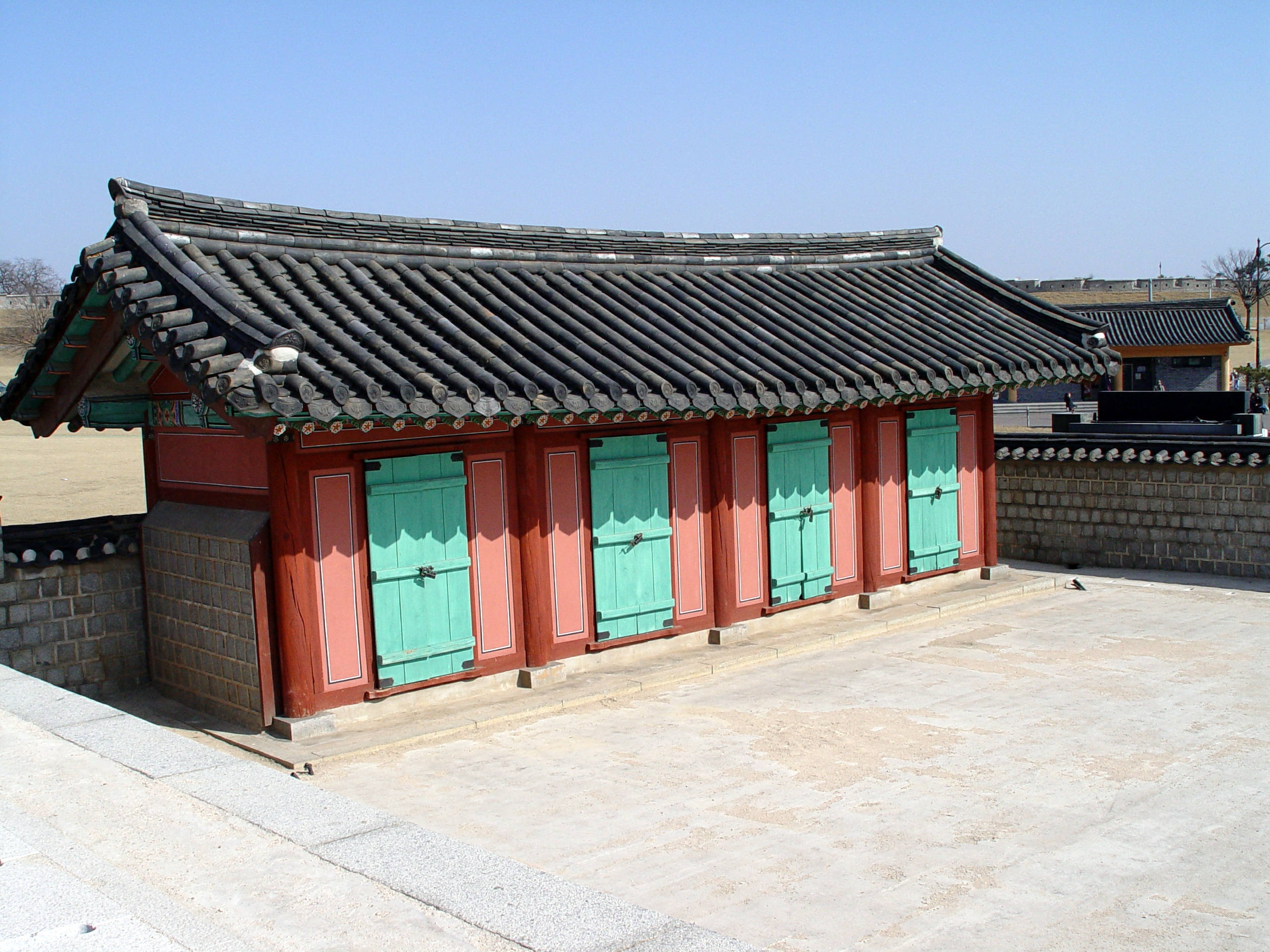
Annexe just below the main building

=== East Secret Gate (동암문) ===
37°17′14″N 127°01′17″E
Dongammun, the eastern secret gate, situated 140 metres (459 ft) from Dongjangdae, was used for passage of people, animals and munitions. Construction of the gate, which sits beneath a brick structure surmounted with a large round parapet, was completed on March 25, 1796.

East Secret Gate

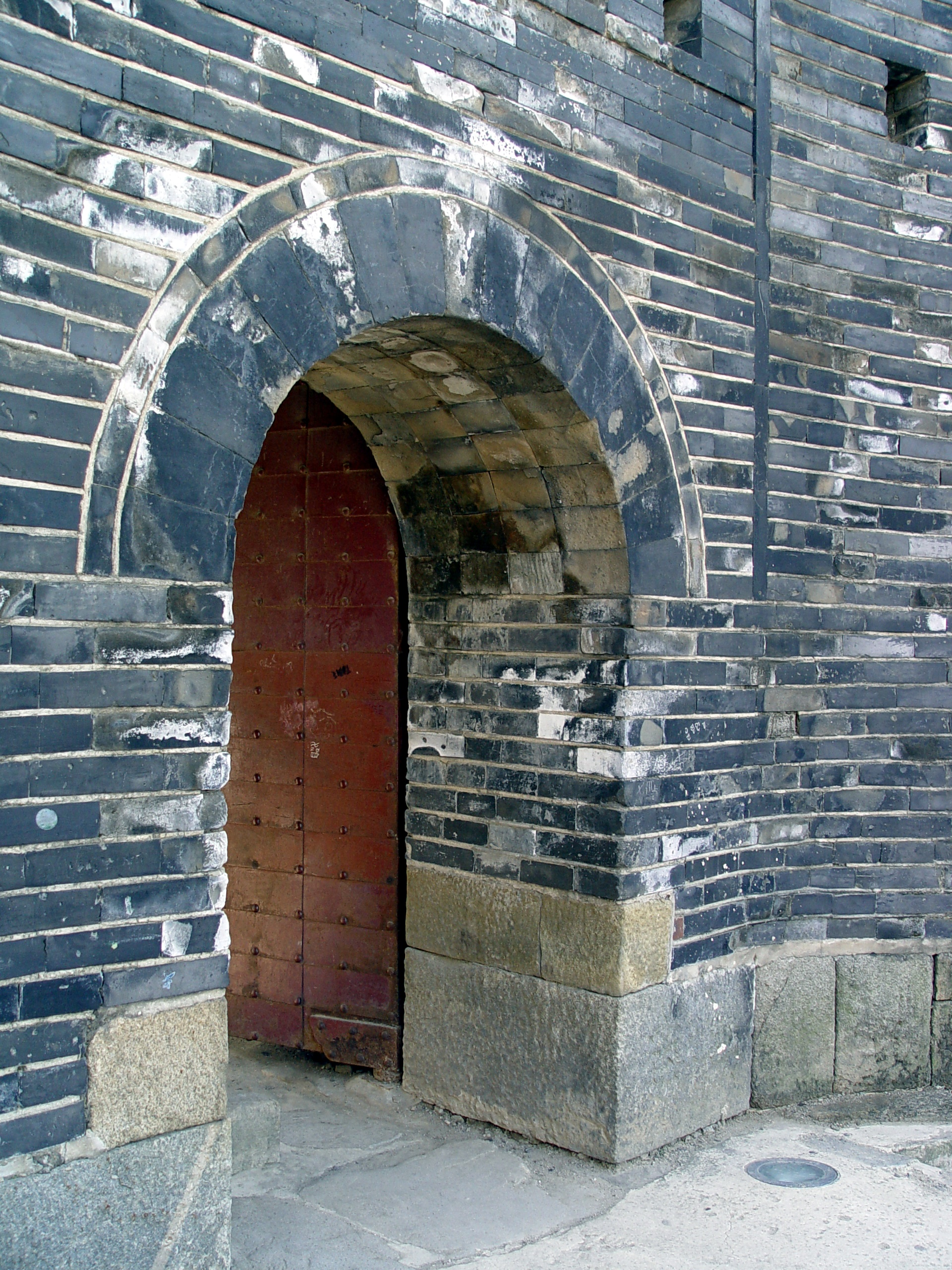
Door seen from outside

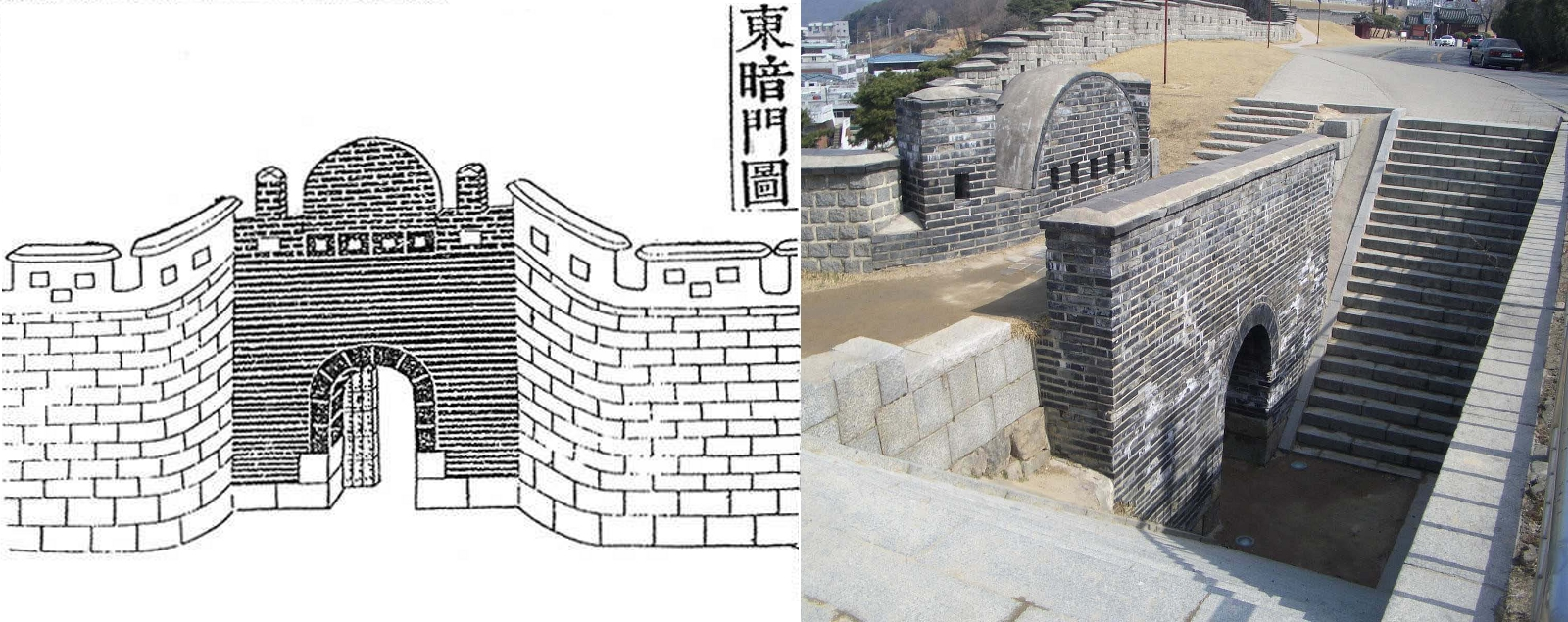
Uigwe picture

=== East-North Sentry Post (동북포루) ===
37°17′15″N 127°01′11″E
The Dongbuk-SentryPost stands between the north and east secret gates, and protects their outskirts. This structure shall not be confused with the Bukdong-GunTower.

East-North Sentry Post

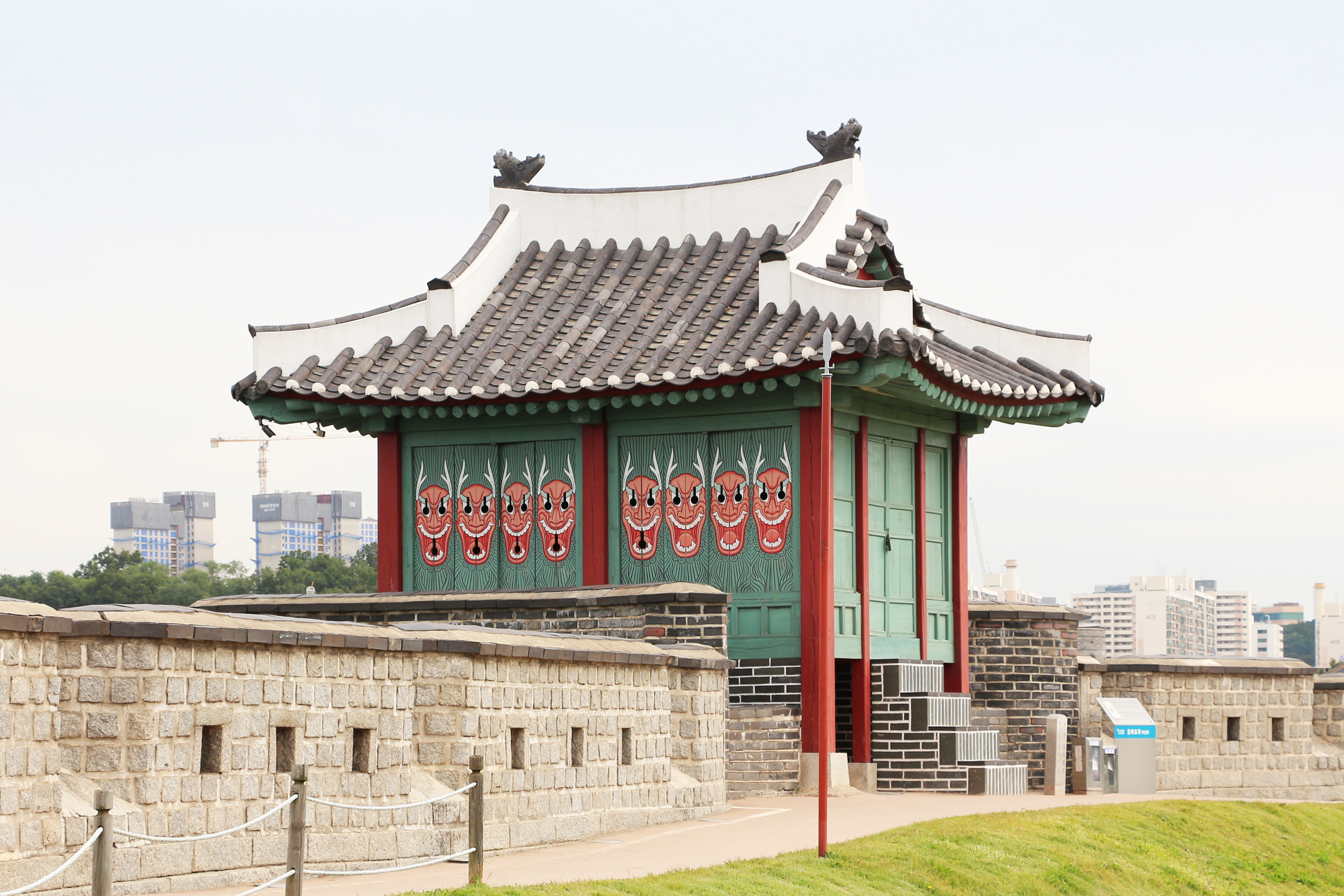

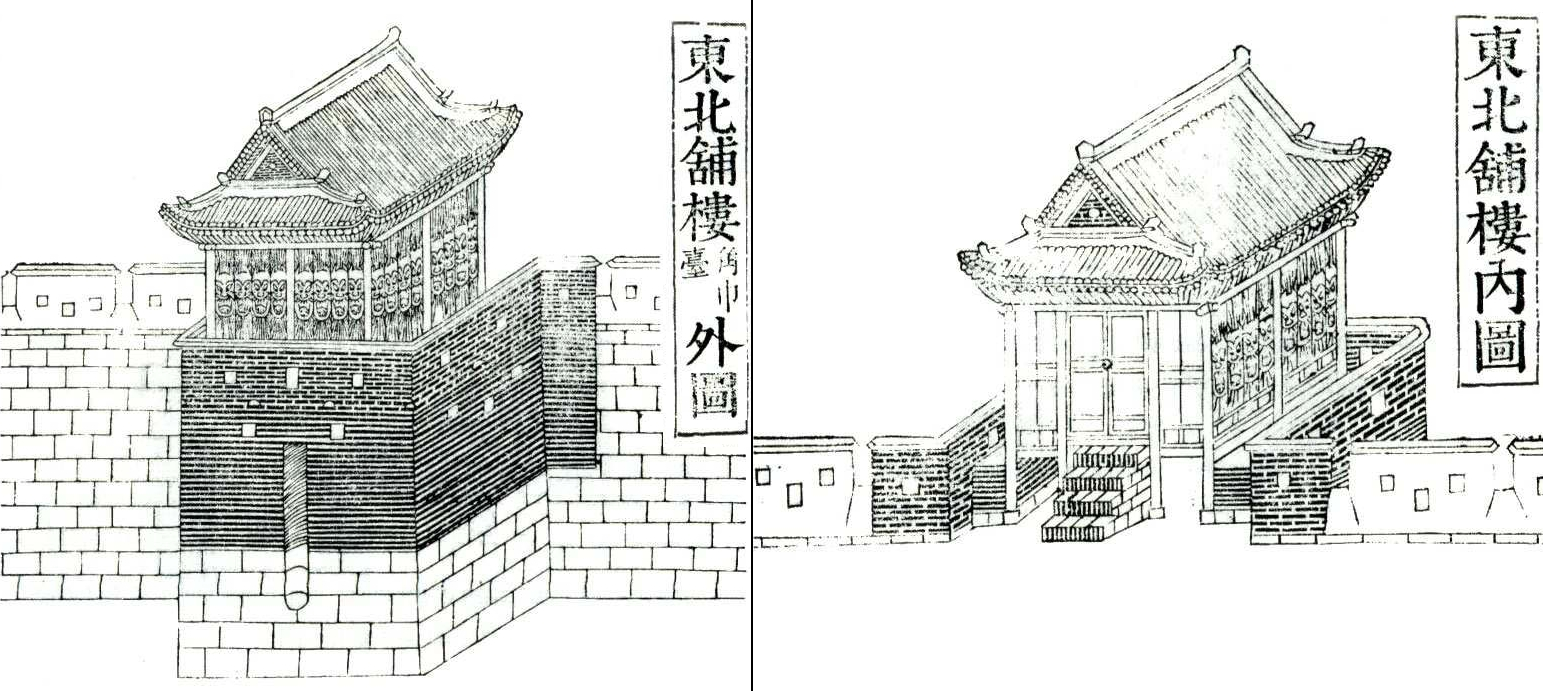
Uigwe picture

=== North Secret Gate (북암문) ===
37°17′14″N 127°01′07″E
Bukammun, or officially the third north gate (제3북암문) is the only remaining secret gate of the three originals. It lies close to the north-east pavilion.

North Secret Gate

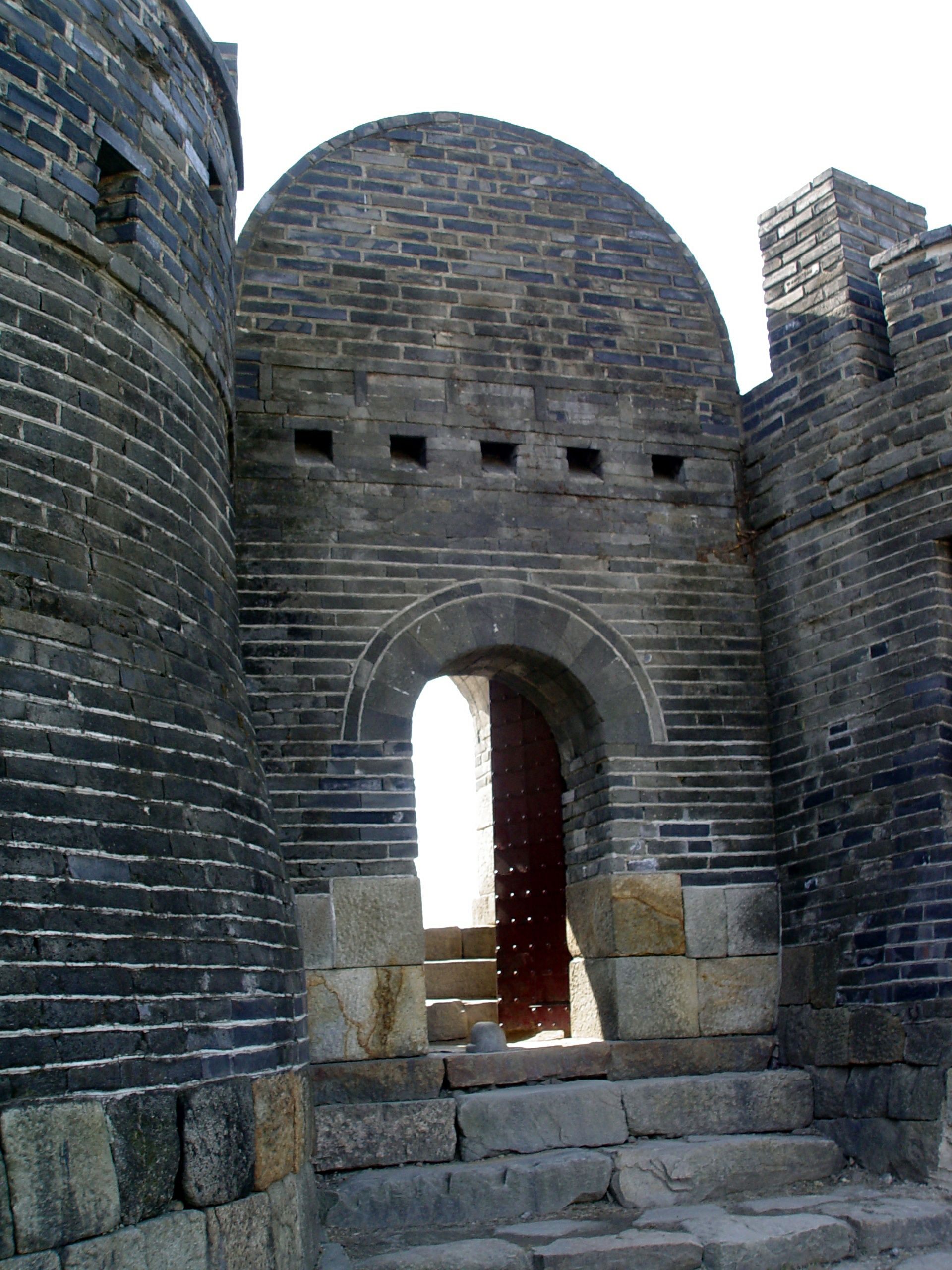
Outside face

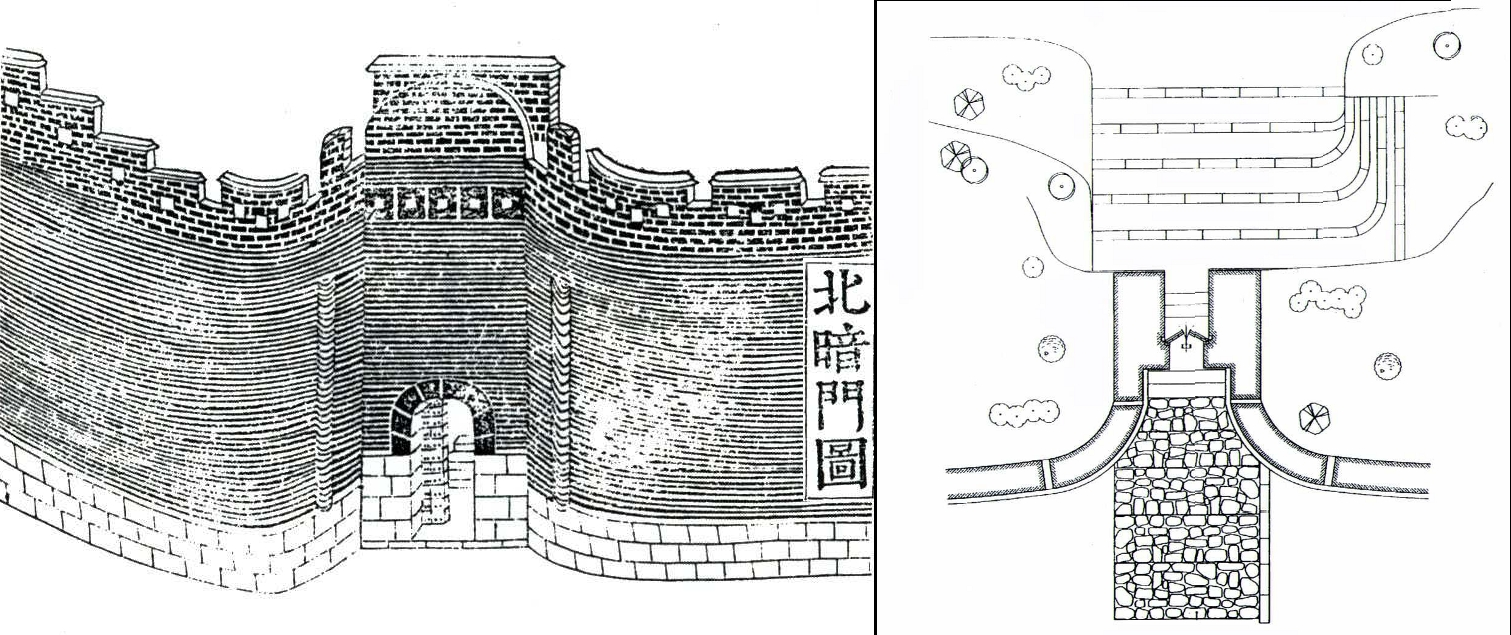
Uigwe picture

=== North-East Pavilion (동북각루) ===
37°17′15″N 127°01′06″E
The north-east pavilion is known as Dongbuk Gangnu and nicknamed Banghwasuryujeong. It sits above Yongyeon, a pond surrounded by a small garden. It was originally intended to be the second battle command post, though its scenic location made it a place favoured instead for feasts.

North-East Pavilion

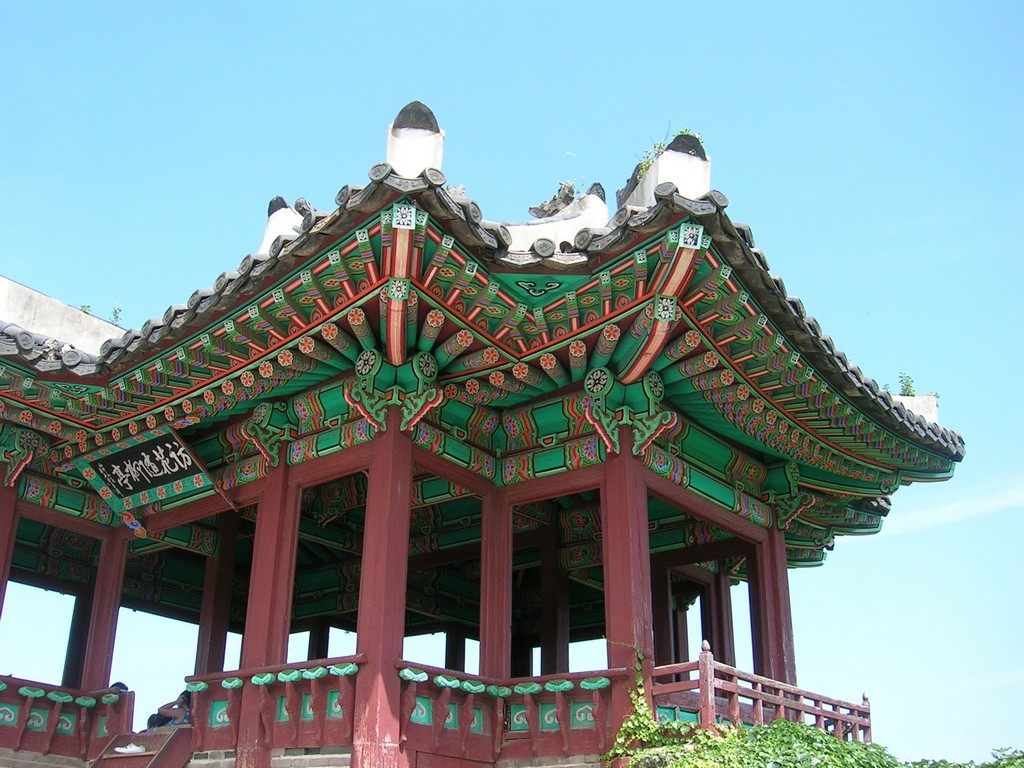
Closeup

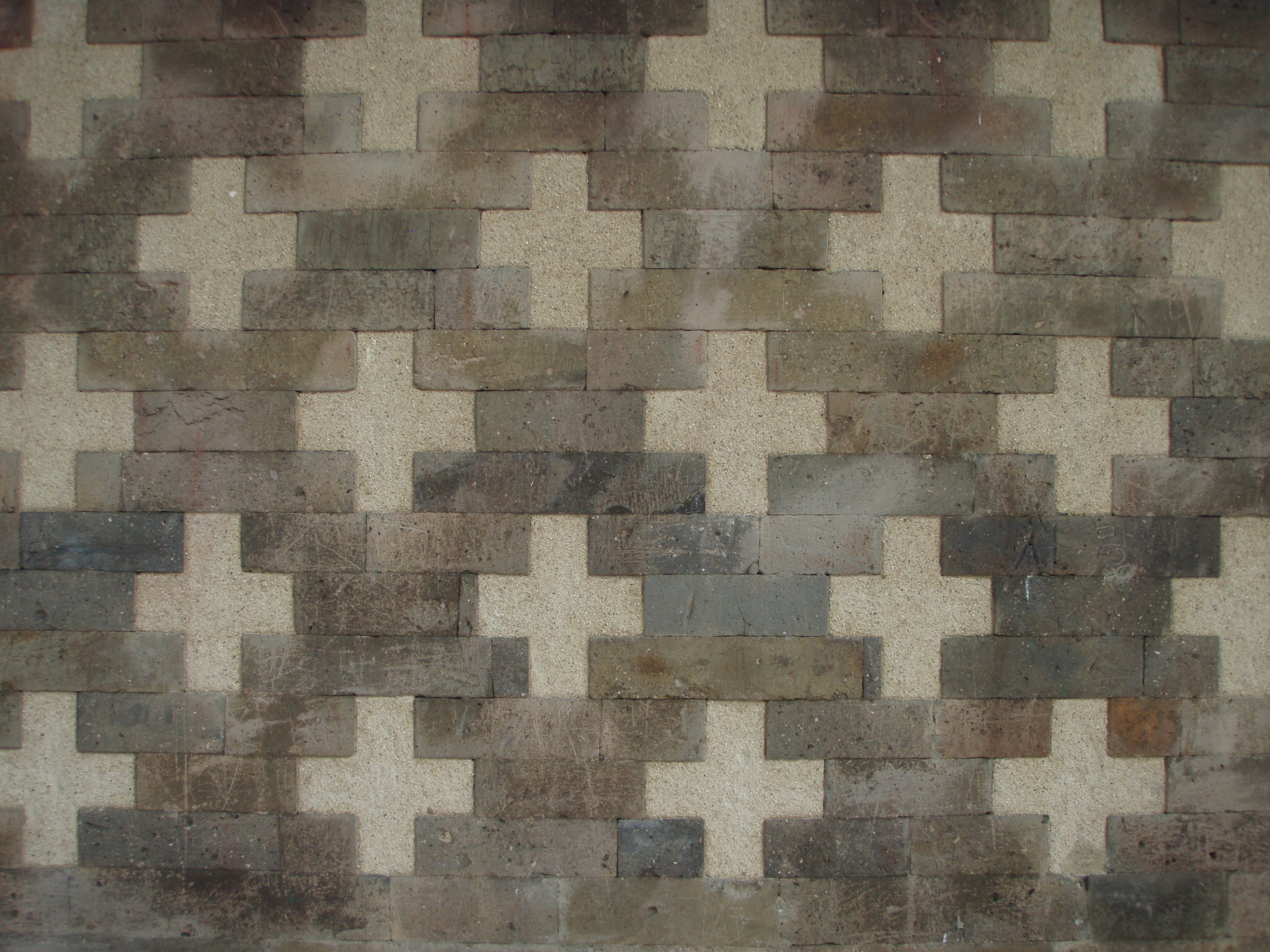
Closeup of wall

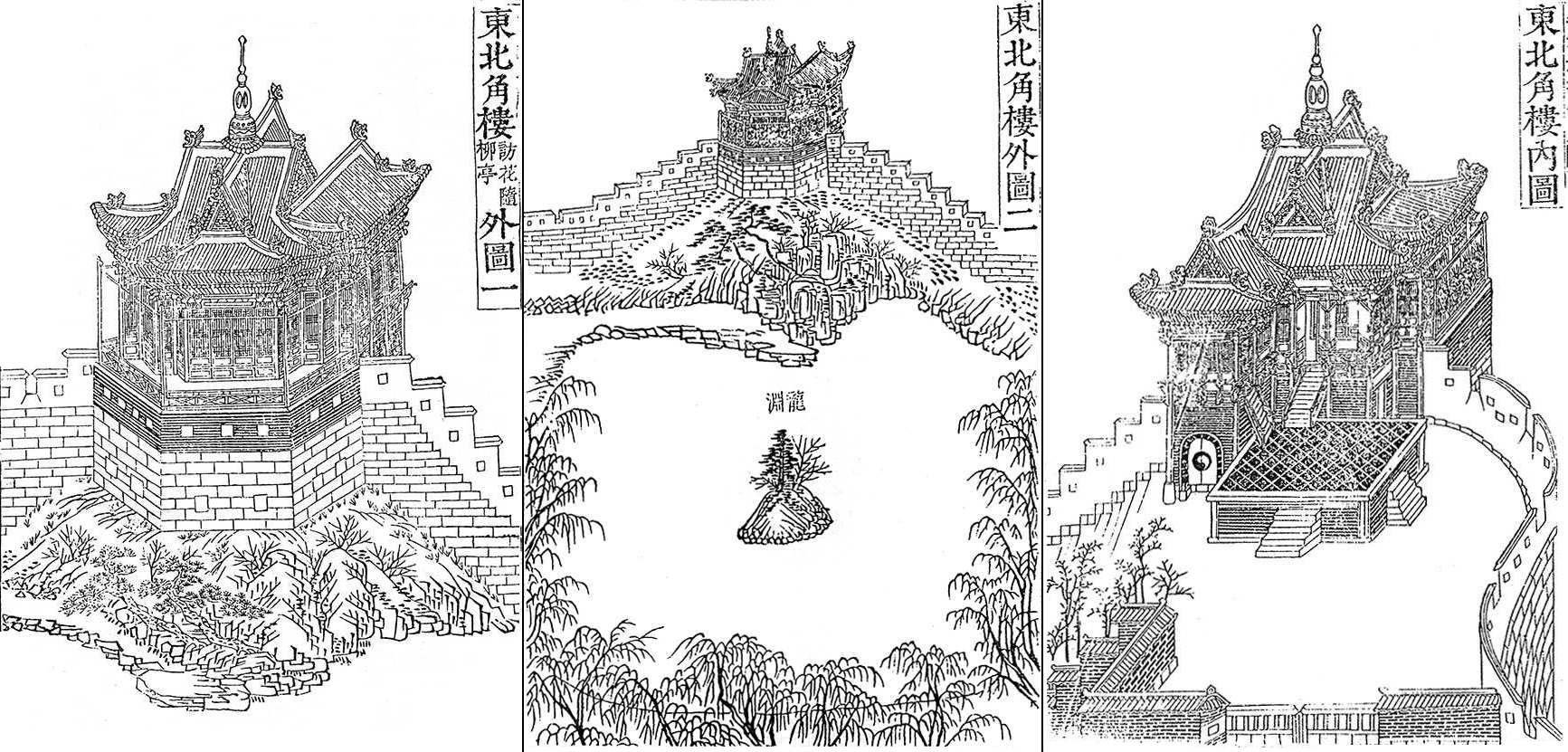
Uigwe picture

=== Hwahongmun (화홍문) ===
37°17′15″N 127°01′04″E
Hwahongmun, otherwise known as Buksumun, is the gate under which the Suwoncheon flows on entering the area encompassed by Hwaseong and exited through Namsumun. The gate has the obvious function of being a bridge, but also housed cannons for defensive purposes. The Suwoncheon was widened at this point and the gate has seven arches through which it passes.

Hwahongmun

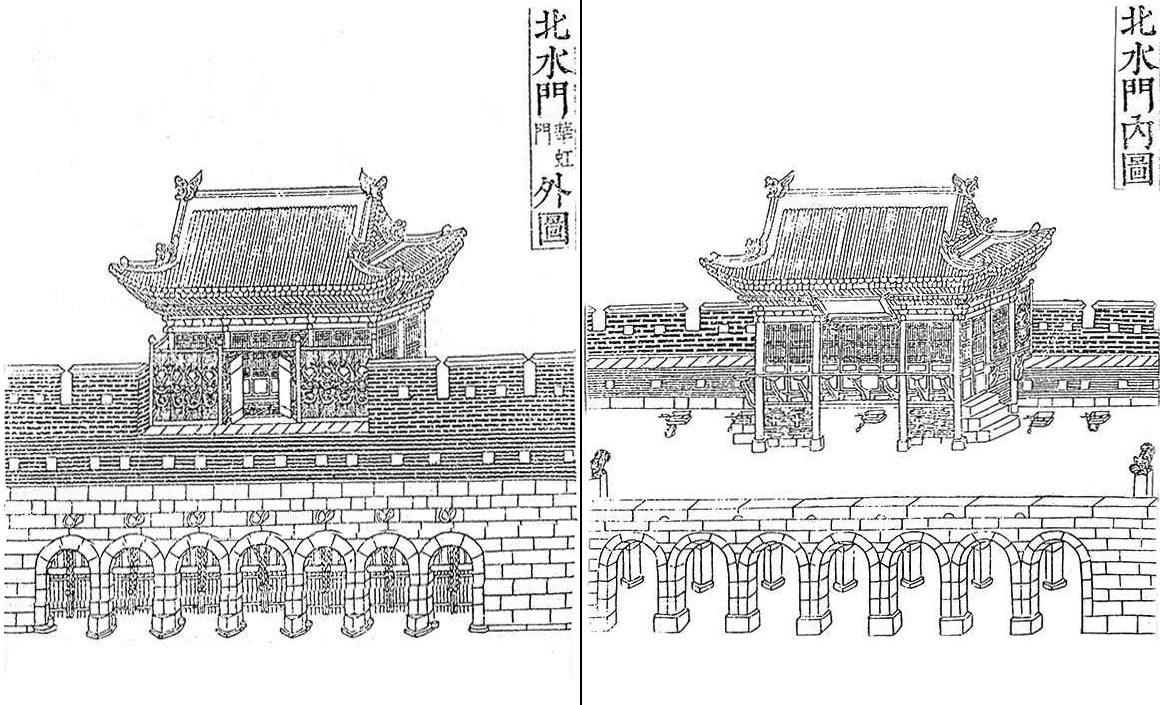
Uigwe picture

=== North-East GunTower (북동포루) ===
37°17′19″N 127°01′00″E
Bukdong-GunTower sits between Janganmun and Hwahongmun. This tower controls the North-East outskirts of the Fortress, and protects Hwahongmun. It was completed on September 23, 1794. Not to be confused with 동북포루, the East-North SentryPost.

North-East GunTower

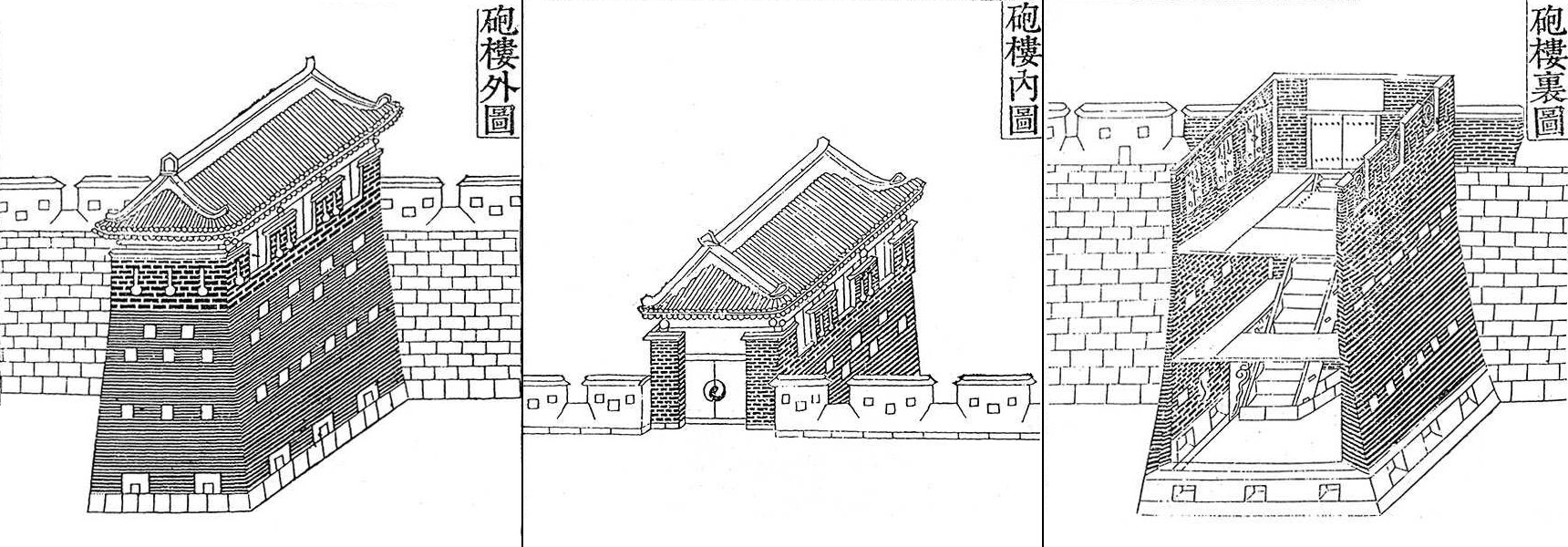
Uigwe picture

=== North-East Turret (북동치) ===
37°17′21″N 127°00′54″E
Bukdong Chi, the north-eastern turret, sits immediately to the east of the north-eastern gate guard platform.

North-East Turret

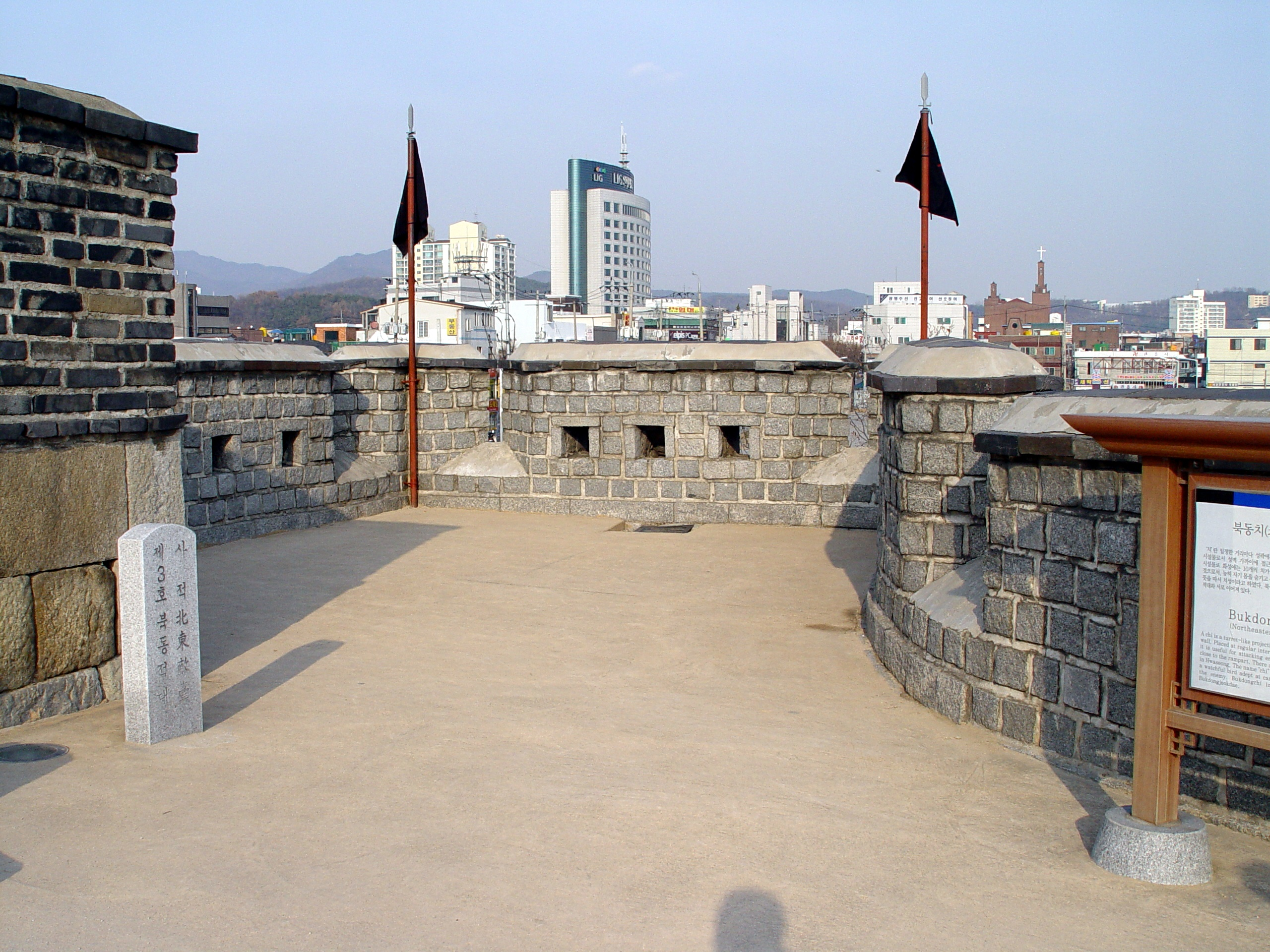
From the wall

=== North-East Gate Guard Platform (북동적대) ===
37°17′21″N 127°00′53″E
Bukdong Jeokdae is a platform immediately to the east of Janganmun. It housed a cannon to protect the gate and its ongseong.

North-East Gate Guard Platform

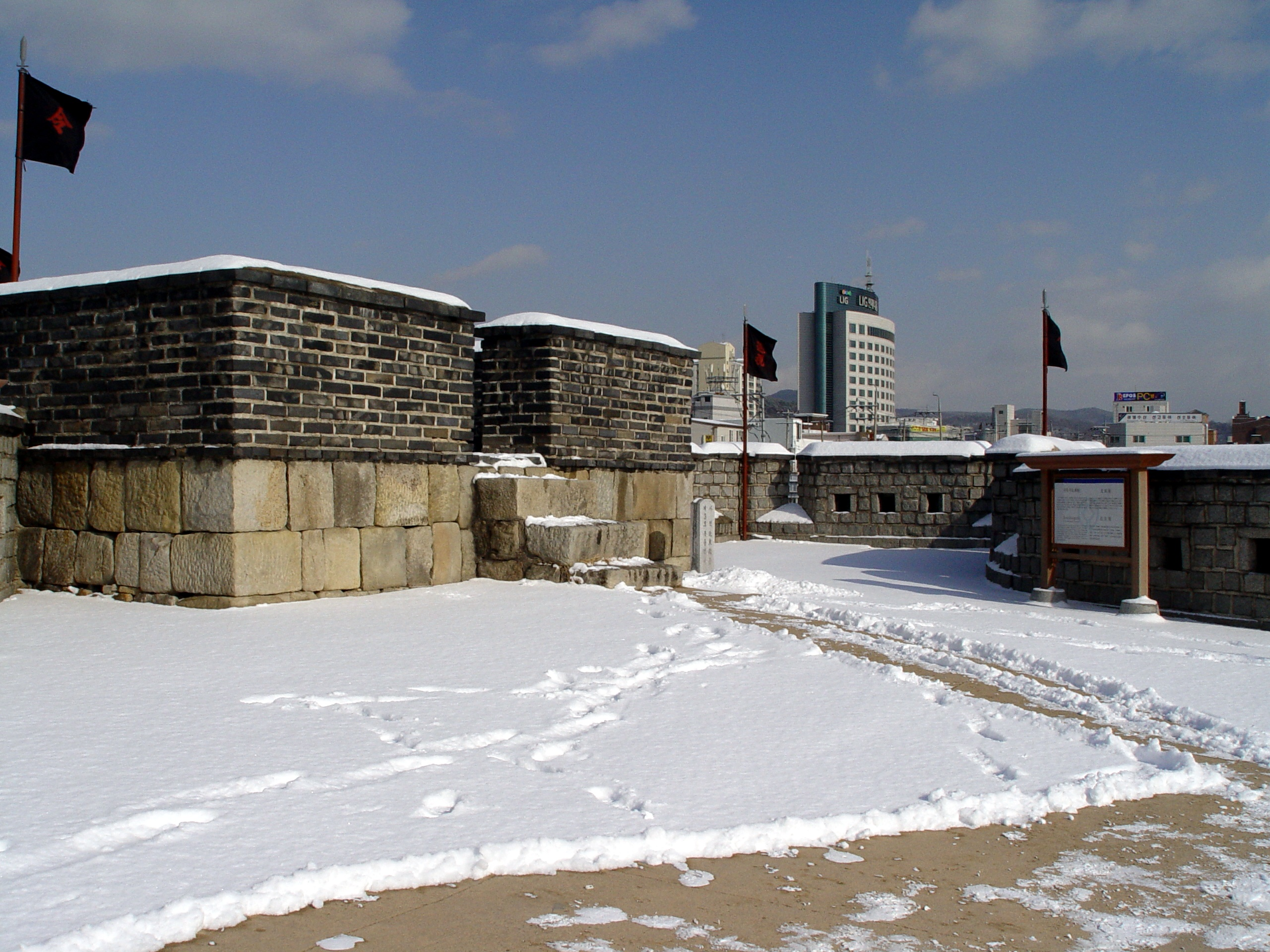
See from the west in snow

=== North Gate (장안문) ===
37°17′20″N 127°00′51″E
Janganmun, known locally as Bungmun (North Gate), is the largest such gate in Korea. Some believe this is intentional, as it is through this gate that visitors from Seoul will have entered Suwon and this would be in keeping with King Jeongjo's original desire to move the capital of the country to Suwon. Janganmun's stone base is capped with a two-storey wooden pavilion. A small, semi-circular protective wall known as an ongseong, is located outside the gate. The gate was destroyed in the Korean War and reconstructed in the 1970s.

North Gate

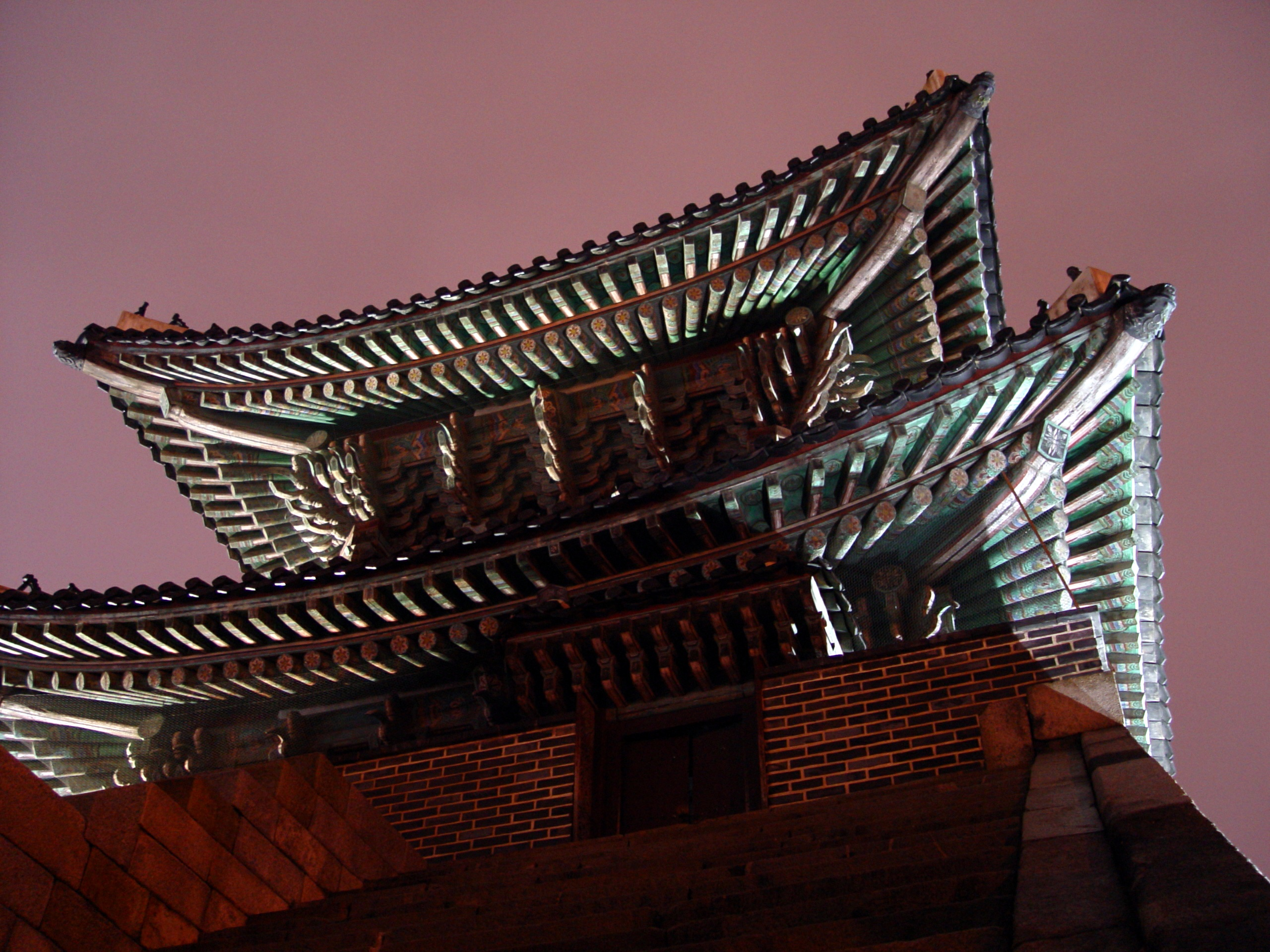
Nighttime view of the roof

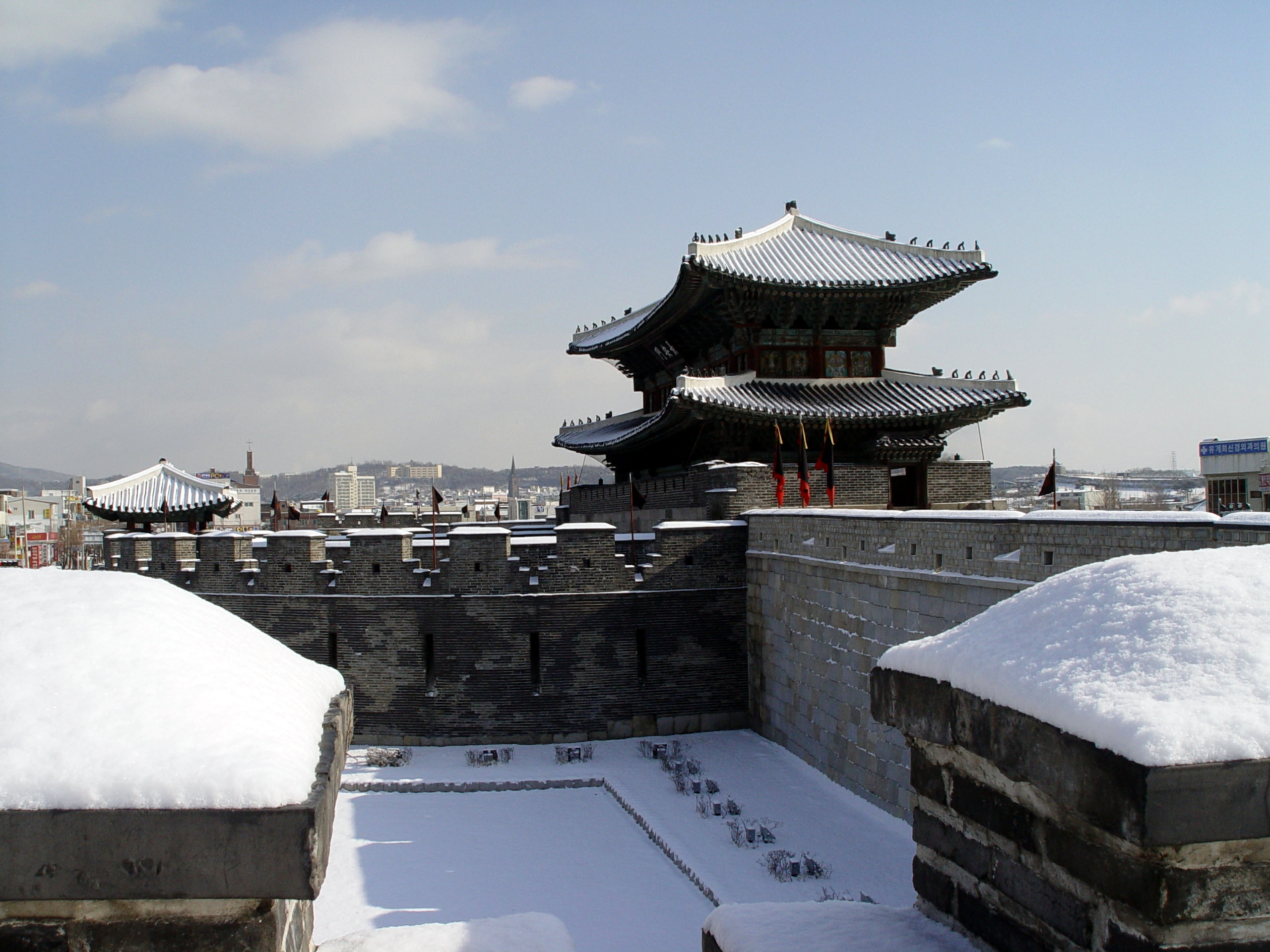
Seen from Bukseo Jeokdae in snow

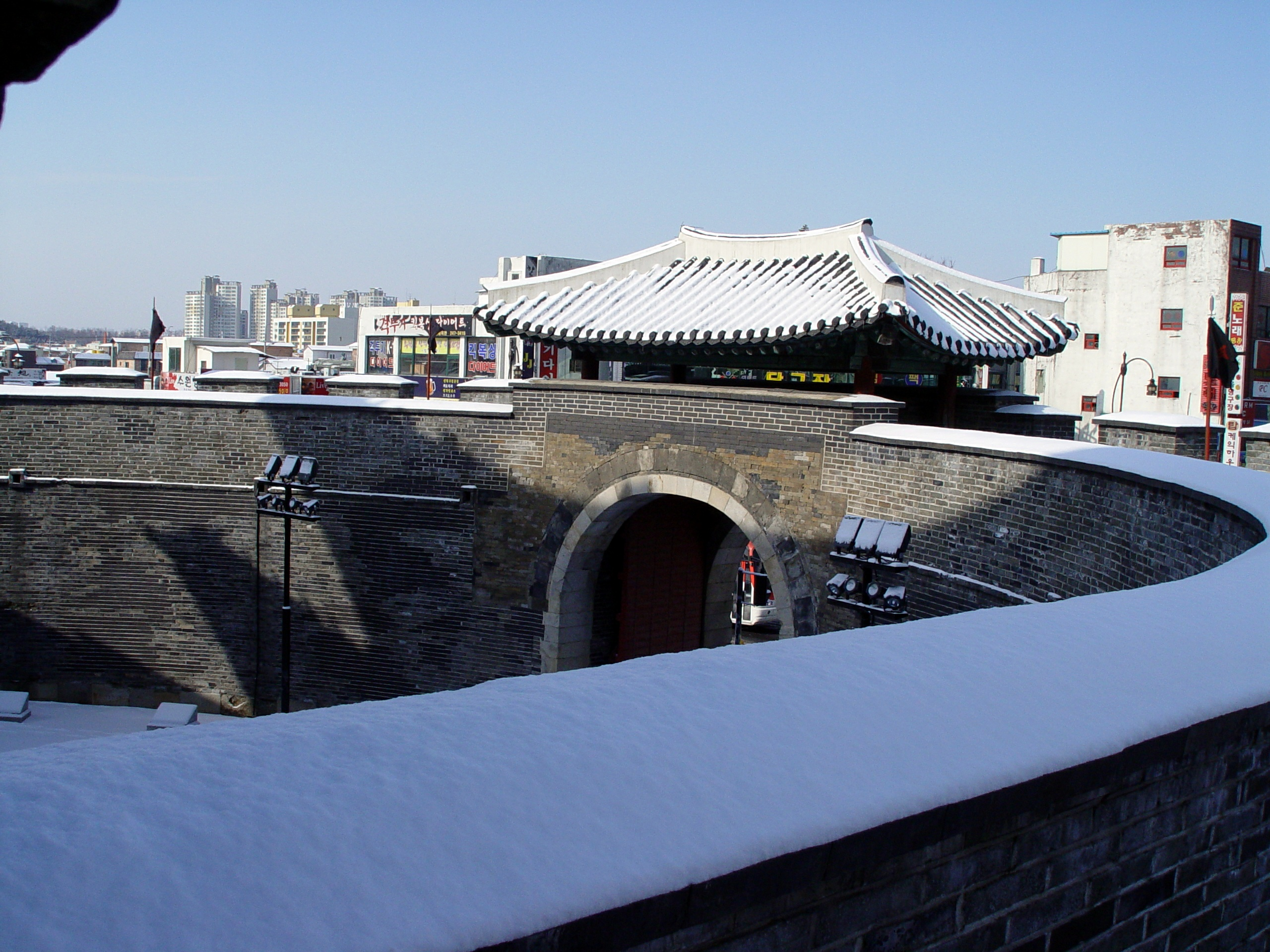
The ongseong

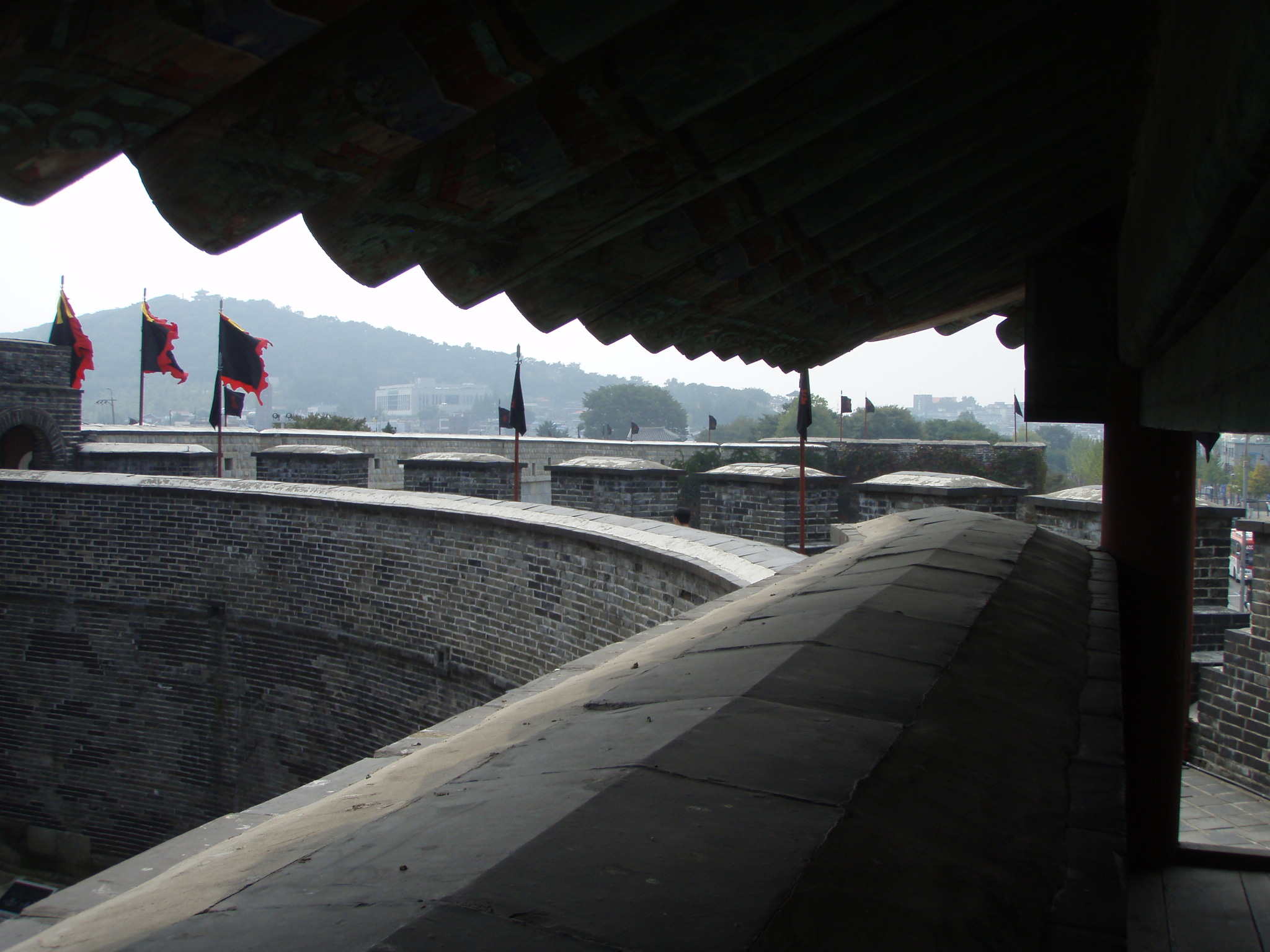
View from inside Janganmun

=== North-West Gate Guard Platform (북서적대) ===
37°17′19″N 127°00′49″E
Bukseo Jeokdae is a platform immediately to the west of Janganmun. It housed a cannon to protect the gate and its ongseong.

North-West Gate Guard Platform

=== North-West GunTower (북서포루) ===
37°17′14″N 127°00′44″E
Bukseo-GunTower is adjacent to Bukseo Jeokdae. Made from black bricks, it is divided into three storeys internally by boards. Firearms were secreted on these floors. The roof is unusual in design, being gabled on the inner side (towards the wall) and angled to the outer side (away from the wall). Construction was completed on September 24, 1794.

North-West GunTower

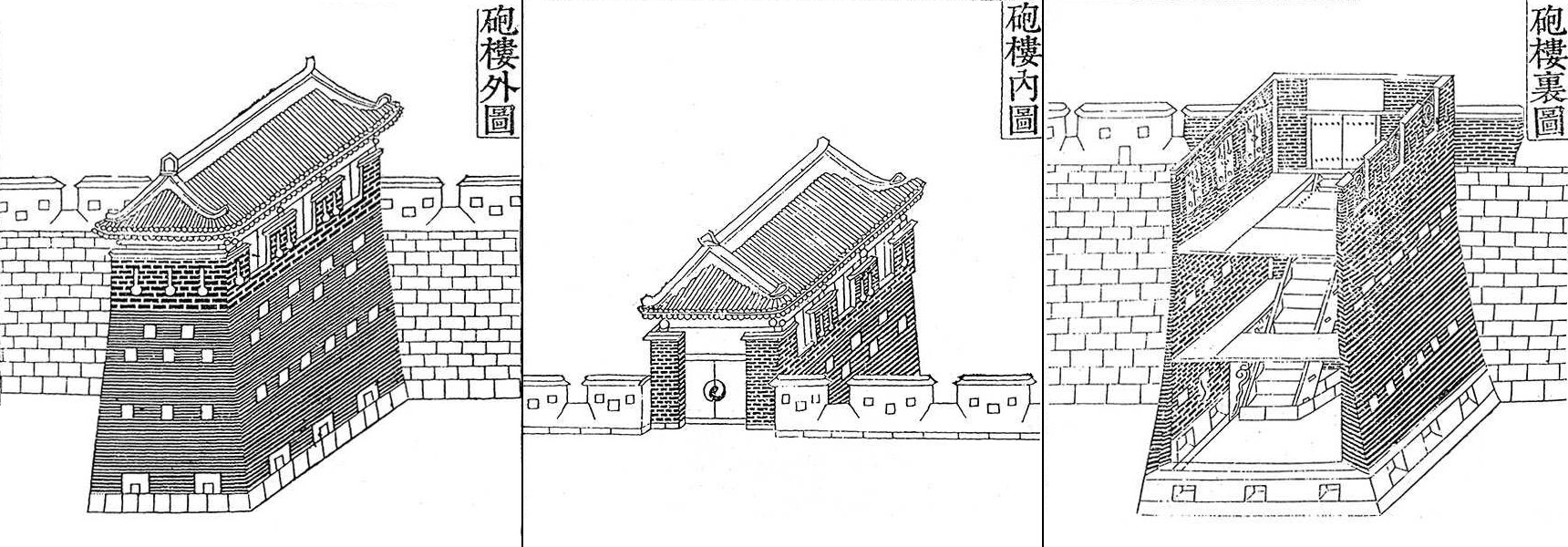
Uigwe picture

=== North Sentry Post (북포루) ===
37°17′14″N 127°00′44″E
Buk-SentryPost is another Sentry Post containing hidden firearms. This is closer to Hwaseomun than to Janganmun. Today a tourist information centre and public toilet stand on the north side of the structure. Construction was completed on February 20, 1795.

North Sentry Post

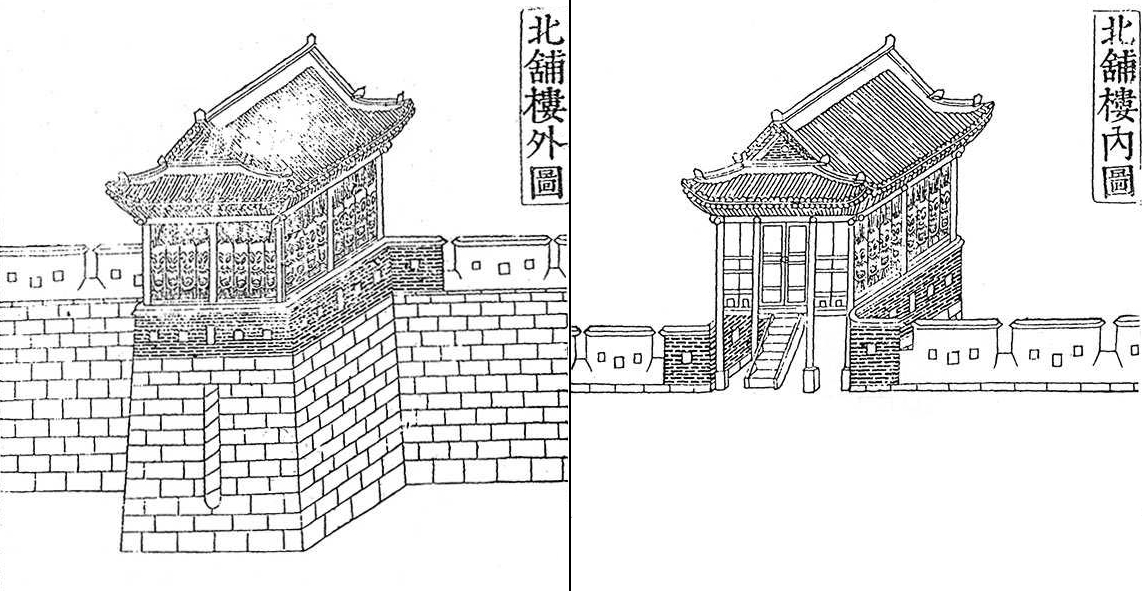
Uigwe picture

=== North-West Observation Tower (서북공심돈) ===
37°17′09″N 127°00′34″E
Seobuk Gongsimdon is an observation tower standing directly adjacent to Hwaseomun, giving it the obvious function of being a lookout post to protect the gate. Built from bricks on three sides, its inside is partitioned into three storeys with two wooden floors, from which soldiers could fire cannons and other firearms. It is said that, in 1797, on visiting Suwon, King Jeongjo claimed to his companions that this was the first gongsimdon in Korea. Its construction was completed on March 10, 1796.

=== West Gate (화서문) ===
37°17′08″N 127°00′35″E
Hwaseomun is the west gate to Hwaseong. Its stone base is capped with a one-storey wooden pavilion.

West Gate

=== North-West Pavilion (서북각루) ===
37°17′04″N 127°00′30″E
Seobuk Gangnu, facing a hill known as Sukjisan, is the lookout post immediately anti-clockwise from Hwaseomun. With less of a wide field of view than from the other side of the gate, it is shorter than the gongsimdon a short distance to the north-east. The pavilion's ground floor is fitted with an under-floor heating system.

North-West Pavilion

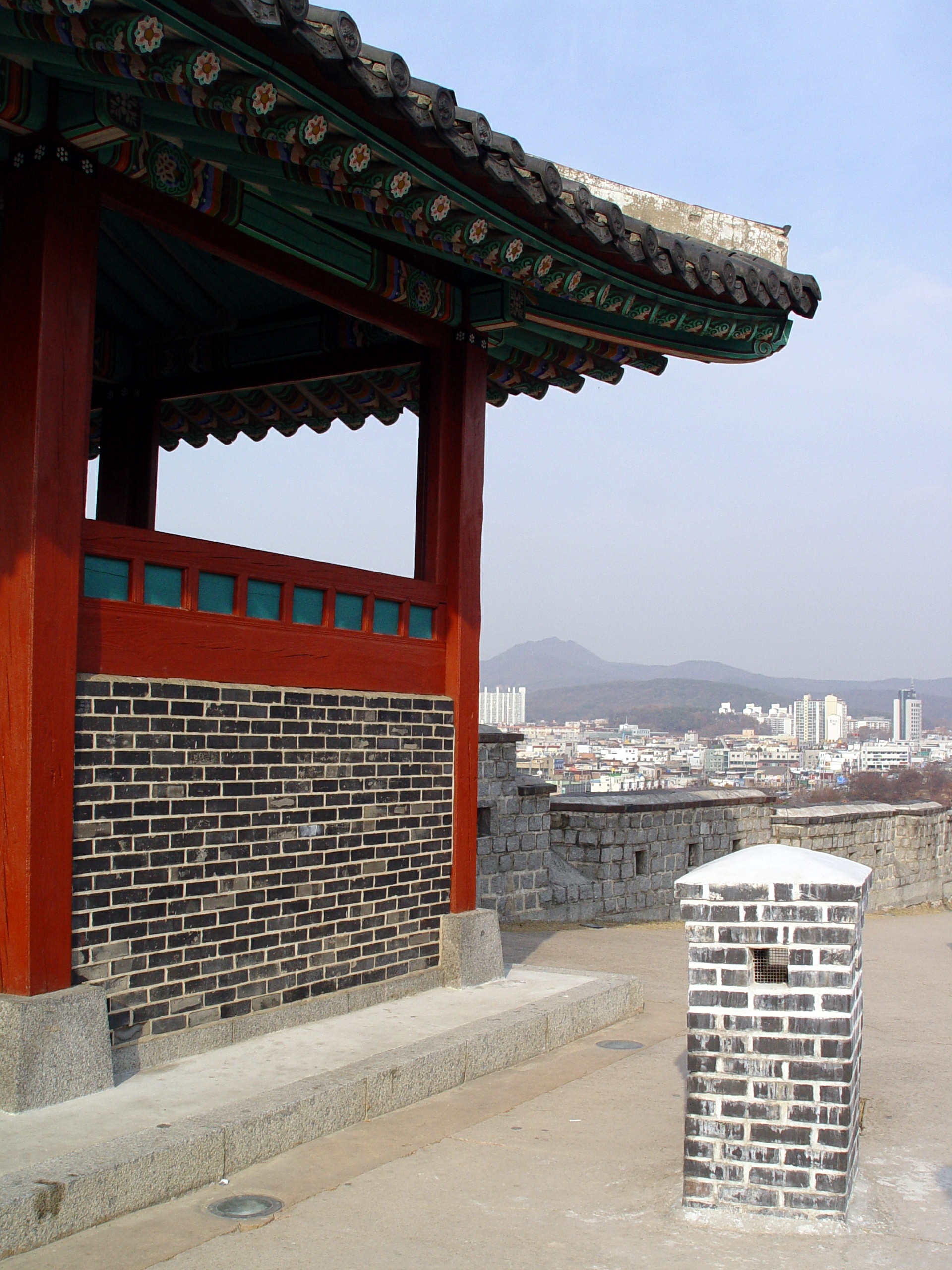
A corner of the pavilion

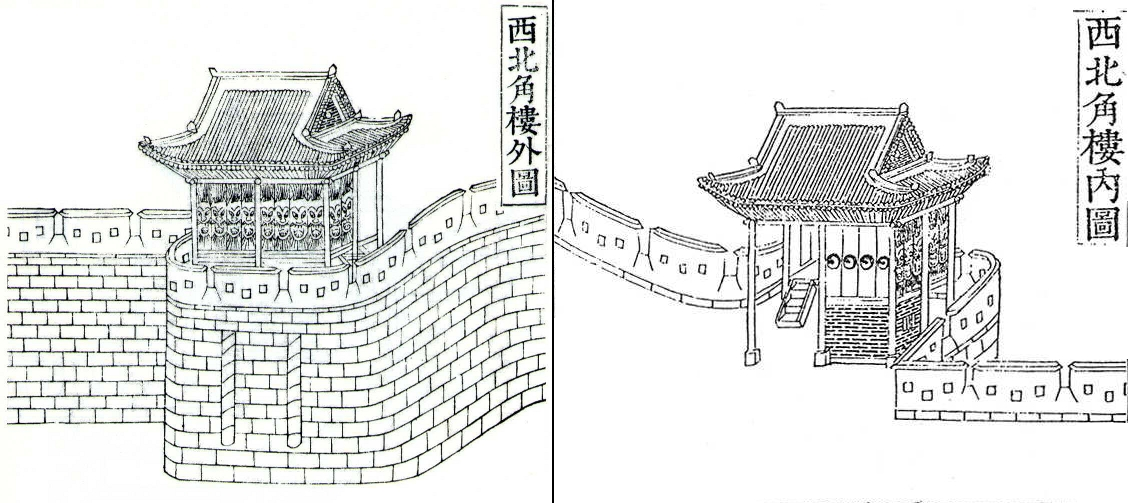
Uigwe picture

=== West Turret No. 1 (서일치) ===
37°17′02″N 127°00′29″E
Seo-il Chi, meaning West Turret 1, is a small bulge in the wall to allow soldiers to fire upon anyone attempting to scale Hwaseong from the outside.

West Turret No. 1

=== West GunTower (서포루) ===
37°16′57″N 127°00′31″E
Seo-GunTower sits partway up the hill named Paldalsan when heading anti-clockwise from Hwaseomun to Seojangdae. It controls the outskirts of Mount Paldal, and protects the Western Command Post (seojangdae). It was completed on May 30, 1796, and was one of Hwaseong's most heavily armed posts. This structure shall not be confused with the Seo-SentryPost.

West GunTower

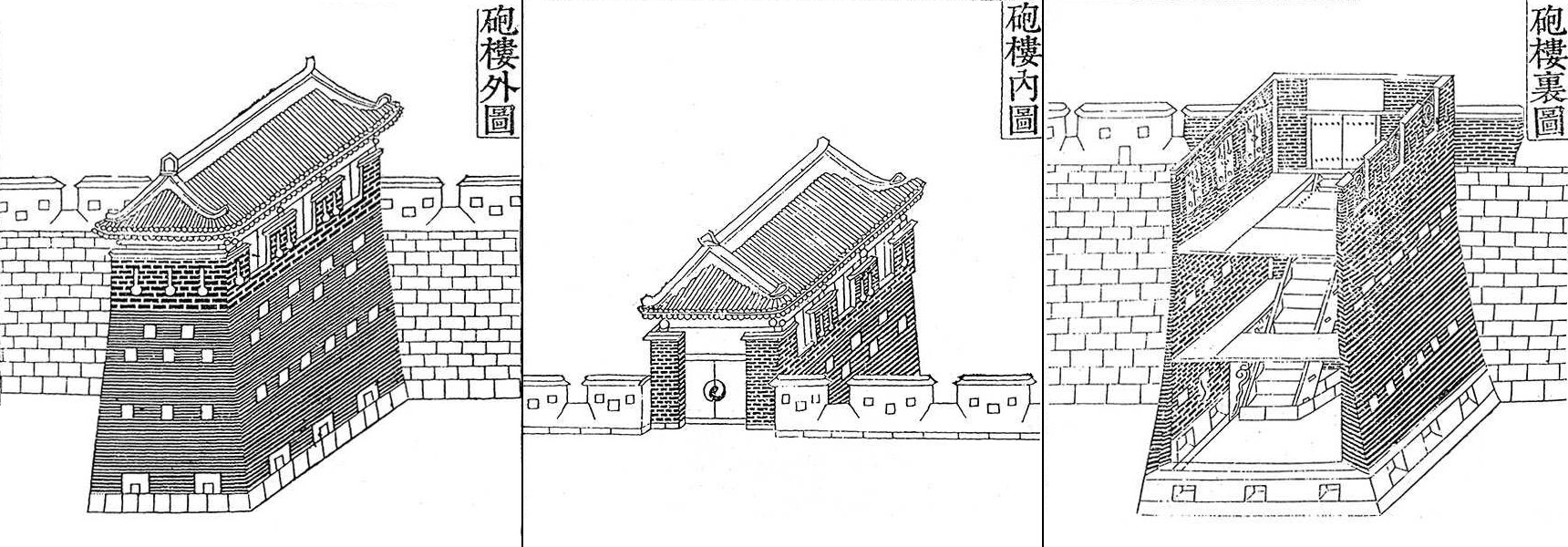
Uigwe picture

=== West Turret No. 2 (서이치) ===
37°16′54″N 127°00′34″E
Seo-i Chi, the second turret on the west of Hwaseong, stands just below Seonodae on the slopes of Paldalsan. Its purpose, as with any turret, was to provide a location to attack people trying to scale the walls.

West Turret No. 2

=== West Crossbow Platform (서노대) ===
37°16′51″N 127°00′36″E
Seonodae is an octagonal, steep-stepped, black brick platform directly adjacent to Seojangdae at the crest of Paldalsan when heading uphill from Hwaseomun. From here, archers could attack assailants in a wide range of directions and facing downhill, too.

West Crossbow Platform

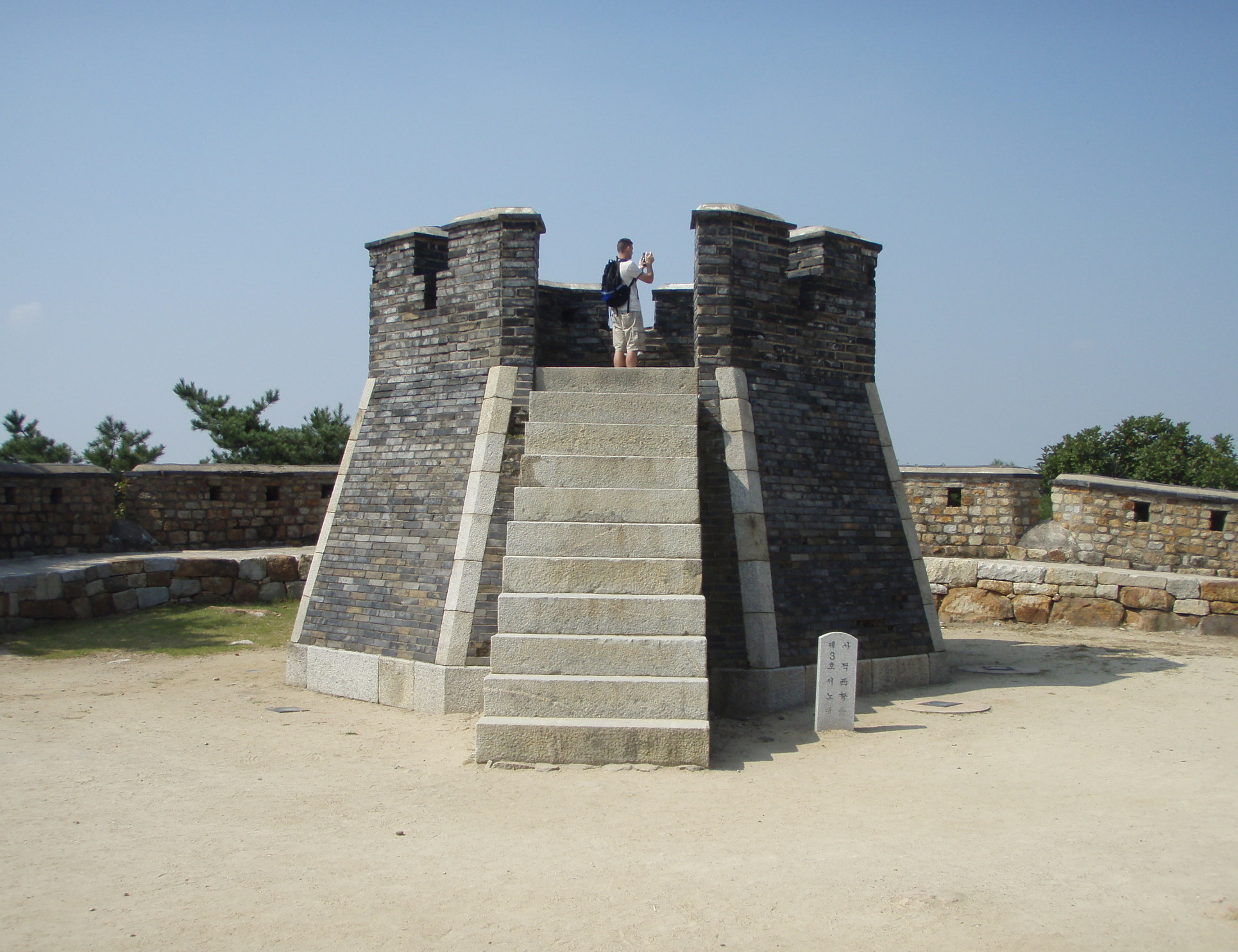
Seen from the front

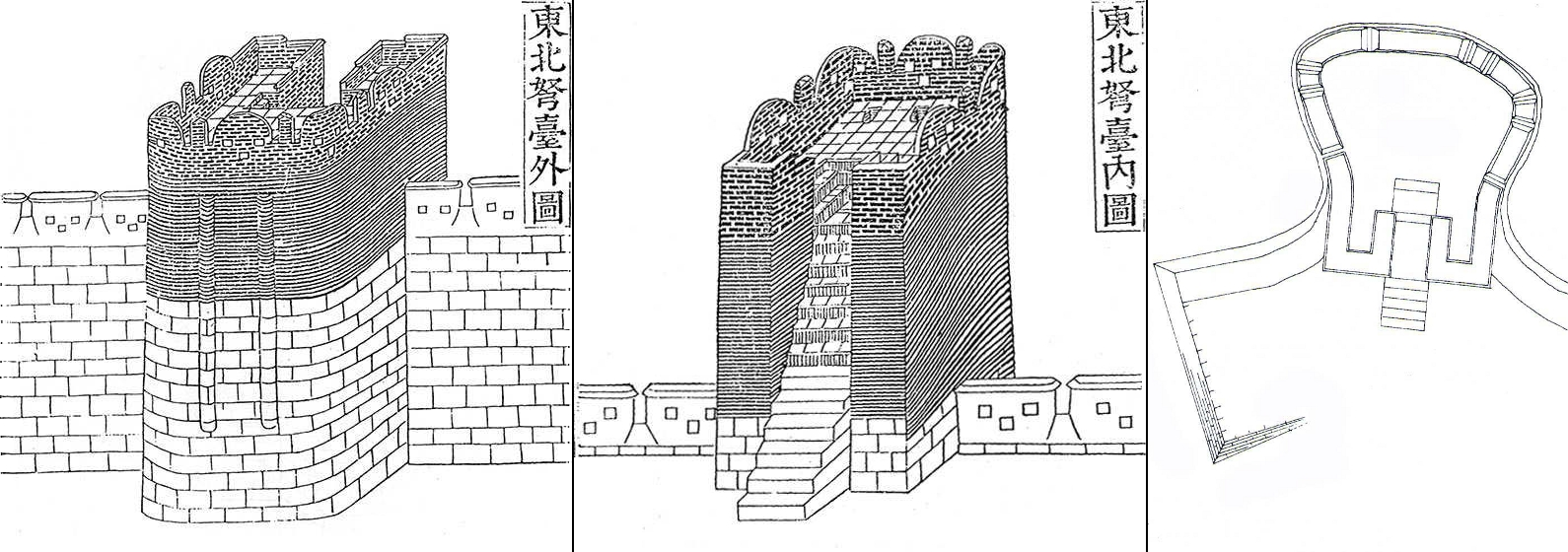
Uigwe picture

=== West Command Post (서장대) ===
37°16′51″N 127°00′36″E
Seojangdae, meaning western command post, sits atop Paldalsan, a small hill over which the higher section of Hwaseong runs. Seojangdae was destroyed by a fire in 1996 and was reconstructed afterwards. However, on May 1, 2006, an arsonist attacked Seojangdae. The arsonist reportedly caused the fire by lighting his clothes and underwear with a cigarette lighter. The fire caused about ₩6 billion in damage (about $6 million), destroying the upper floor of the watchtower. Seojangdae was reconstructed in 2007.

West Command Post

=== West Secret Gate (서암문) ===
37°16′49″N 127°00′36″E
Seoammun, the West Secret Gate, lies 50 metres (164 ft) south of Seojangdae. Sitting on a forested part of the ridge of the hill Paldalsan, it was designed to provide access in and out under cover. Today, it is easily accessible from the road outside, being located near Jindallae (Azalea) Public Toilets.

West Secret Gate

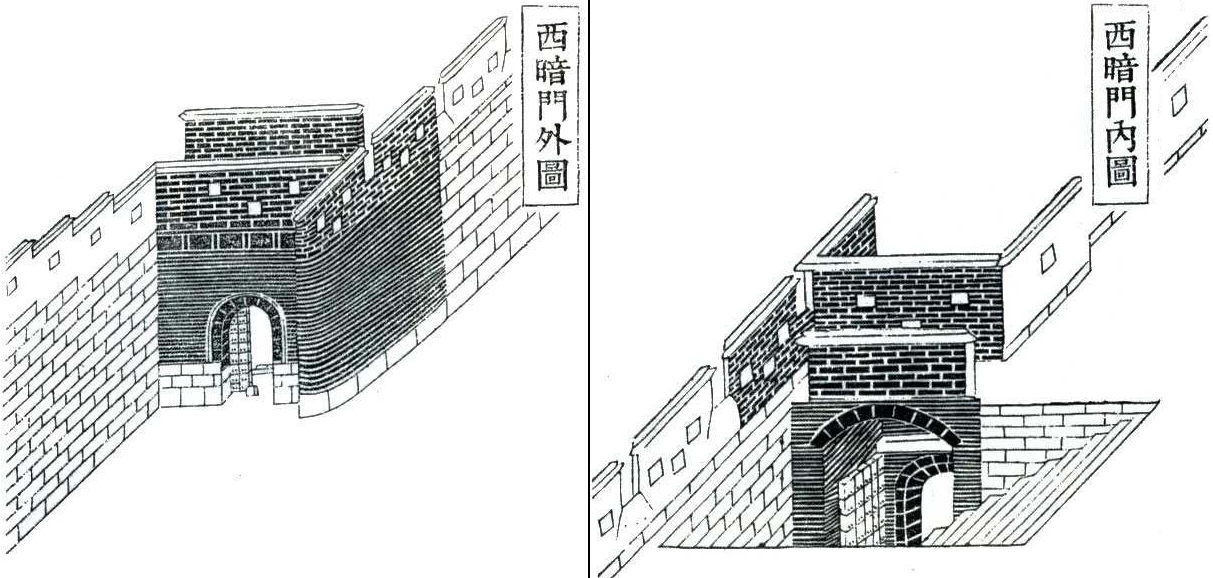
Uigwe picture

=== West Sentry Post (서포루) ===
37°16′45″N 127°00′35″E
Seo-SentryPost sits on a turret projecting from the wall 140 metres (459 ft). It controls and protects the West Secret Gate that sits immediately southwards. The structure was completed on August 18, 1796. This structure shall not be confused with the Seo-GunTower, which sits on the other side of Seojangdae.

West Sentry Post

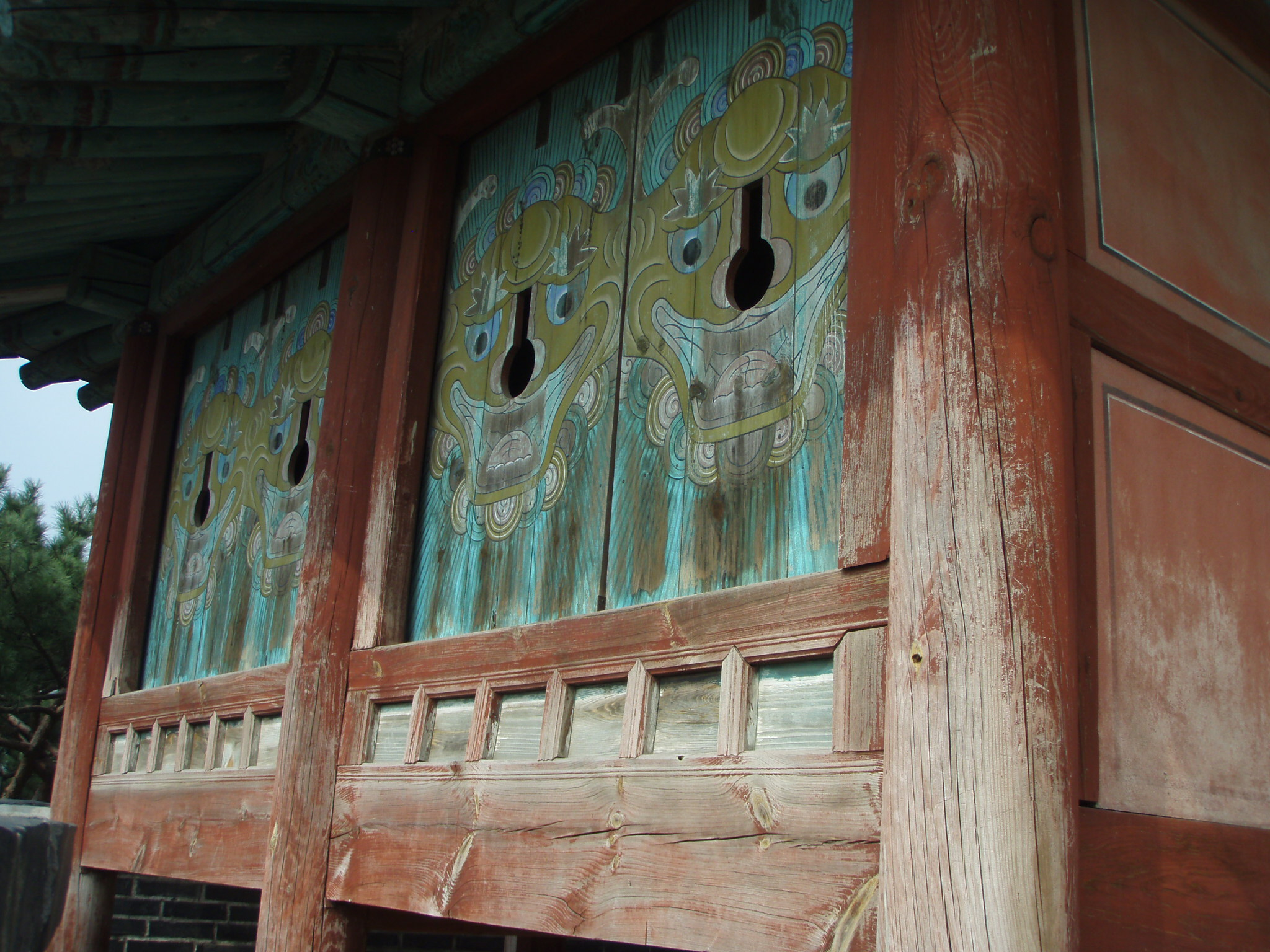
Panelling

=== West Turret No. 3 (서삼치) ===
37°16′39″N 127°00′39″E
Seosam Chi, the third western turret, has the same function as the other nine turrets around Hwaseong. It sits just north of the south-western spur.

West Turret No. 3

=== South-West Secret Gate (서남암문) ===
37°16′38″N 127°00′42″E
Seonam Ammun is the beginning of a path to Seonam Gangnu, the south-western pavilion. The gate used to contain a house known as a posa, and Seonam Posa, the south-western posa, sat above the gate, enabling soldiers to keep watch and issue alerts.

South-West Secret Gate

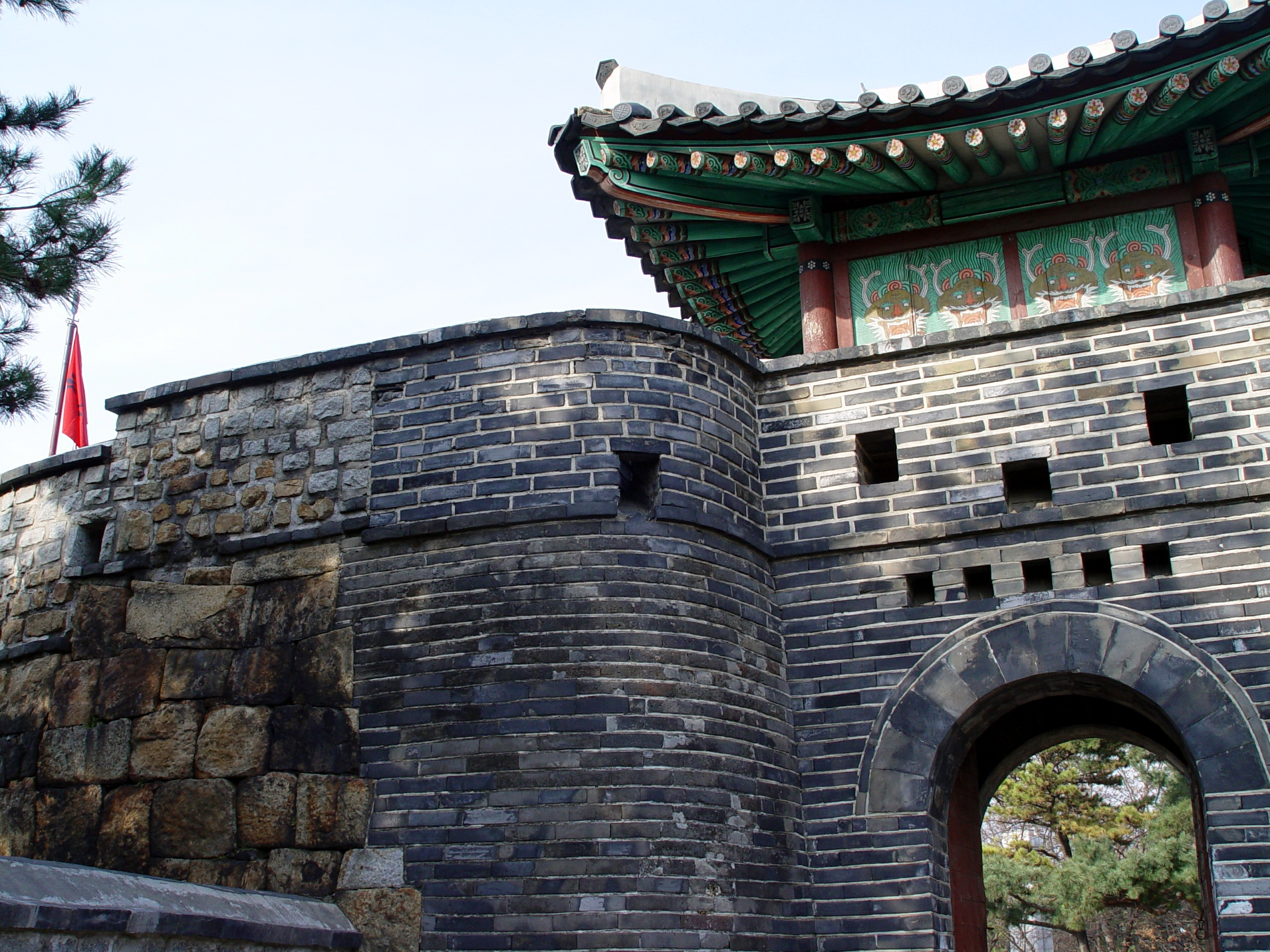
Seen from the spur (Original wall visible)

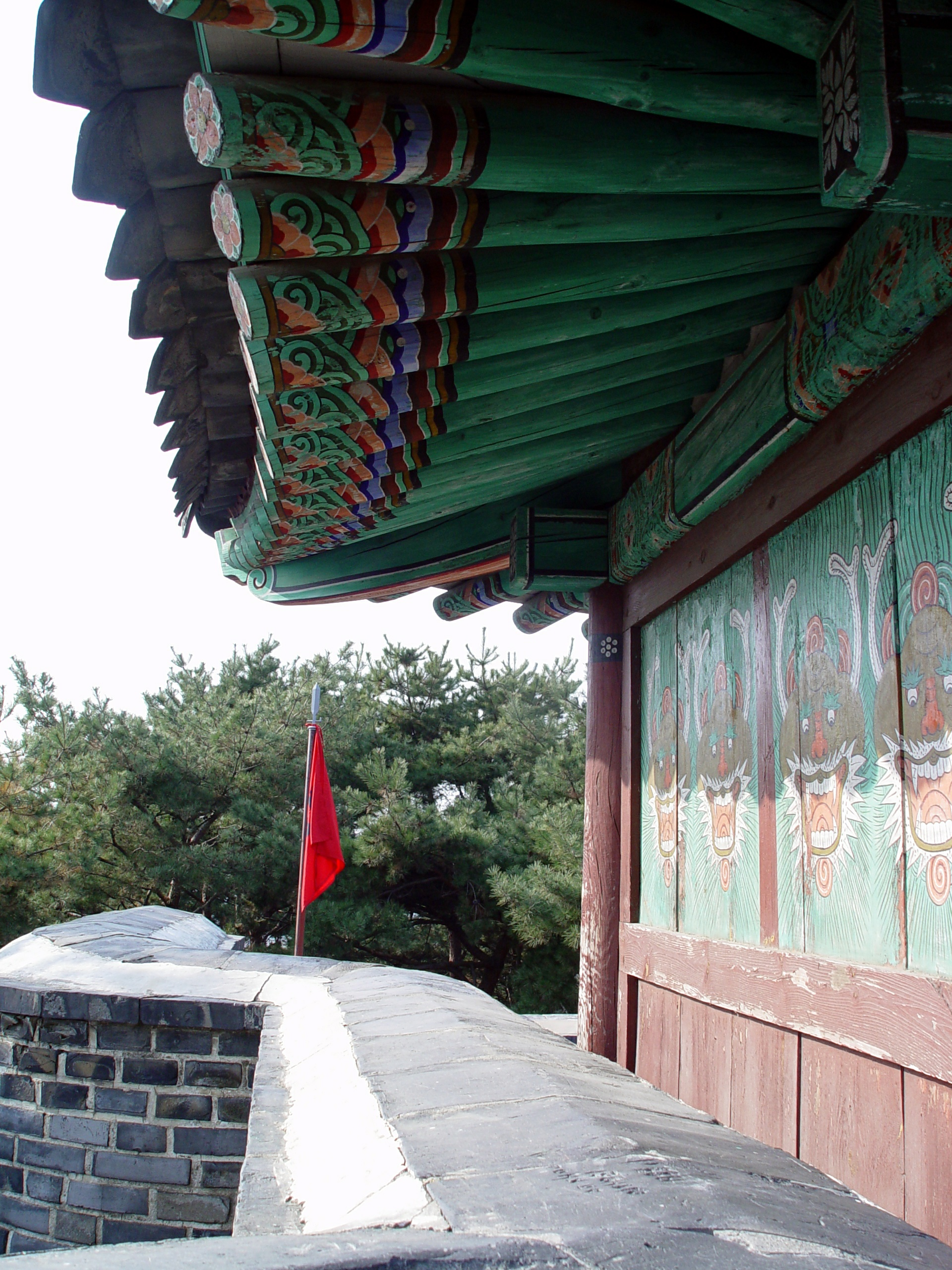
The upper section

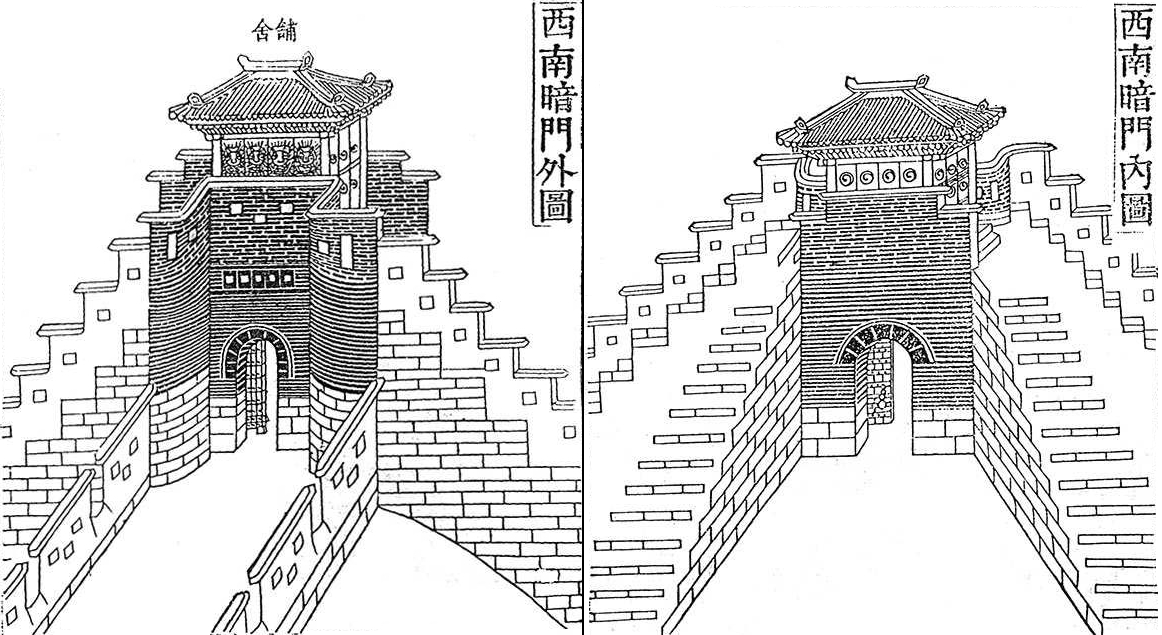
Uigwe picture

=== South-West Spur (용도) ===
37°16′35″N 127°00′43″E
In order to control the ridge along the Mount Paldal, Hwaseong fortress has a spur known as Yongdo. It branches from the main ring at Seonam Ammun, at the top of the hill, runs to the south-west end of Mount Paldal and arrives at the South-West Pavilion, Seonam Gangnu, also known as Hwayangnu. Nowadays this spur provides a large view over the town, including the Suwon Station.

South-West Spur

=== South-West Spur's Western Turret (용도서치) ===
37°16′34″N 127°00′44″E
Two turrets are situated midway along the south-west spur from the South-West Secret Gate to the South-West Pavilion. On the right when coming from the Secret Gate, the South-West Turret 1 (Seonamilchi 서남일치) extends to the West and overlooks the city of Suwon towards Seoho. It is also called South-West Spur's Western Turret (용도서치).

South-West Spur's Western Turret

=== South-West Pavilion (서남각루) ===
37°16′32″N 127°00′44″E
Seonam Gangnu, also called Hwayangnu, lies at the end of the spur from Seonam Ammun, from which a lot of Suwon can be seen, including Suwon Station.

South-West Pavilion

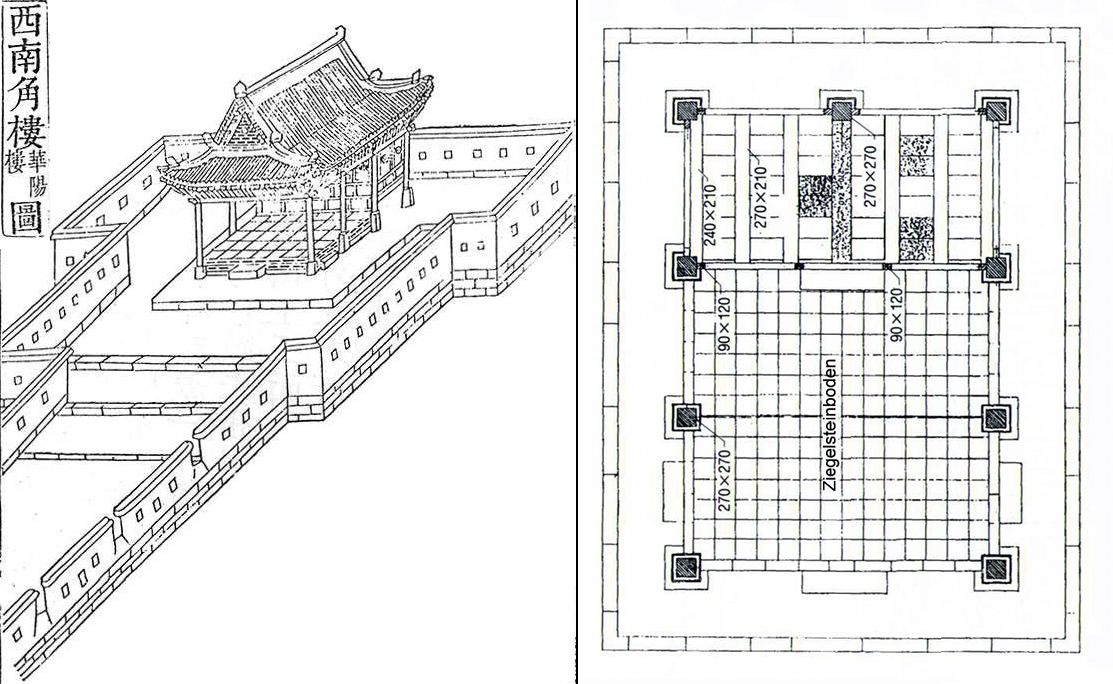
Uigwe picture

=== South-West Spur's Eastern Turret (용도동치) ===
37°16′35″N 127°00′44″E
Two turrets are situated midway along the south-west spur from the South-West Secret Gate to the South-West Pavilion. On the right when coming from the South-West Pavilion, the South-West Turret 2 (Seonamichi 서남이치) extends to the East and overlooks the wall towards Paldalmun (though this cannot be seen nowadays as the hill has become thickly forested). It is also called South-West Spur's Eastern Turret (용도동치).

South-West Spur's Eastern Turret

=== South GunTower (남포루) ===
37°16′38″N 127°00′48″E
Nam-GunTower sits between the Spur and the South Turret, and controls the outskirts of the Fortress, especially near Paddalmun..

South GunTower

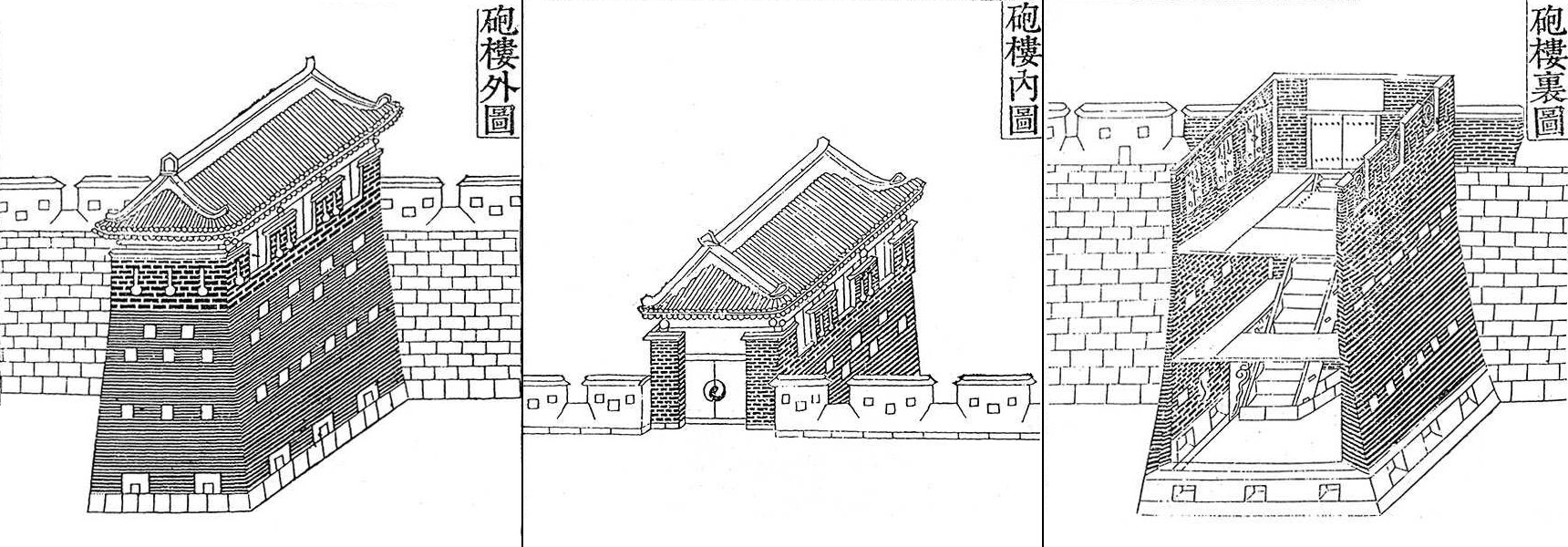
Uigwe picture

=== South Turret (남치) ===
37°16′38″N 127°00′52″E
Nam Chi, the southern turret, juts out from the wall on the slopes of Paldalsan uphill from Paldalmun yet below Nam Poru.

South Turret

=== South-West Gate Guard Platform (남서적대) ===
Both the south and north gates originally had guard platforms to either side. Today, only those beside the north gate remain.

== Haenggung (행궁) ==
37°16′54″N 127°00′49″E
Haenggung, meaning detached palace, is a palace built within the walls of Hwaseong to house King Jeongjo when he was away from his palace in Seoul worshipping at his father's tomb. When he was not in residence it was used by his delegated official as a base of government. Haenggung was also used for a 60th birthday party for King Jeongjo's mother, Princess Hong of Hyegyeonggung, elderly citizens' feasts and national exams.

The palace was built in 1789, but was expanded between 1794 and 1796 to house 600 compartments and in doing so became the largest haenggung in Korea.

Haenggung is a collection of 22 buildings, excluding the servants' quarters, arranged in an approximately rectangular layout at the eastern foot of Paldalsan, the small hill on which the western side of Hwaseong stands. The entrance to the palace from the centre of town is the main gate, Sinpungnu, known as Jinnamnu when it was constructed in 1790 but renamed five years later under King Jeongjo's orders.

Most of the palace, with the notable exception of Nangnamheon, was destroyed under the Japanese colonial period. Restoration work began in 1996 and the palace opened to the public in October 2003.

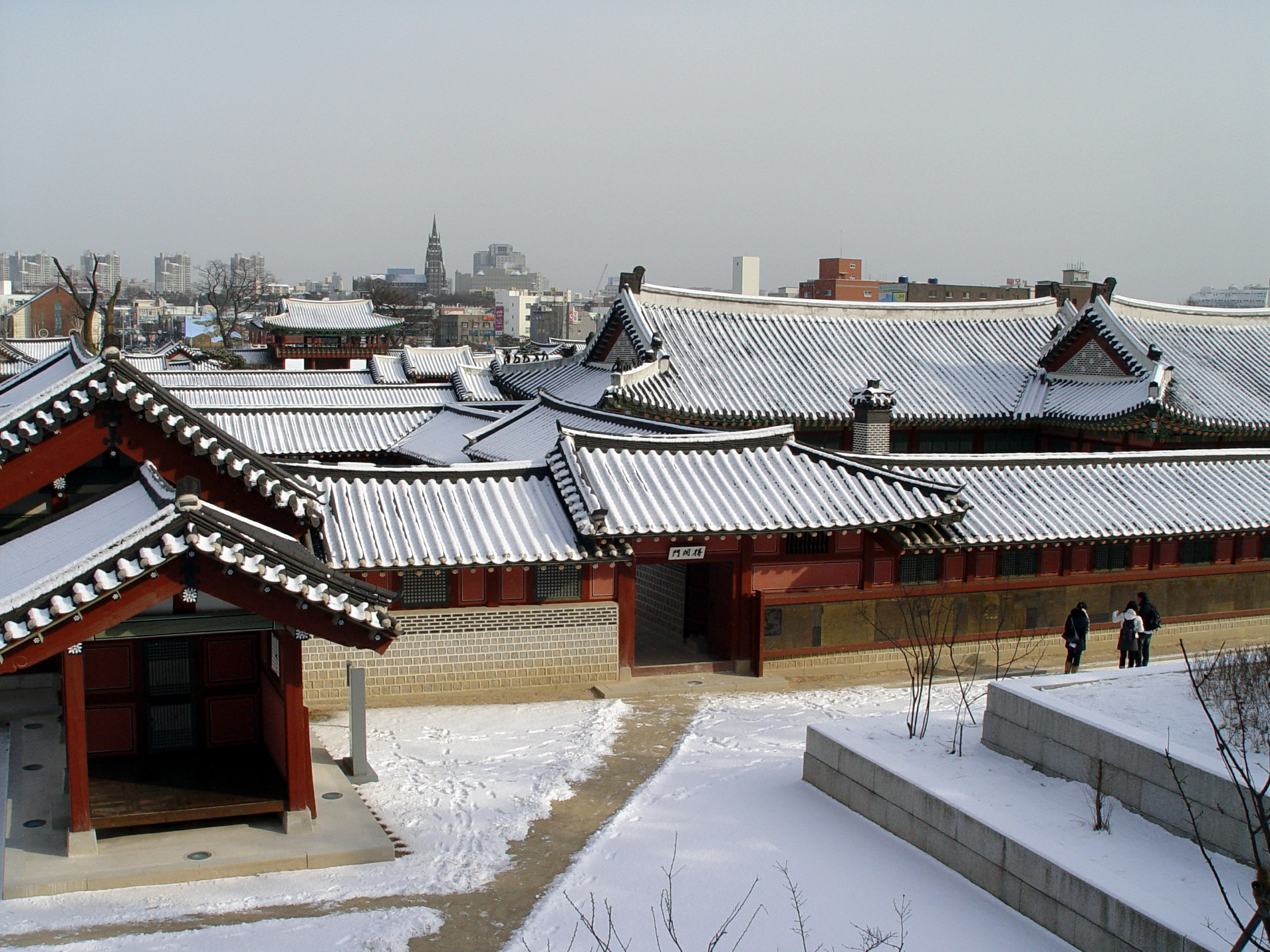
Haenggung seen from near Naeposa

There is a three-storey tourist information centre and exhibition hall and 3D theatre outside the front entrance of Haenggung. It is open from 9 a.m. to 6 p.m.

The main structures within the palace are listed as follows.

=== Sinpungnu (신풍루) ===
37°16′55″N 127°00′52″E
Sinpung means new home town, indicating that the main gate of Haenggung was named to reflect King Jeongjo's affection for Suwon.

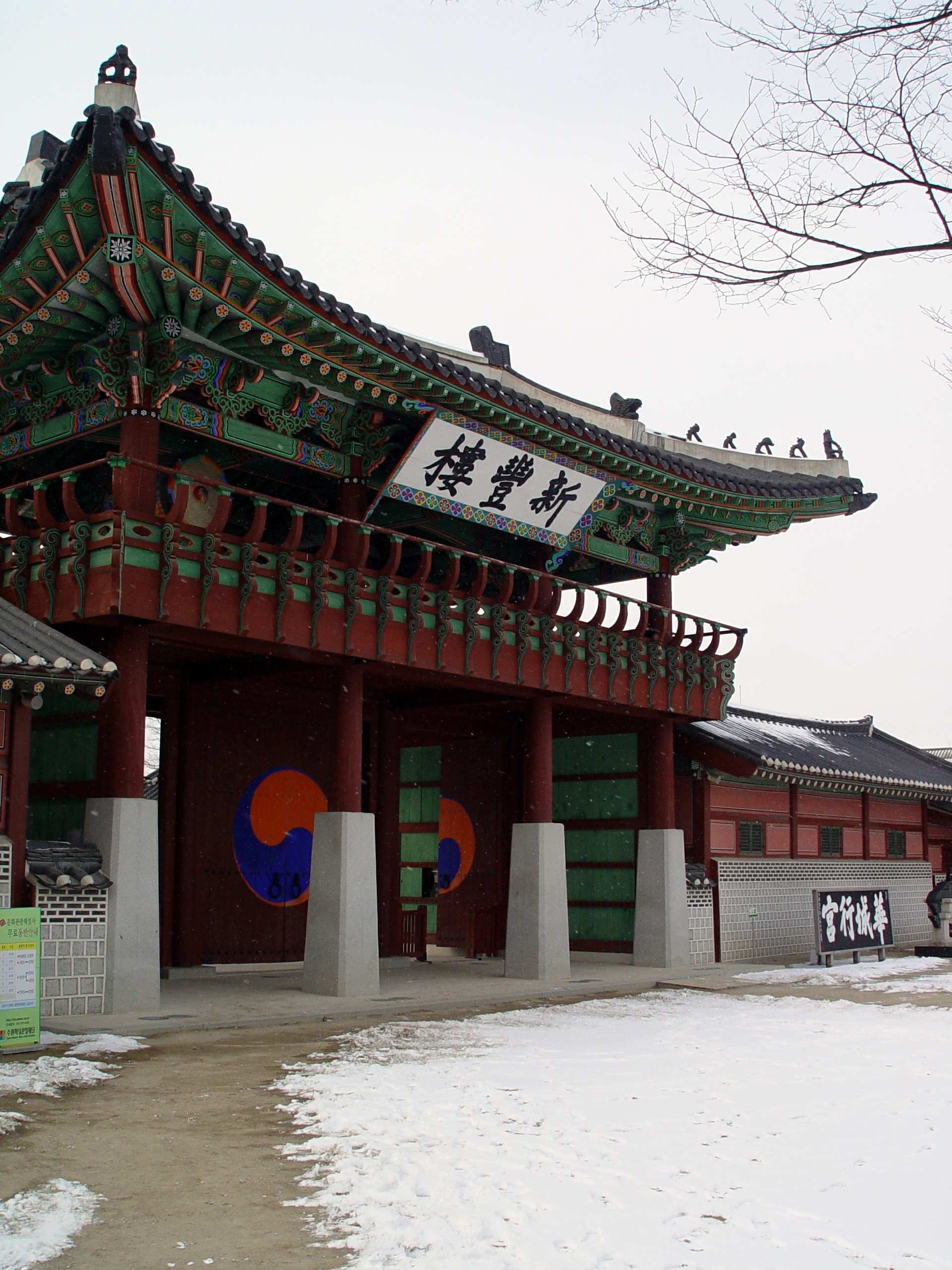
The east face

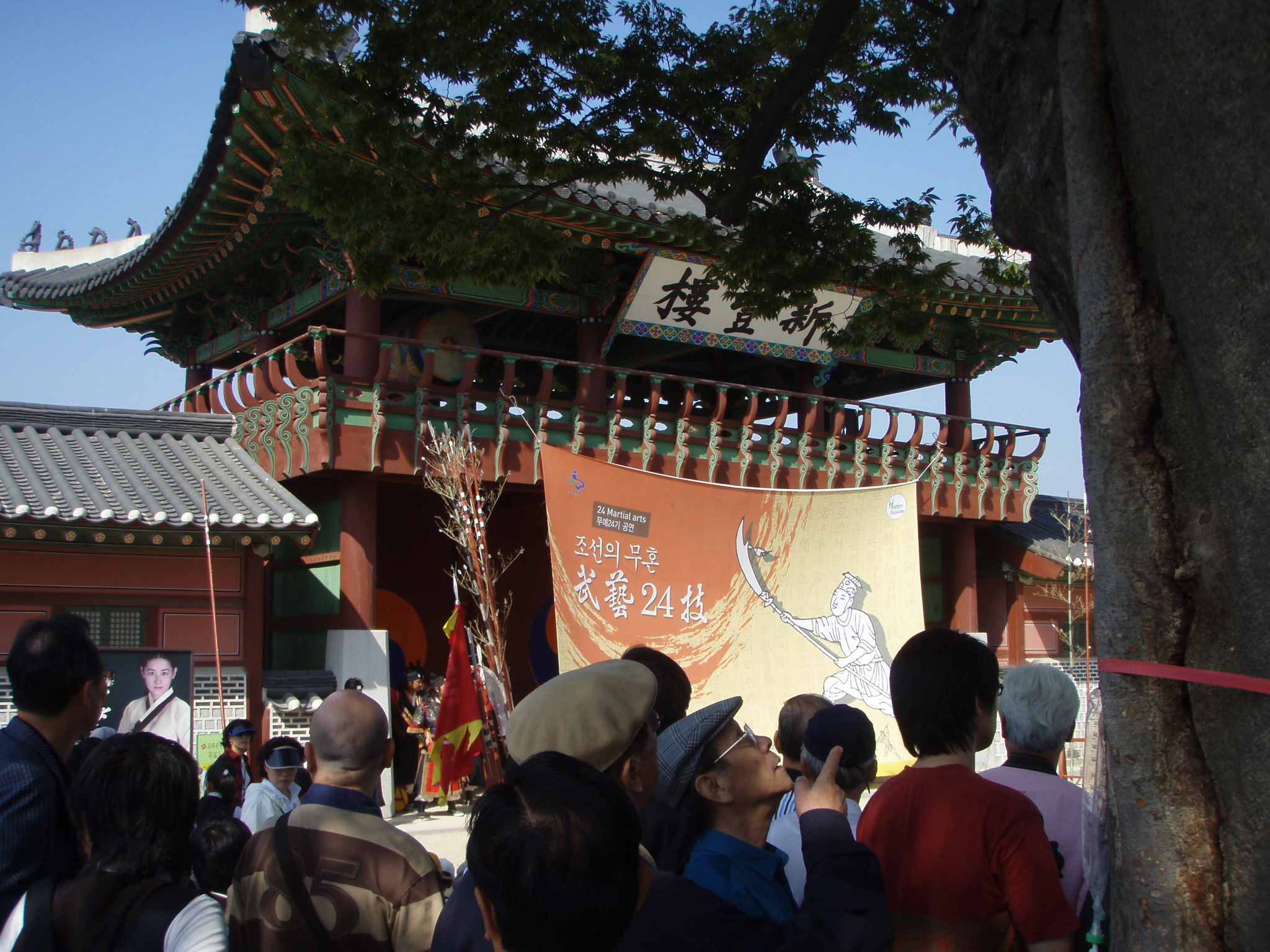
During a festival

=== Gyeongnyonggwan (경룡관) ===
This is the entrance to Jangnakdang, and means great dragon representing an empire.

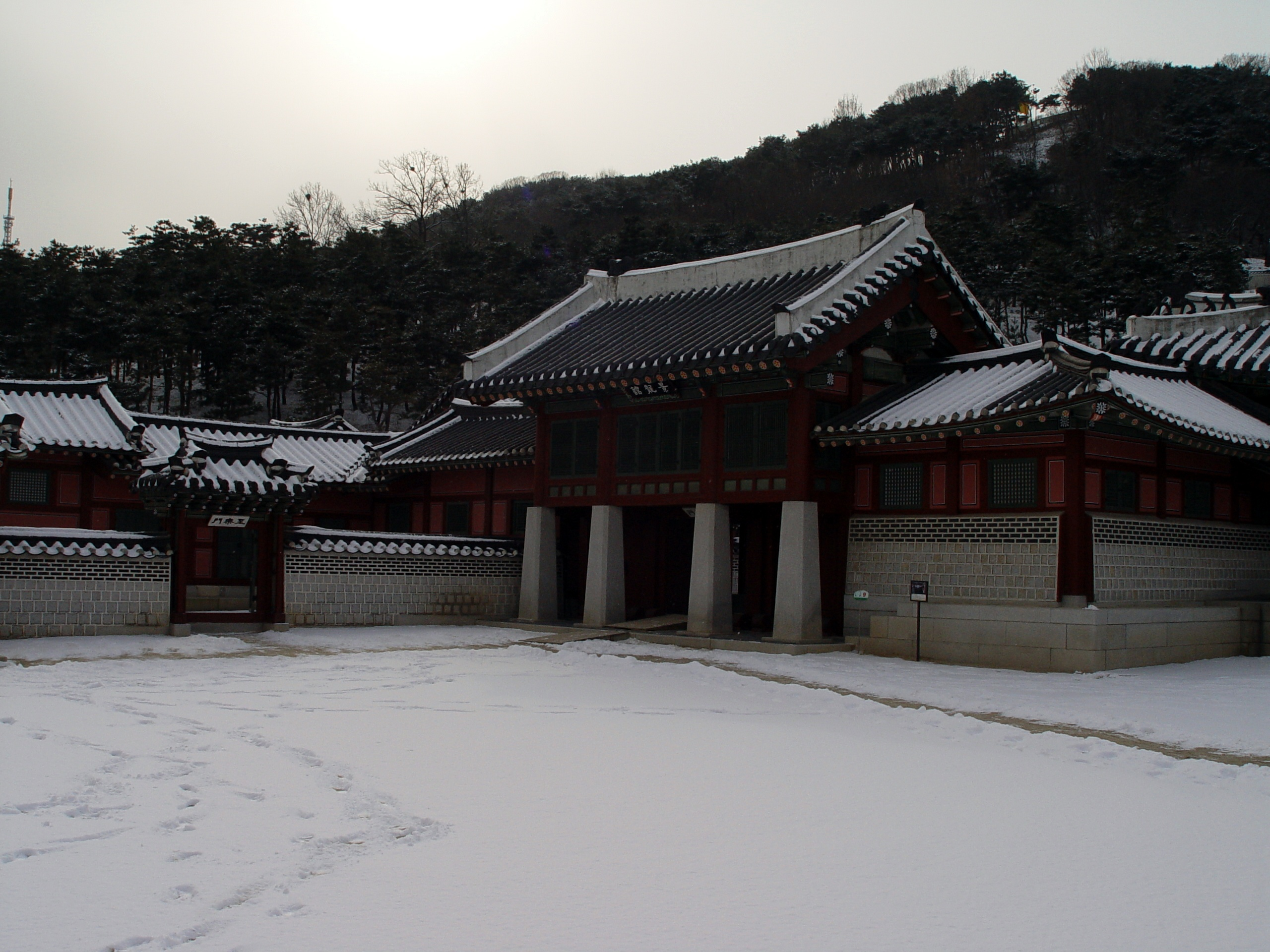
The east face

=== Bongnaedang (복내당) ===
These were the main quarters of Haenggung, so the yusu families resided here most of the time.

=== Nangnamheon (낙남헌) ===
The state examinations and banquet for the poor (on the occasion of Lady Hong's 61st birthday) were held here.

=== Yuyeotaek (유여택) ===
King Jeongjo used this building to speak with his subjects.

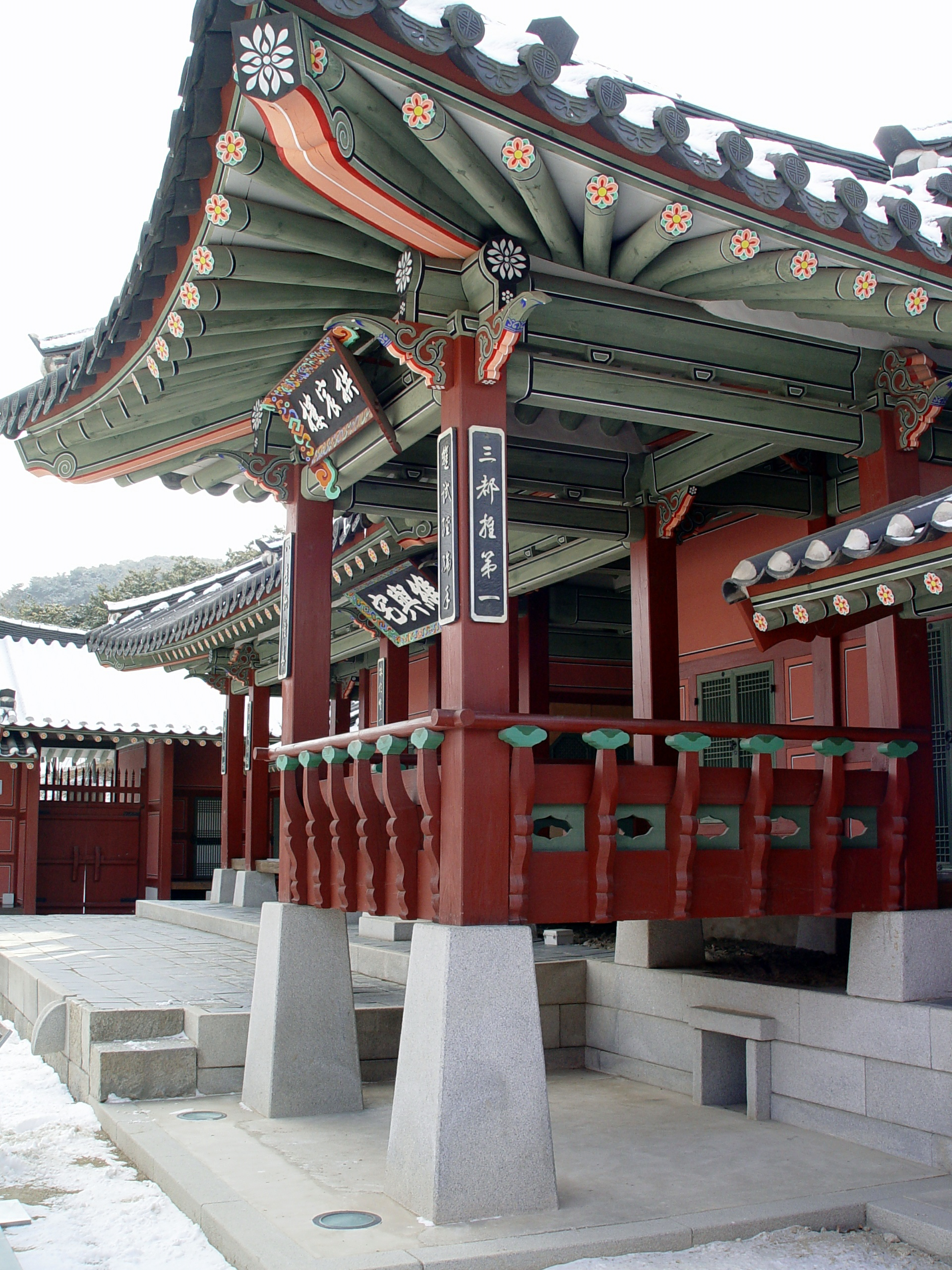
The east side

=== Bongsudang (봉수당) ===
This building was used to celebrate the 61st birthday of Lady Hong.

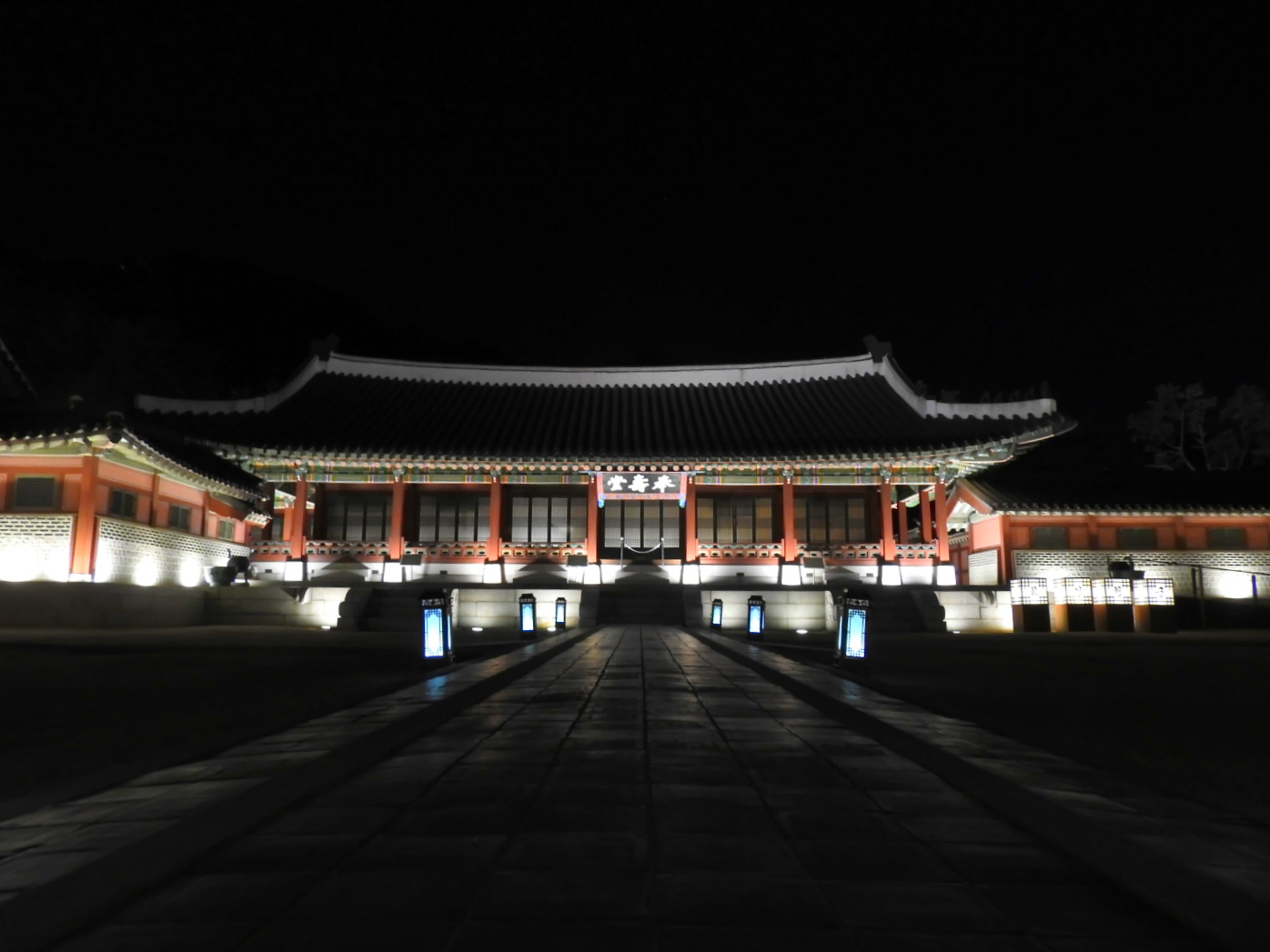
Nighttime view of Bongsudang

=== Jangnakdang (장낙당) ===
This was King Jeongjo's bedroom in Haenggung. He prayed to Lady Hong for longevity here.

=== Deukjungjeong (득중정) ===
This was where King Jeongjo practised archery. The name implies that the king hit the bull's eye on every occasion.

=== Noraedang (노래당) ===
This structure was built as the king dreamt of abdicating the throne and retiring to Suwon in old age.

=== Oejeongniso (외정리소) ===
Events were held here to celebrate the arrival of the kings.

=== Jwaikmun (좌익문 左翊門) ===
This is the gate between the first two courtyards after entering Haenggung through Sinpungnu.

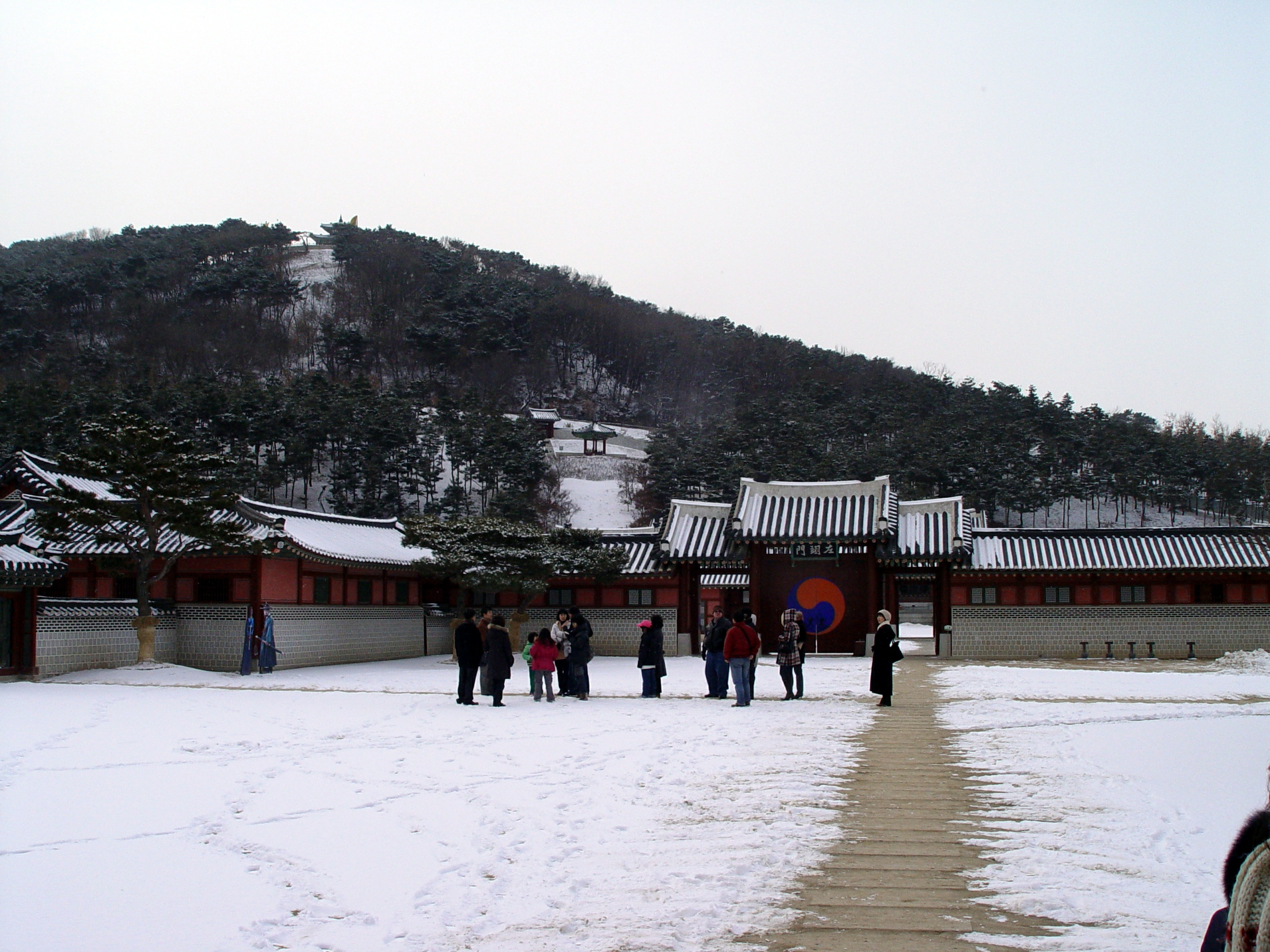
Seen from near Sinpungnu

=== Jungyangmun (중양문) ===
This is the gate between the second and third courtyards after entering Haenggung through Sinpungnu and continuing through Jwaingmun.

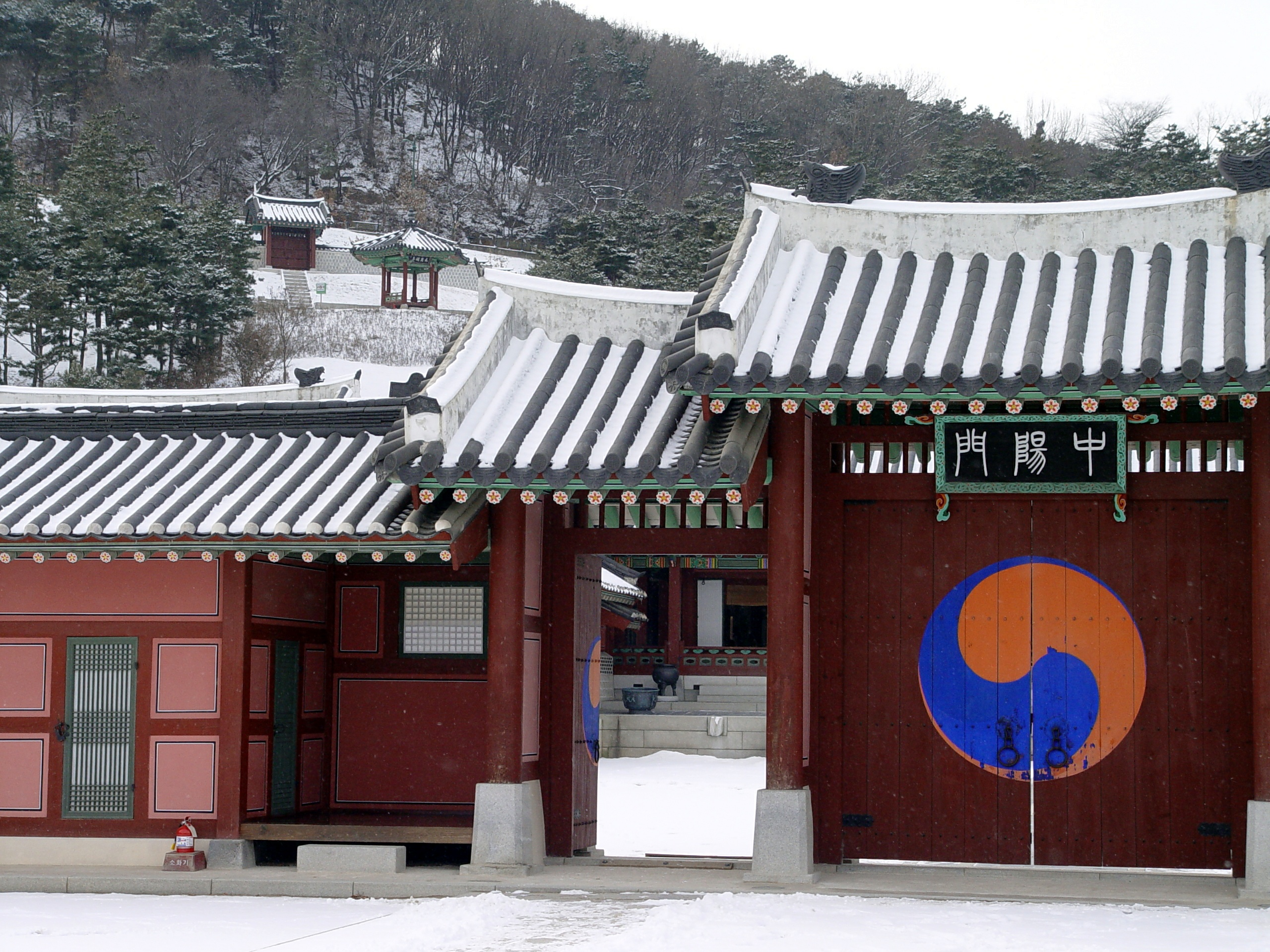
The east side seen from near Jwaikmun

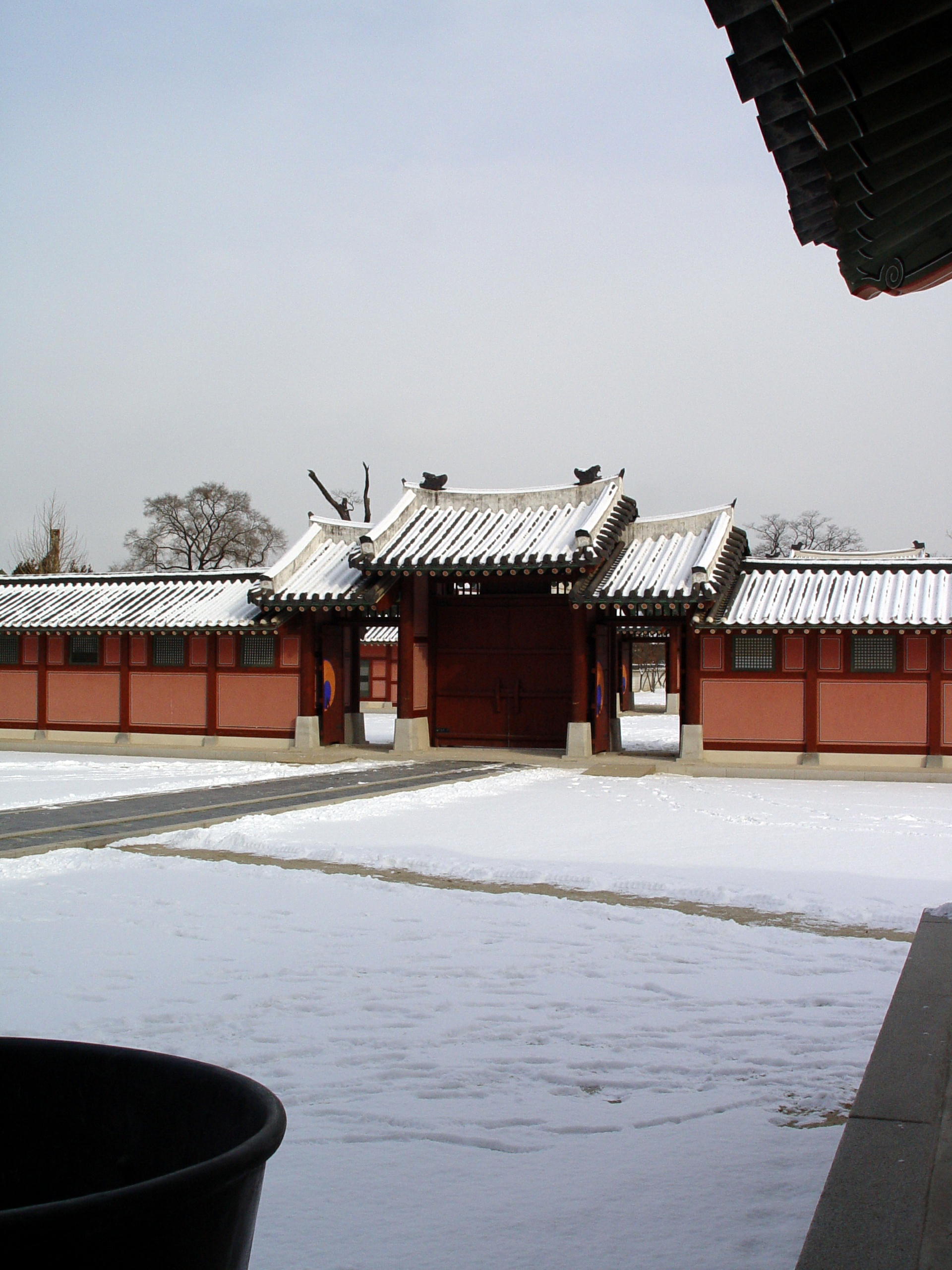
The west side seen from Gyeongnyonggwan

=== Daeseungwon (대승원) ===
This Buddhist temple is situated between Seojangdae and Haenggung Palace.

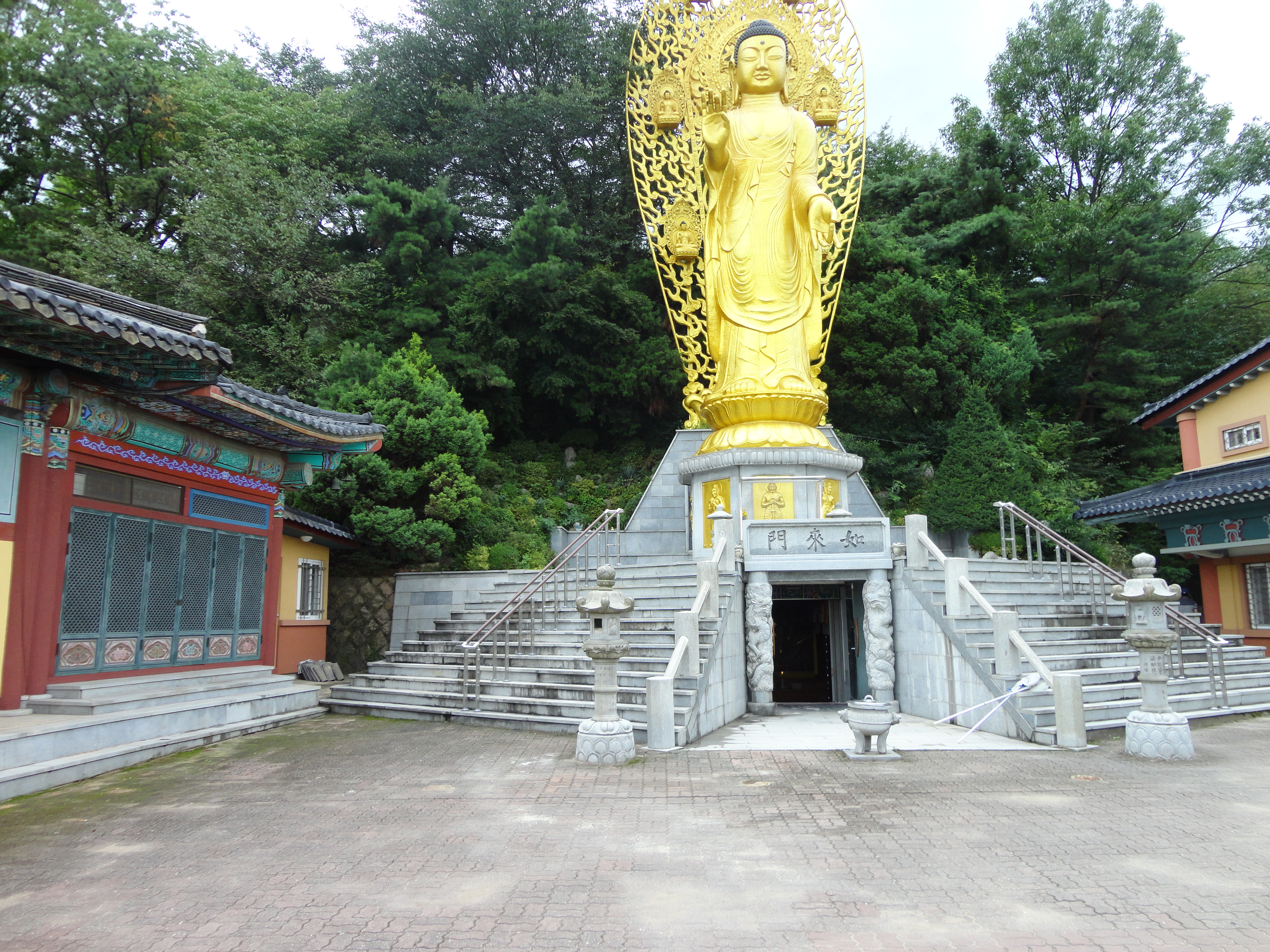
Front view

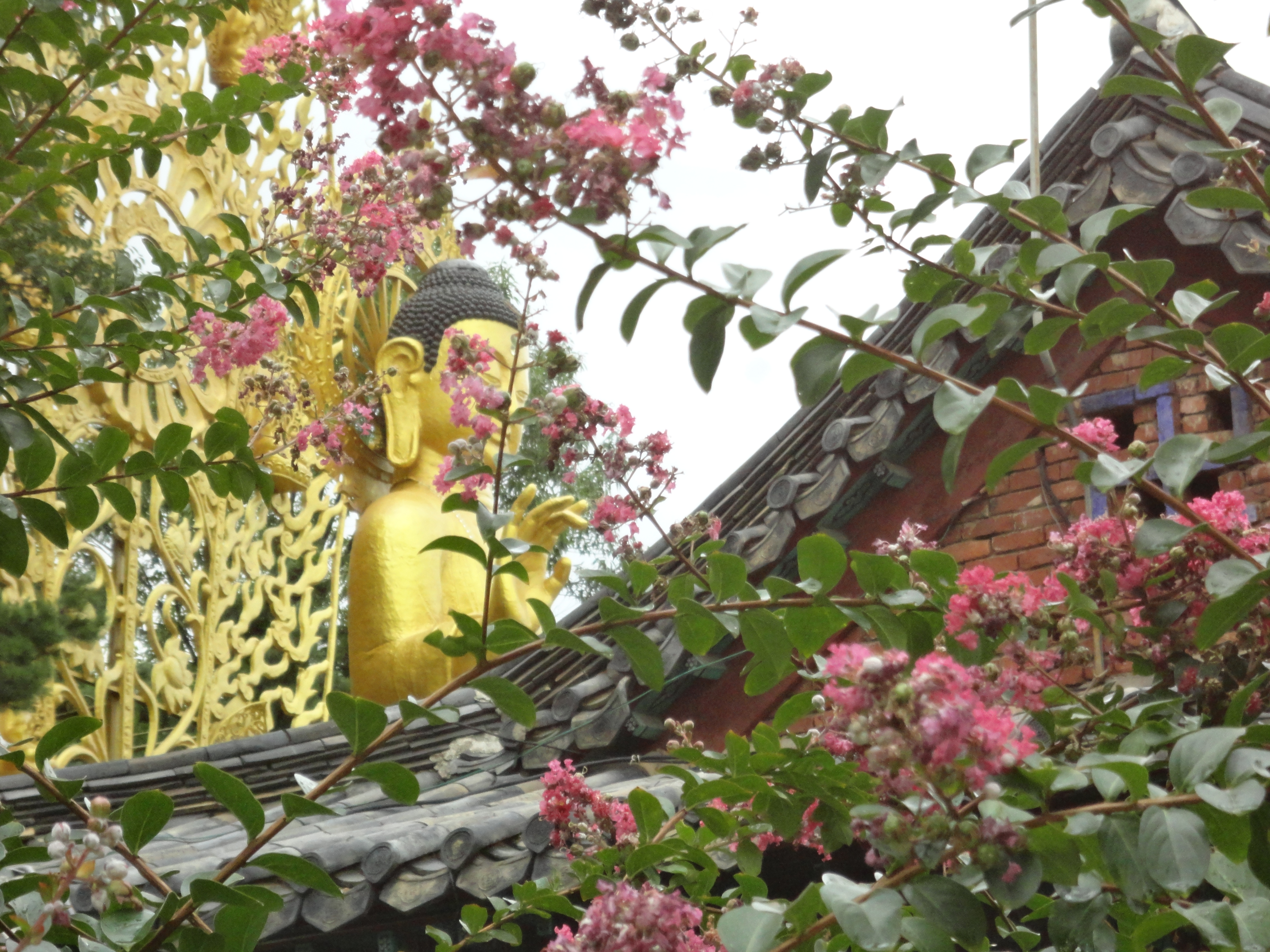
Side view

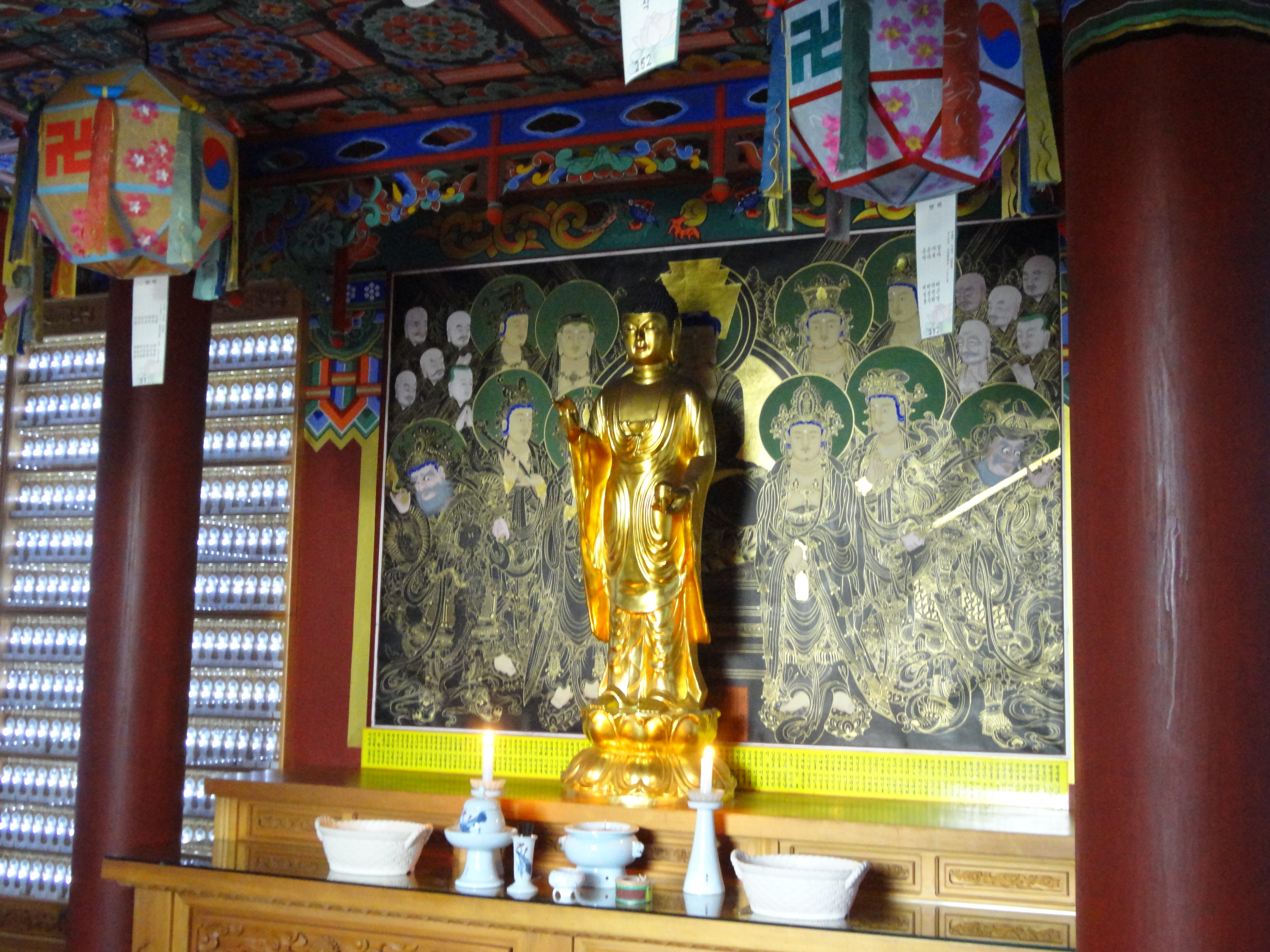
Temple below the statue

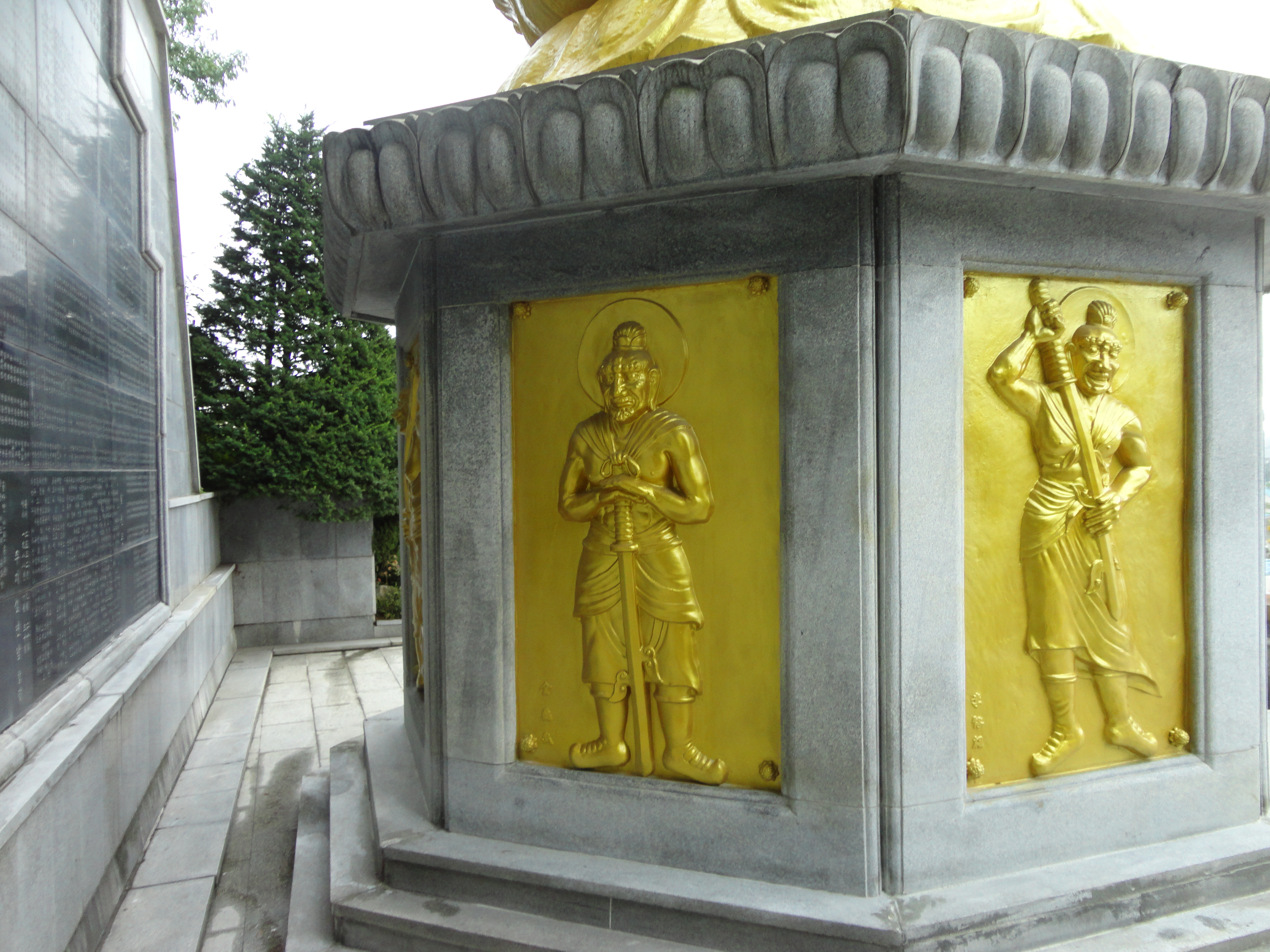
Details of the pillar

== Hwaryeongjeon (화령전) ==
37°17′00″N 127°00′45″E
Next to Haenggung, built in 1801, is Hwaryeongjeon, a shrine housing the portraits King Jeongjo. It had been Jeongjo's unfulfilled desire to build this small complex, so it was constructed in the first year of King Sunjo's reign in his honour. The site was dedicated to King Jeongjo; however, unlike other such shrines, in which ancestral tablets are housed for religious services, Hwaryeongjeon houses a portrait (restored in 2005) of the king, which was a more usual protocol for honouring a living monarch.

The gates in Hwaryeongjeon are as follow: Oesammun (외삼문); Naesammun (내삼문); Dongcheukhyeobmun (동측협문); Bukcheukhyeobmun (북측협문); Namcheukhyeobmun (남측협문). The buildings, meanwhile, are called Punghwadang (풍화당), Iancheong (이안청), Bokdogak (복도각), Unhangak (운한각) and Jeonsacheong (전사청), while there is also a well, named Jejeong (제정).

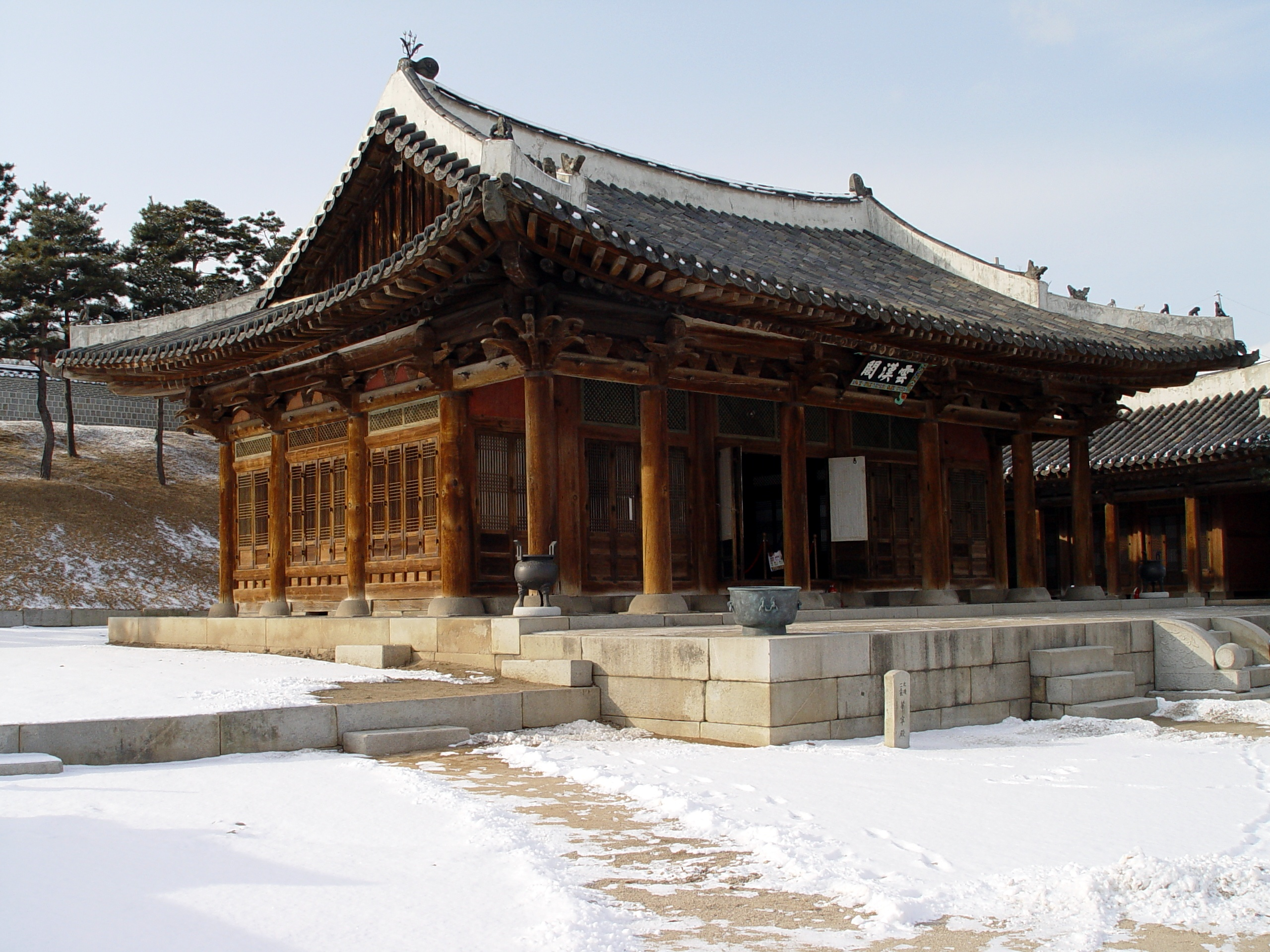
The south-east corner of Unhangak

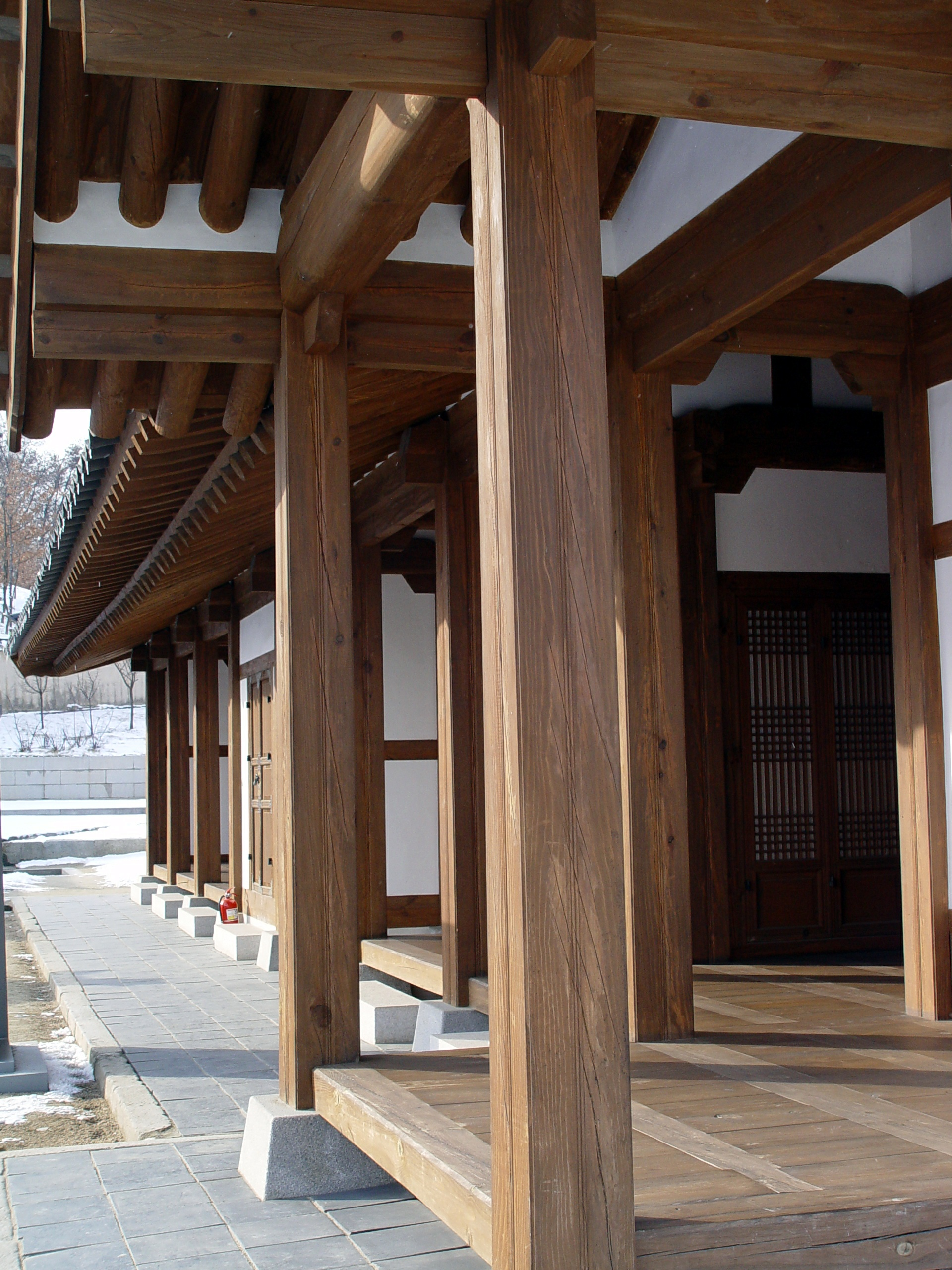
The south side of Jeonsacheong

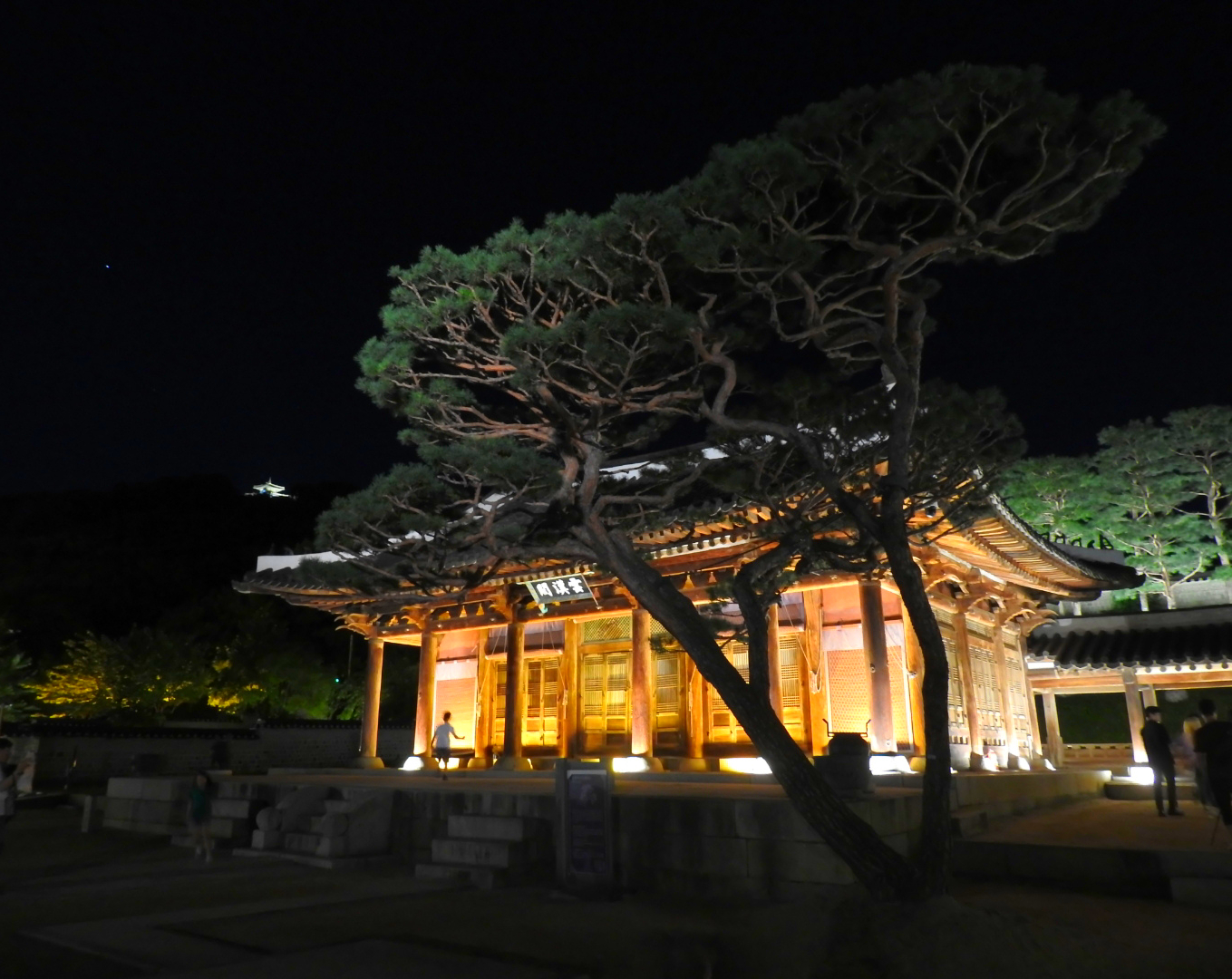
Unhangak at night

== The 1795 Eight Days Parade ==
King Jeongjo moved the tomb of his father Prince Sado to the foot of Mt. Hwasan in Suwon in 1789 and each year, a royal tomb visitation procession was organized for King Jeongjo to worship his father's tomb. The royal procession in February 1795 was the largest, since it was the 60th anniversary of his mother, Lady Hyegyeong, and therefore the 60th anniversary of his deceased father. (Remember that in Korea, the day of birth is a birthday, so that the 60th Western anniversary is the 61st Korean birthday). This 1795 procession was a huge event, involving 5,661 people and 1,417 horses.

As usual, this Court event has been documented by the Royal Library, leading to the "Wonhaeng Eulmyo Jeongni Uigwe" (Eulmyo= 1795). As for each Uigwe, several "official copies" of this document have been realized (the main copy being more precious and reserved for the King's use). The main document of this Uigwe is an eight-panel screen: 화성행행도 병풍 Hwaseonghaenghaengdo Byeongpun. Nowadays, it existe three copies of this screen, a sepia one, a blue one (see gallery below) and a color one, the King's use copy. This last copy can be seen at Samsung Museum of Art Leeum and has been designated as Treasure 1430 in 2005-04-15.

The paintings depict important events of the trip, though the order of the panel does not reflect the actual procedure.

1. Visit to the Royal Ancestral Tomb at Hwaseong, 1795-02-11
2. Special Civil and Military Service Examinations, 1795-02-11
3. Banquet in Honor of the King's Mother at Bongsu Hall, 1795-02-13
4. Feast for the Elders at Nangnam Pavilion, 1795-02-14
5. Nighttime Military Exercises at Seojangdae, 1795-02-12
6. King Shooting Arrows at Deukjung Pavilion, 1795-02-14
7. Procession Returning to the Detached Palace, 1795-02-15
8. Procession Crossing the Han River over a Pontoon Bridge at Noryangjin, 1795-02-16

A scene like the banquet held at Bongsudang Hall closely resembles the traditional composition of paintings at that time. However, the composition of the scene depicting the procession returning to the Royal Palace is in the shape of a ‘之’, which is characteristic of the lifetime paintings of famous court painter Kim Hongdo. The last scene depicting the procession crossing the Hangang River over a pontoon bridge reveals a unique composition, which is rarely witnessed in paintings of royal processions at that time.

According to palace records, Lady Hyegyeong, the King's mother, was so pleased to be presented with a screen of such scale and precision that she rewarded each of the seven artists who participated in its production. The artists were Choe Deuk-hyeon, Kim Deuk-sin, Yi Myeong-gyu, Jang Han-jong (1768 - 1815), Yun Seok-keun, Heo Sik (1762 - ?) and Yi In-mun.

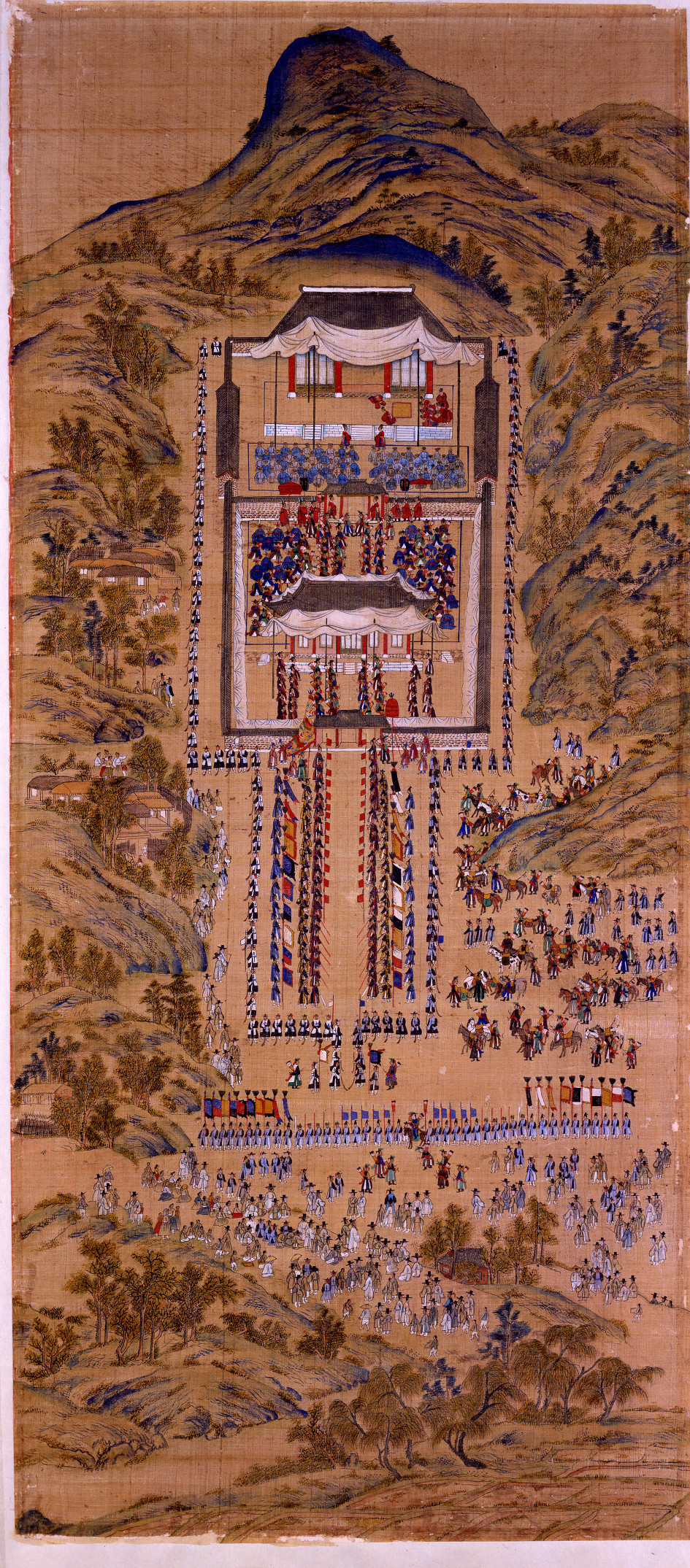
Tombs
화성성묘전배

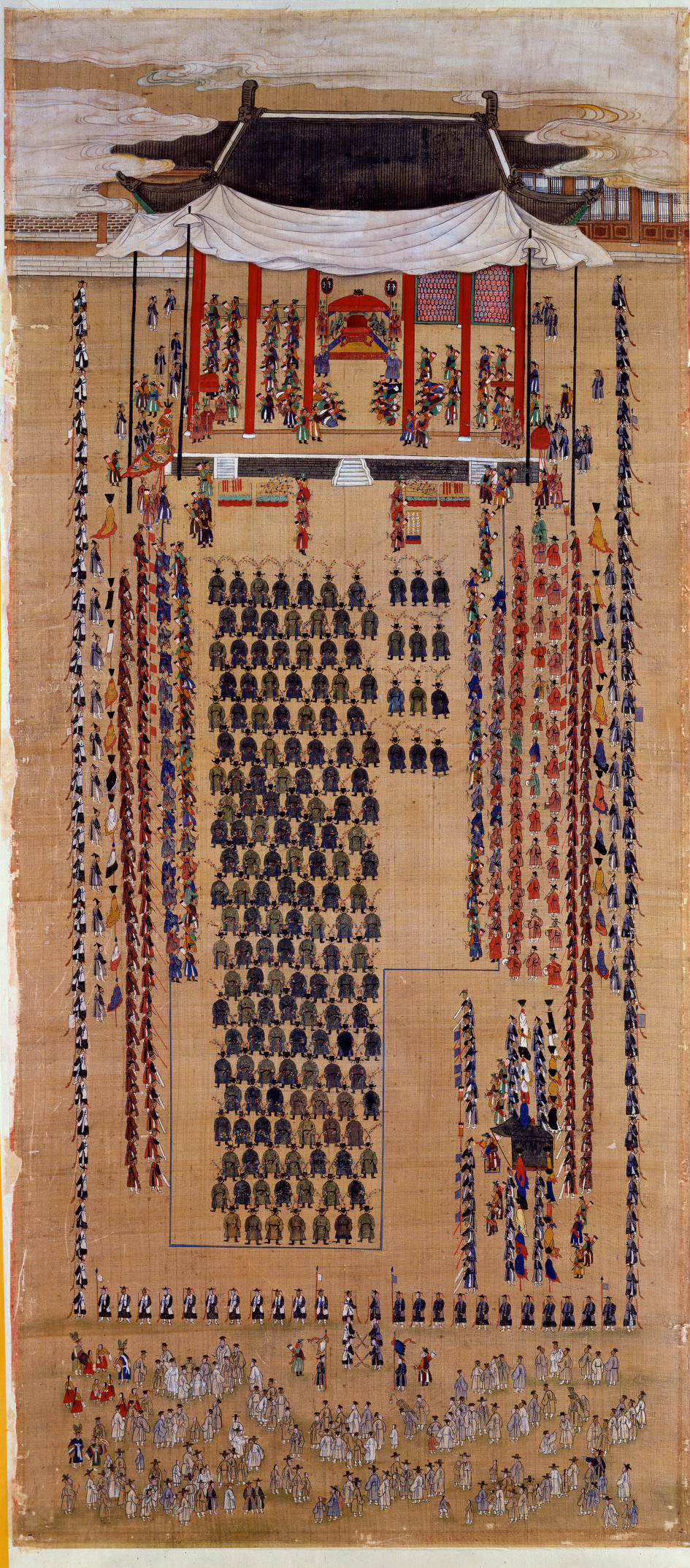
Examinations
낙남헌방방

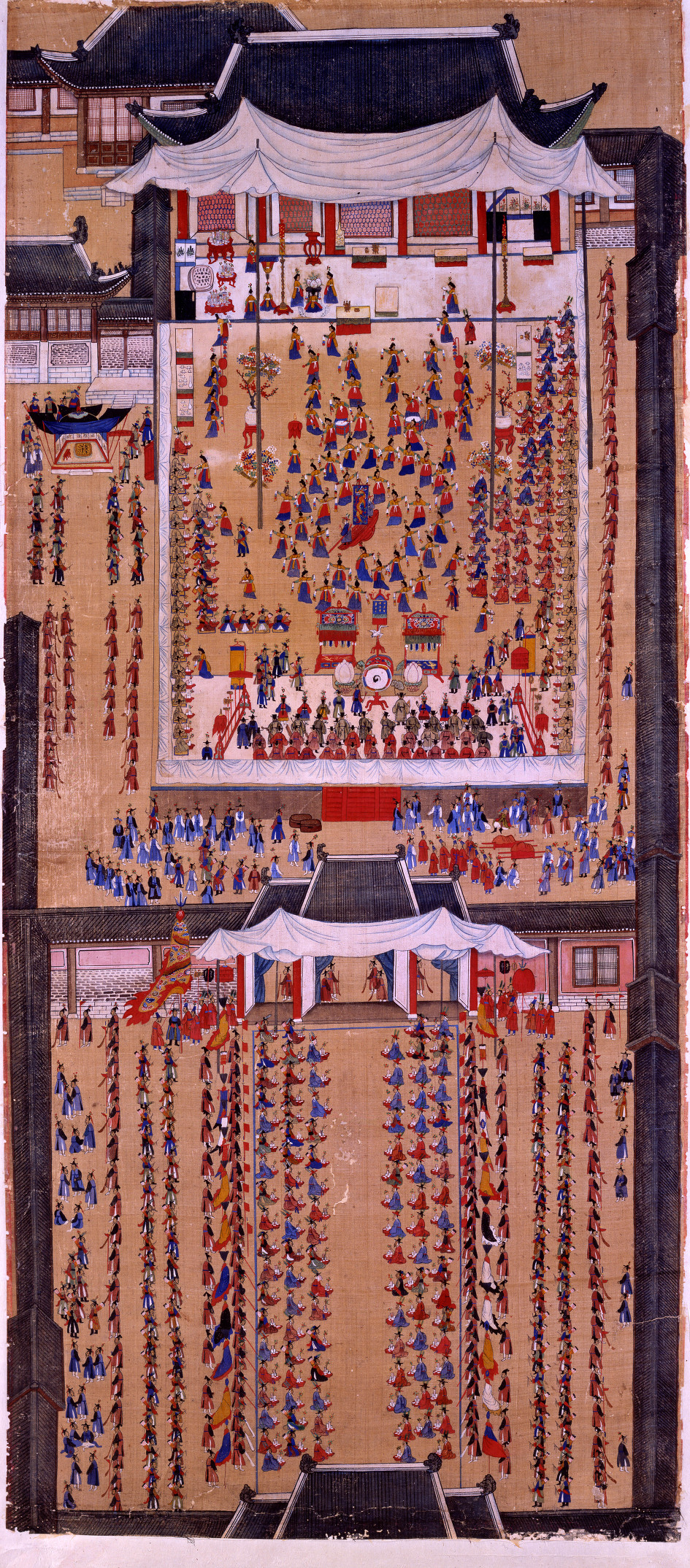
Banquet
봉수당진찬

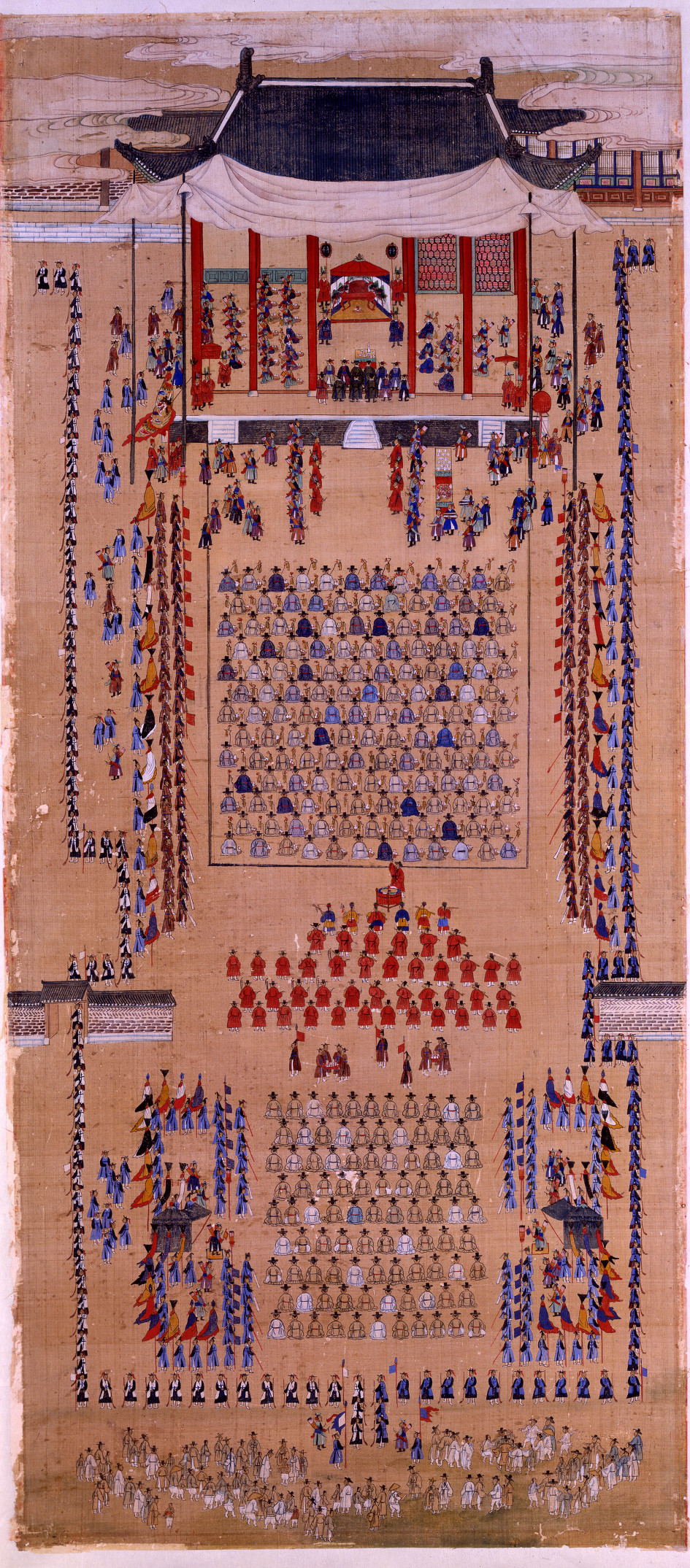
Elders
낙남헌양로연

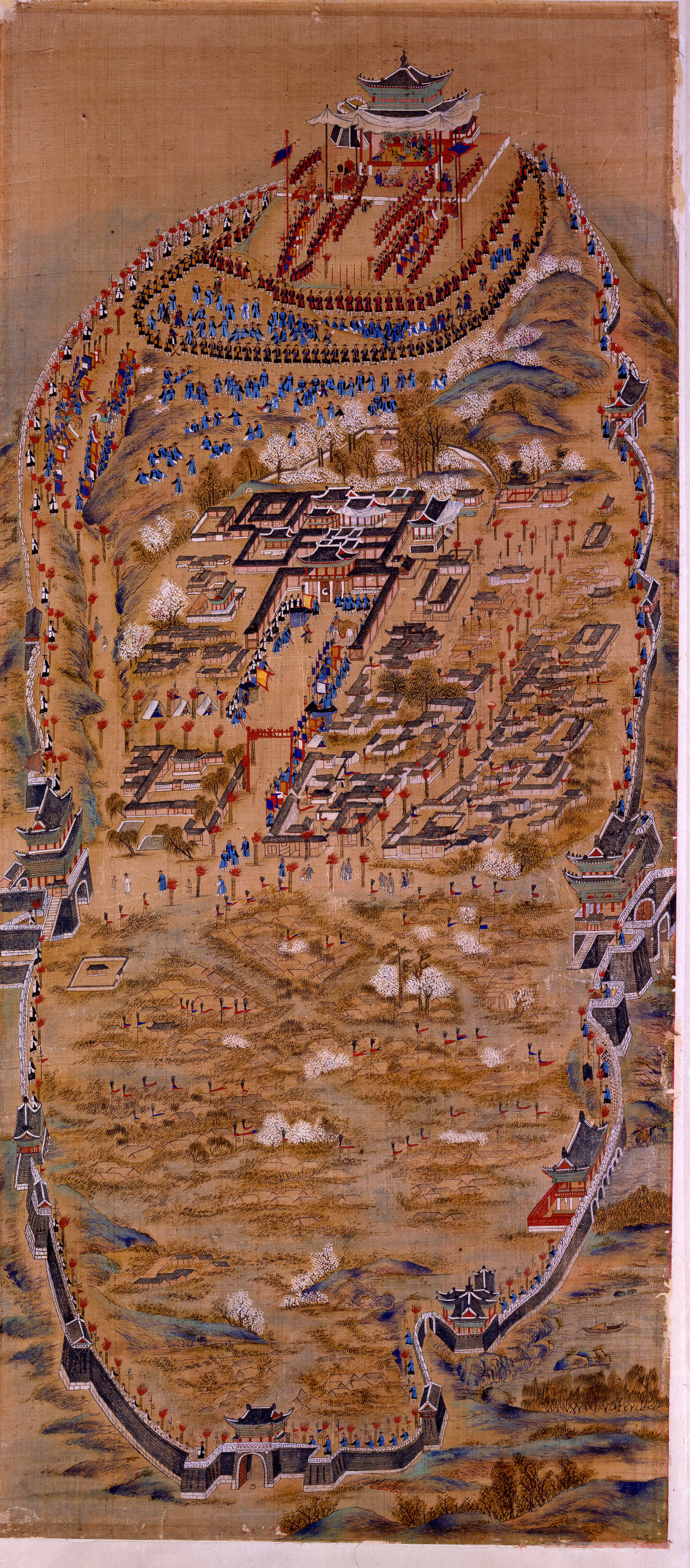
Seojangdae
서장대야조

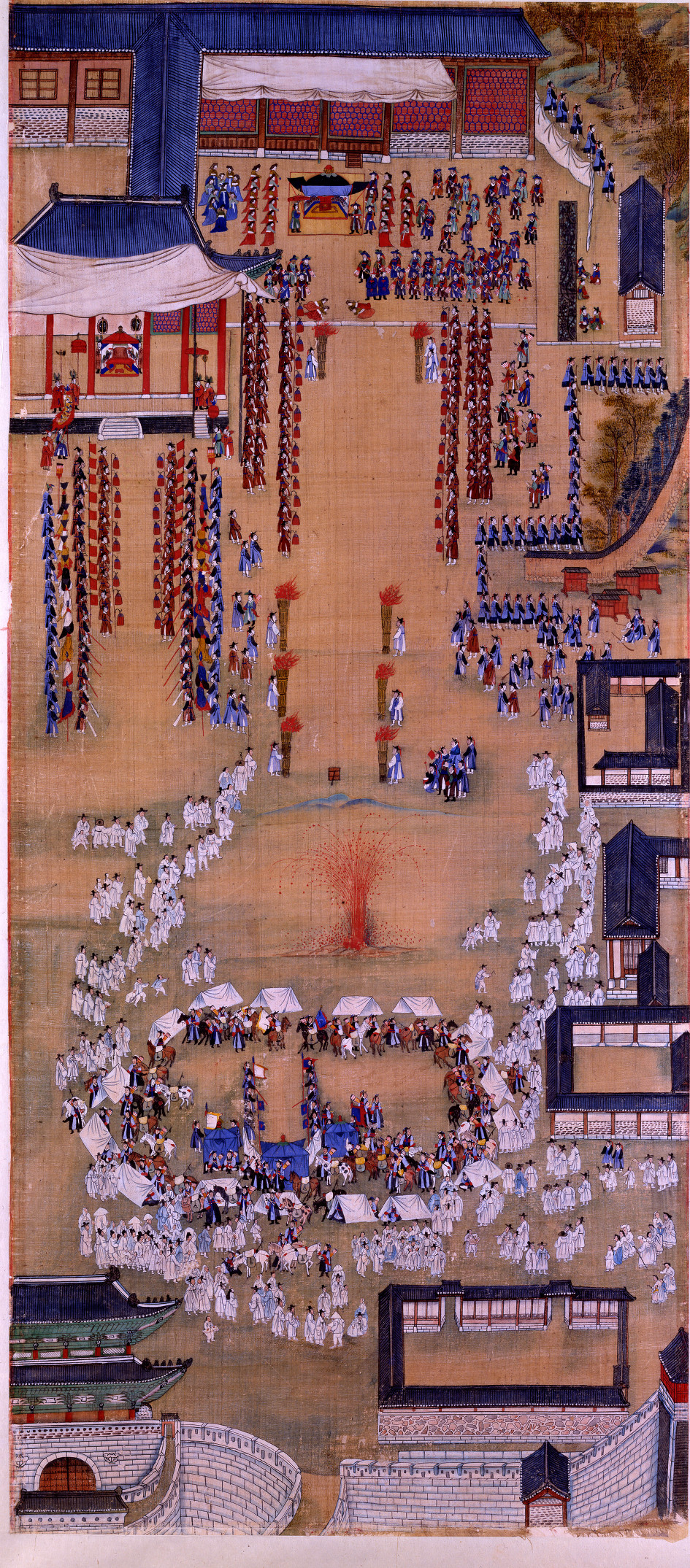
Arrows
득중정어사

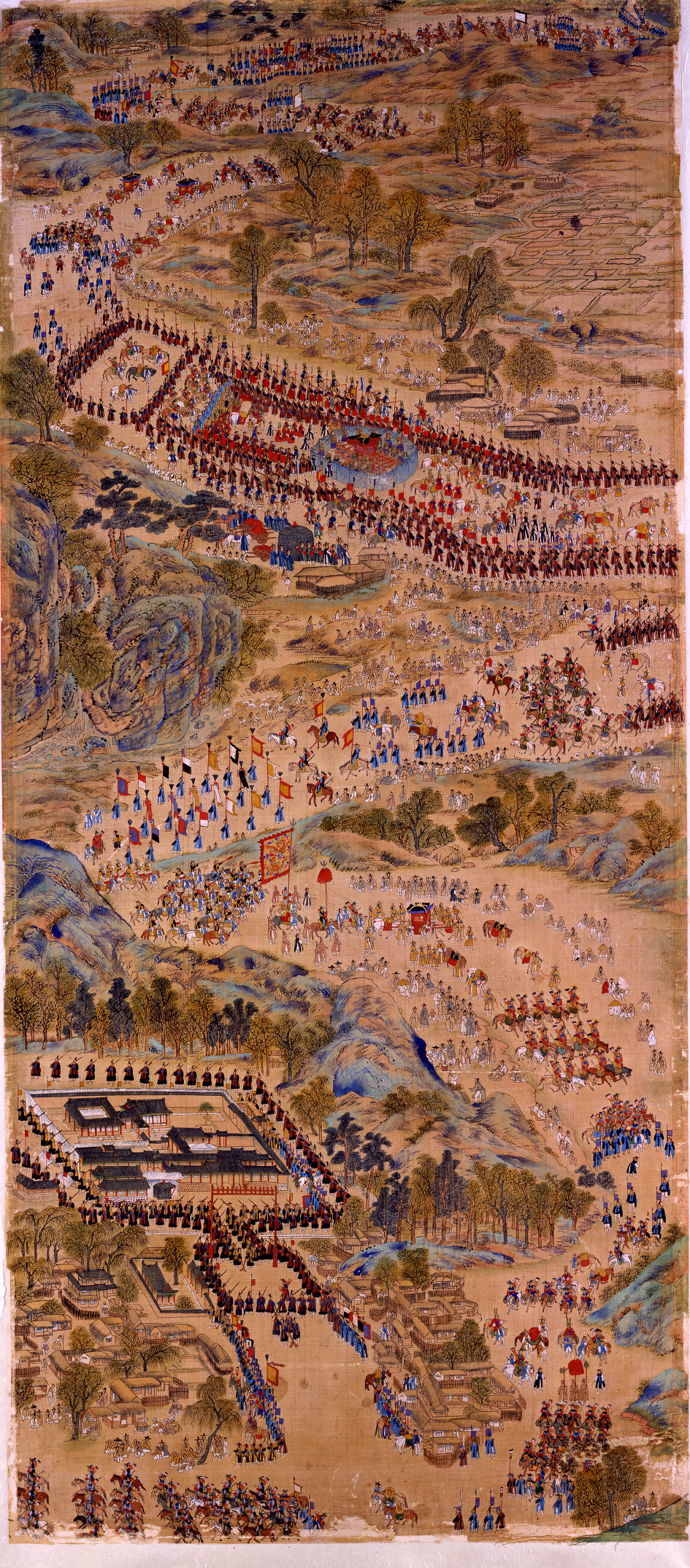
Procession
환어행렬

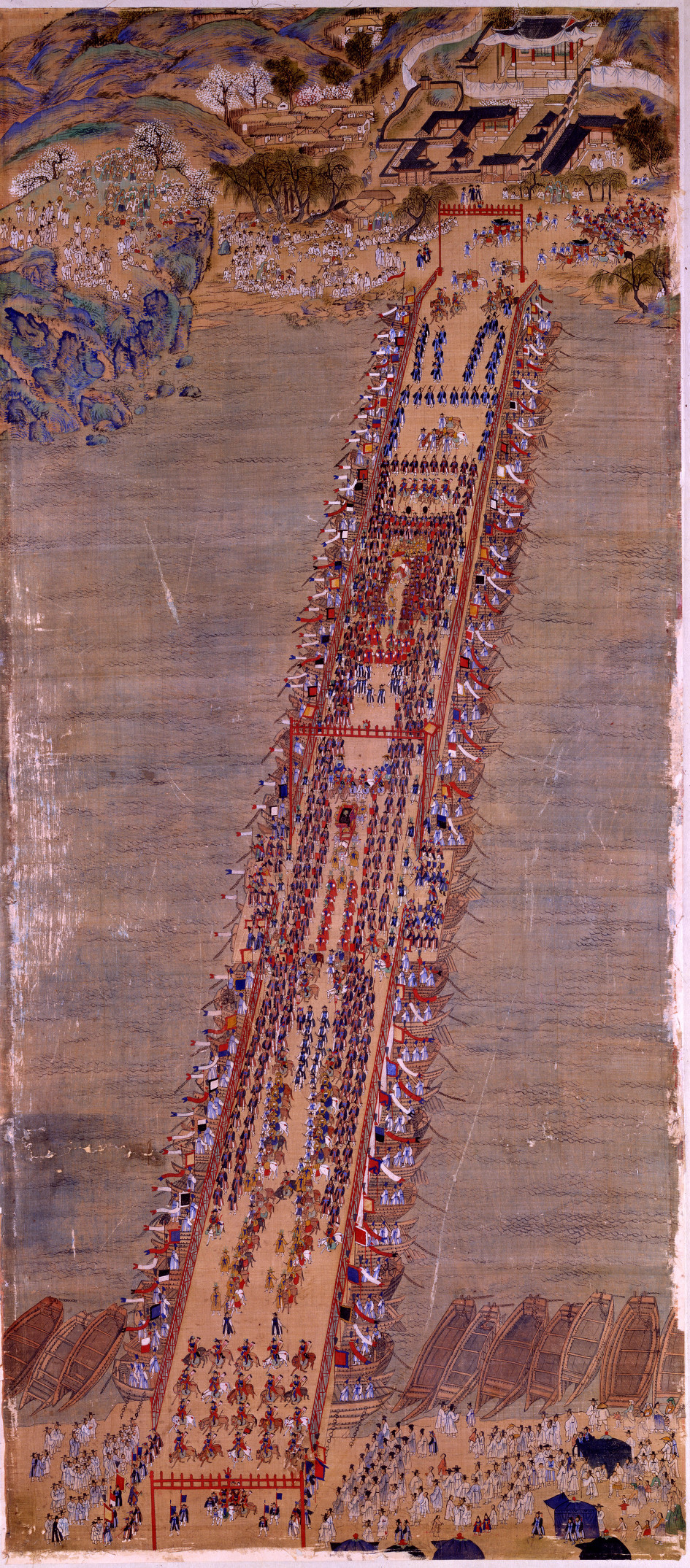
Bridge
한강주교환어

화성행행도 병풍 Hwaseonghaenghaengdo Byeongpun

A comparison between these panels and a military map of the Fortress is interesting: the focus of the court painters seems more directed towards literati concerns (e.g.: where is Yongyeon and how to access this pond through Buknam-ammun ?) than towards military concerns (e.g. Dongjangdae has disappeared). One can also think about some kind of military 'non-disclosure' clause.

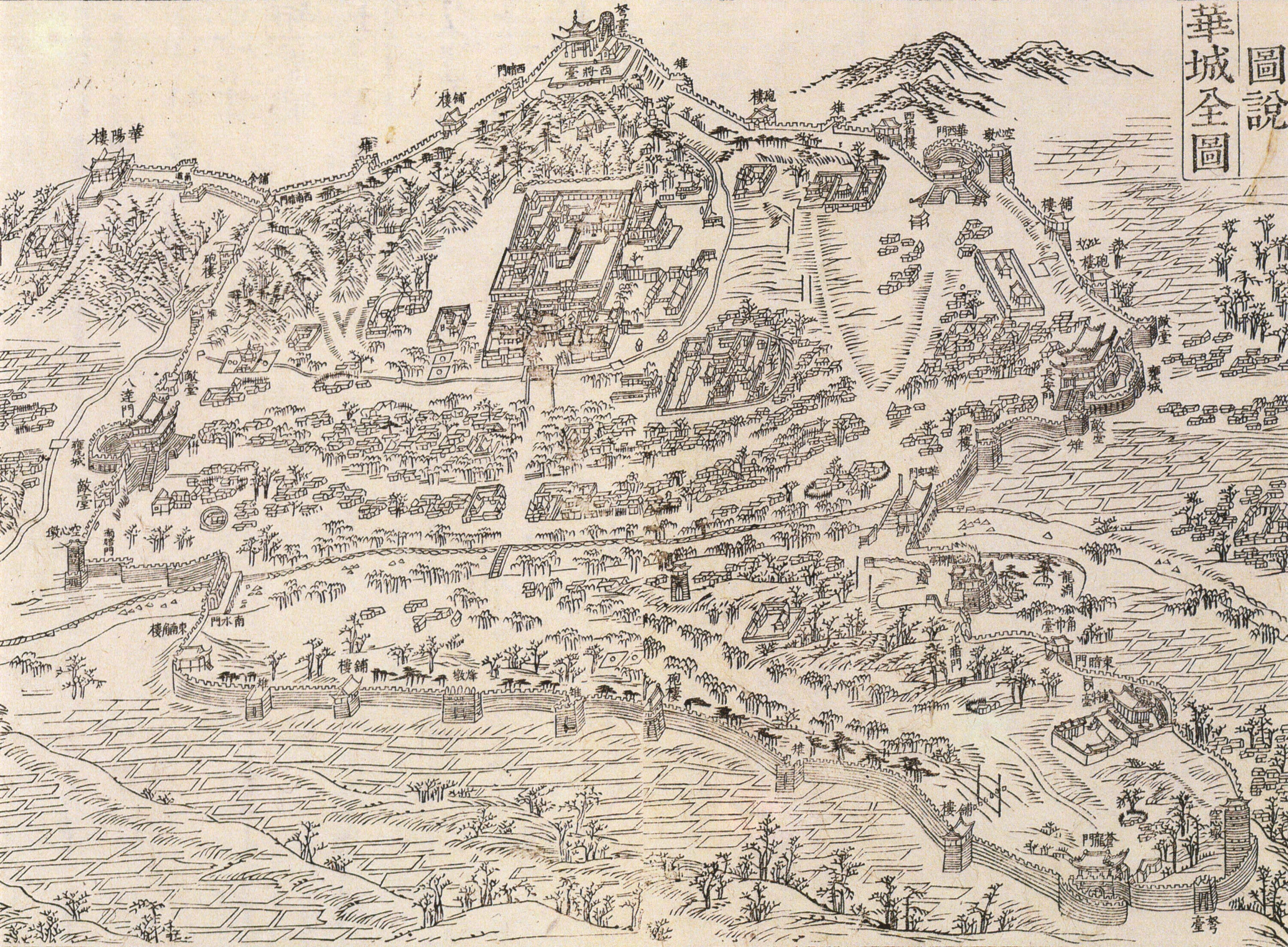
Hwaseong Jeondo
화성전도

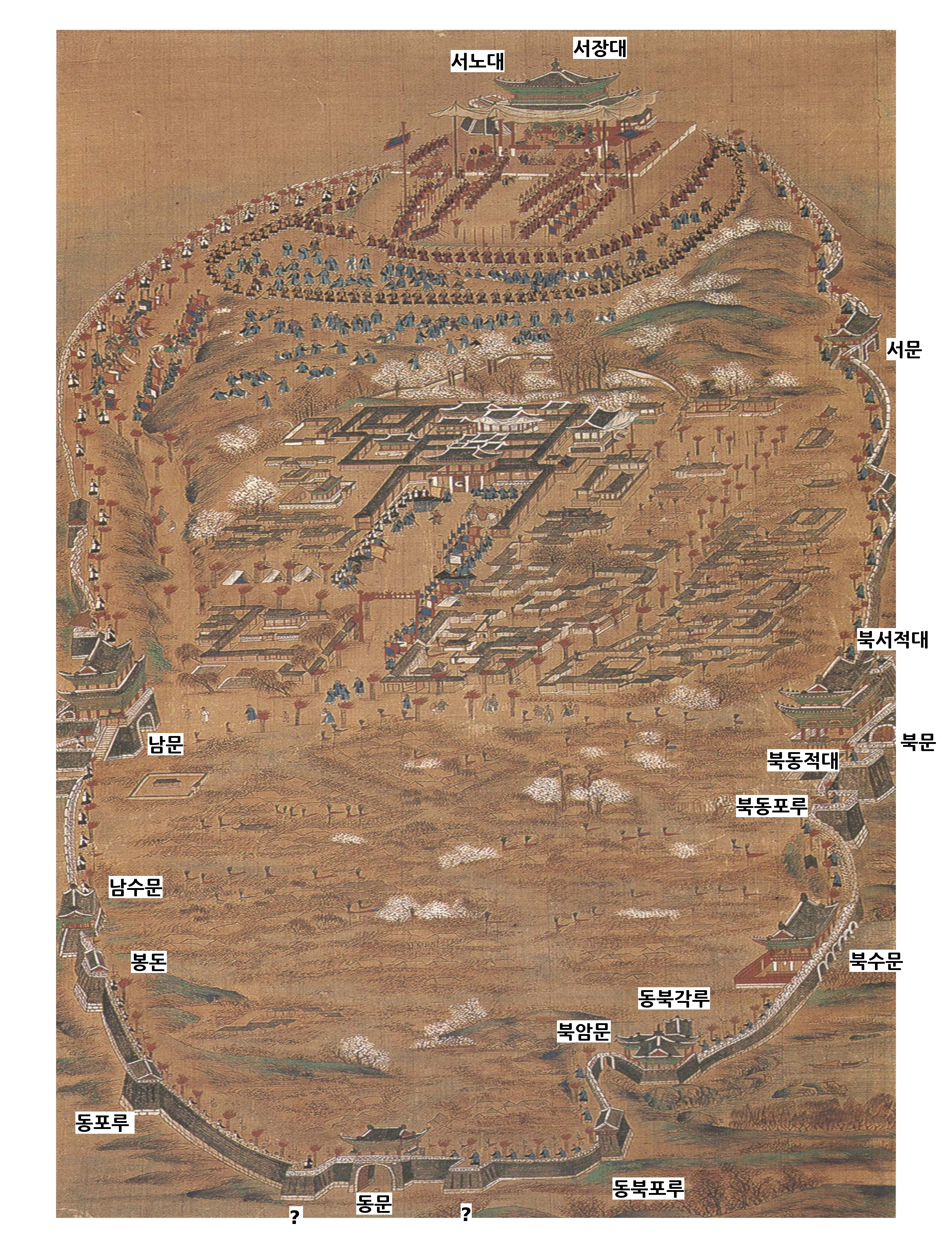
5th Panel
화성행행도 병풍(5)

Military map versus Courtier map

== Reconstruction and Repair ==
The main reconstruction of Hwaseong was in the 1970s, though it has undergone periodic maintenance since then. The cost of this reconstruction is summarized (Wons) in the following table.

Date	Zone	Structures	Surroundings	Total
1975-1	Janganmun-Seojangdae	281,144,000	11,770,000	
1975-2	Seojangdae-Paldalmun	192,024,000	4,190,000	
1976	Buksumun-Changryongmun	289,150,000	137,650,000	
1977	Janganmun-Buksumun	46,944,000	133,900,000	
1978	Changryongmun-Spur	148,088,000	234,690,000	
Total		957,350,000	522,200,000	1,479,550,000

- As of winter 2008 the wall has been under repair by Suwon City Council, while the South Gate's roof is undergoing a full dismantling and reconstruction.
- As of March 2011, Dongbuk Gongsimdon is also being repaired.
- Concerning Namsumun, a full rebuilding was launched in June 2010 and the actual floodgate is 29.4m long, 5.9m wide and 9.3m high. The inauguration was 2012-6-9.

== Festivals and Performances ==
Hwaseong is the focus of several performances and festivals. Most of the performances occur in the square in front of Haenggung and are as follow.

=== Weekend Performance ===
A variety of traditional performances are enacted each Saturday from March to November at 2 p.m.

=== Martial Arts Performance ===
Twenty-four martial arts are demonstrated following the routine used in King Jeongjo's time as king. The twenty-four arts were compiled in 1790 by Lee Deokmu and Park Jega, who had received orders as such from King Jeongjo and a master of martial arts at that time, Baek Dongsu. The textbook they made for instruction in martial arts was formed by the arts of the Joseon dynasty. These martial arts were then practised by the soldiers of Hwaseong under the supervision of Jang Yongyeong. The demonstration occurs at 11 a.m. daily from March to November excepting Mondays, and is performed on Saturdays and Sundays only in December.

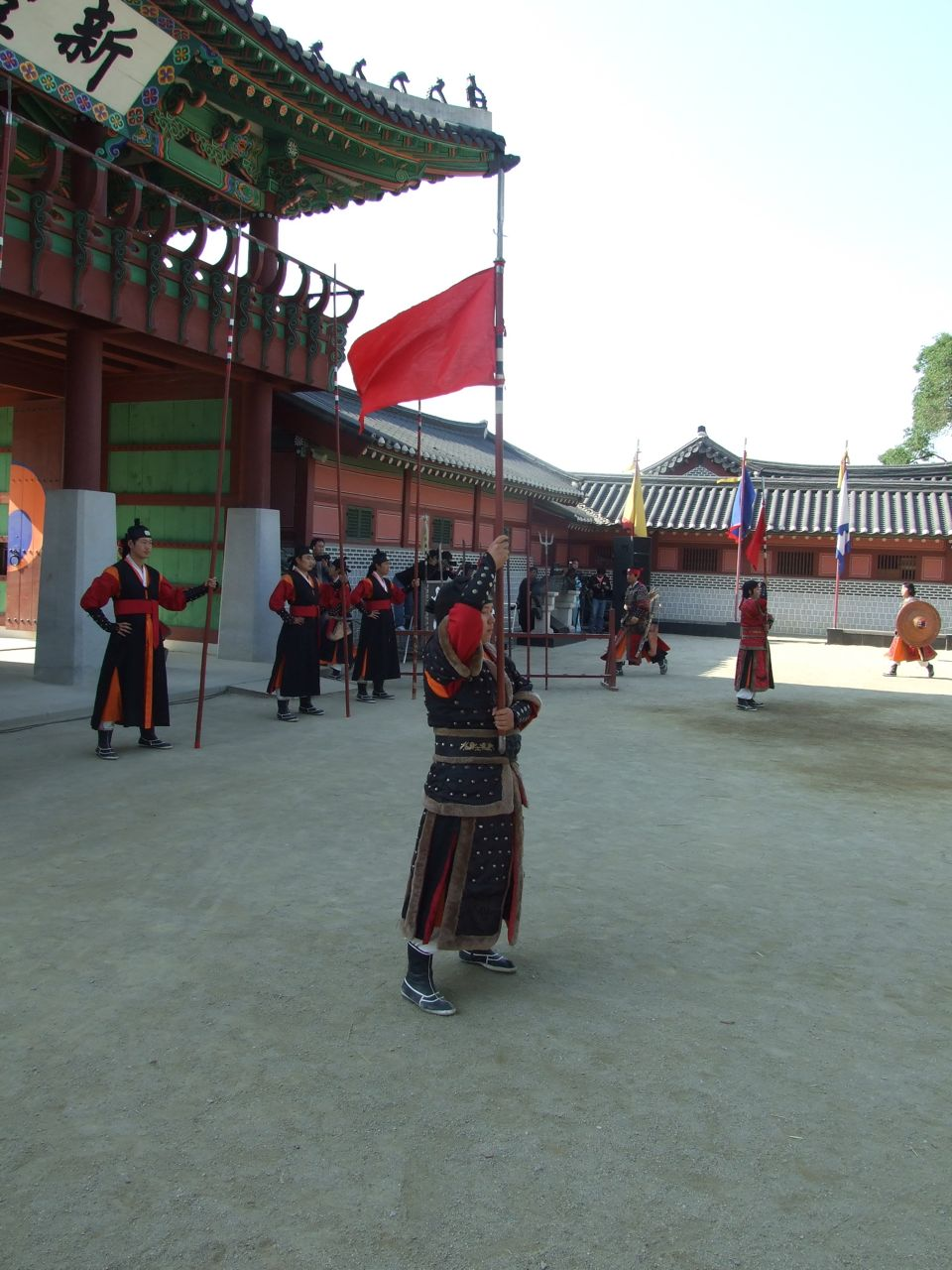

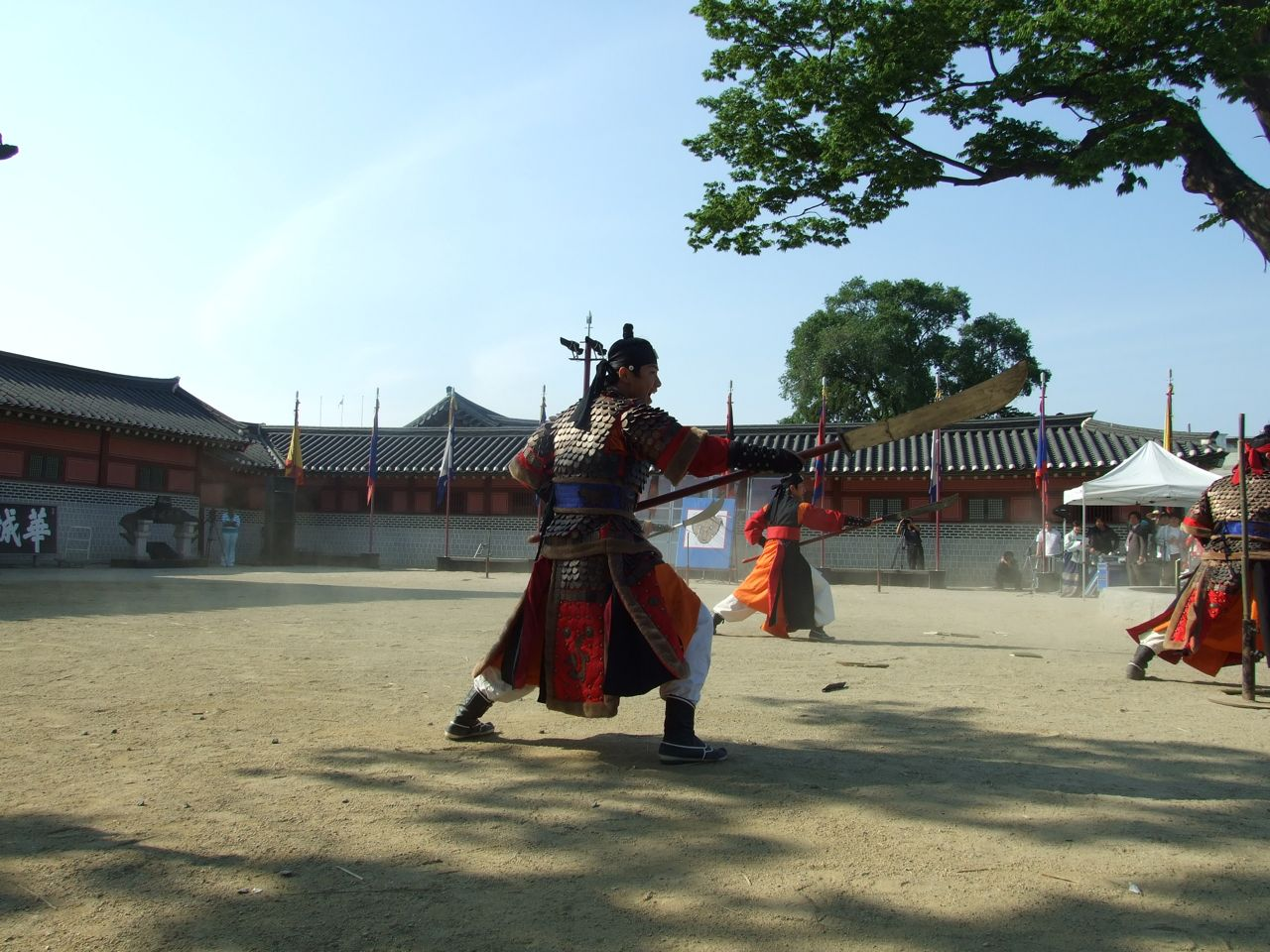

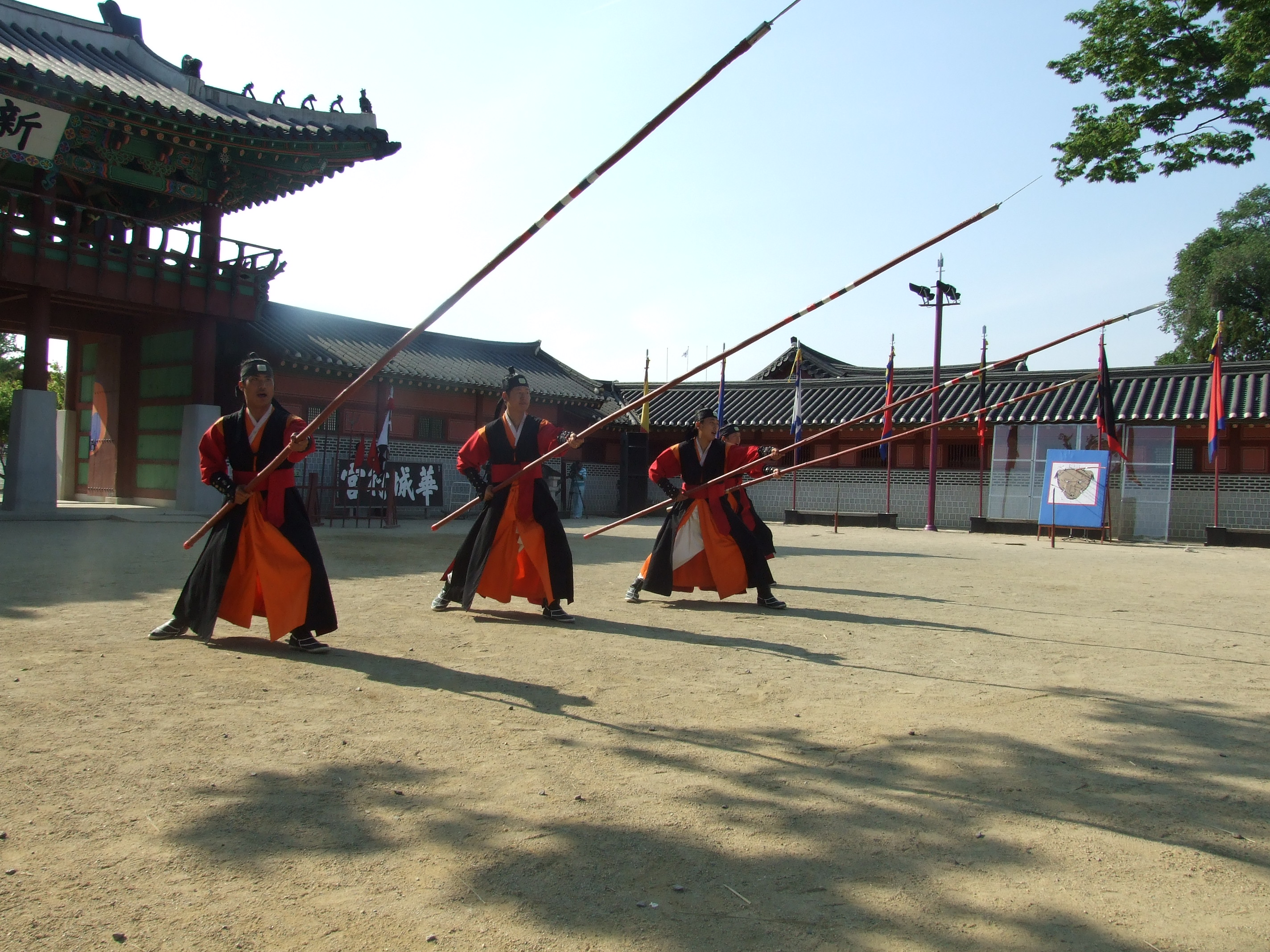

=== Royal Guards Ceremony ===
This ceremony is a reconstruction of that which was held in Hwaseong in the 1790s by the royal guards who had been promoted to the position of hunryeon dogam, meaning training guards. There were twelve thousand guards housed in Korea's largest military camp. When King Jeongjo moved his father's body to Hwasan in Suwon in 1789 he named the tomb Hyeonryungwon and deployed soldiers from this camp to guard the new site. After changing the name of the fortress from Suwonbu to Hwaseong in 1793, a camp attached to Jang Yongyeong was built within the walls. Hwaseong's official website states that this performance occurs at 2 p.m. each Sunday from March to November.

== Fictional depiction ==
The Hwaseong Fortress is the setting of the South Korean TV series Eight Days, Assassination Attempts against King Jeongjo. This series depicts the 1795 procession organized by King Jeongjo for the 60th birthday of his mother, Lady Hyegyeong, that also commemorated the 60th birthday of his deceased father, Prince Sado.

The screenplay is based on the novel Journey (원행, RR: wonhaeng, "a round trip") written in 2006 by Oh Seyeong (오세영). Apart from the fictional elements, a major focus is placed on two historical sources. The Memoirs of Lady Hyegyeong are extensively used during many flashback sequences relative to events that occurred before the death (1762) of Prince Sado, while the official documents from the Joseon Royal Library are used for the 1795 events: the "Wonhaeng Eulmyo Jeongni Uigwe" for the Procession itself, and the "Hwaseong Seongyeokuigwe" concerning the Hwaseong Fortress as a whole.

== Tips for tour ==
The Hwaseong Trolley consists of a power car and three passenger cars. The front of the power car appears as a caricature of a modern red sedan. The passenger cars resemble the king's sedan chair to display the royal authority and for the convenience of spectators.

== See also ==
- Hwaseong seongyeok uigwe – Uigwe recording the building of the Hwaseong Fortress
- Korean fortress
- List of fortresses in Korea
- Jeongjo of Joseon
- Prince Sado
- Yeongjo of Joseon

== Bibliography ==
- Chevalier, Henri (1898). Cérémonial de l'achèvement des travaux de Hoa Syeng (Corée) 1800. Toung Pao (in French). Vol. 9. E. J. Brill. pp. 384–396.
- Doo Won Cho (2010). The Korean fortress City Suwon: History; Conservation Heritage; Documentation "Hwaseong Seongyeok Uigwe"; National and International Relations (doctoralthesis) (in German). University of Bamberg, Inaugural Dissertation. p. 727.
- Haboush, JaHyun Kim (1996). The Memoirs of Lady Hyegyong: The Autobiographical Writings of a Crown Princess of Eighteenth-Century Korea. University of California Press. p. 329. ISBN 978-0520200555.
- Oh, Seyeong (2006). Journey. 제목:원행; 저자:오세영; 출판사:예담. Yedam (Wisdom House). p. 315. ISBN 9788-9591-3167-9. (in Korean)
- Pratt, Keith (2006). Everlasting Flower. Reaktion Book Ltd., London. p. 320.
- Setton, Mark (1997). Chŏng Yagyong: Korea's Challenge to Orthodox Neo-Confucianism. SUNY series in Korean studies. SUNY Press. p. 232. ISBN 9780791431733.
- Official Web Site of the Hwaseong Fortress
- UNESCO Hwaseong Fortress Site
