= Suwon Bus Terminal =

Bus station in Suwon, South Korea

Coordinates: 37.2506°N 127.0202°E

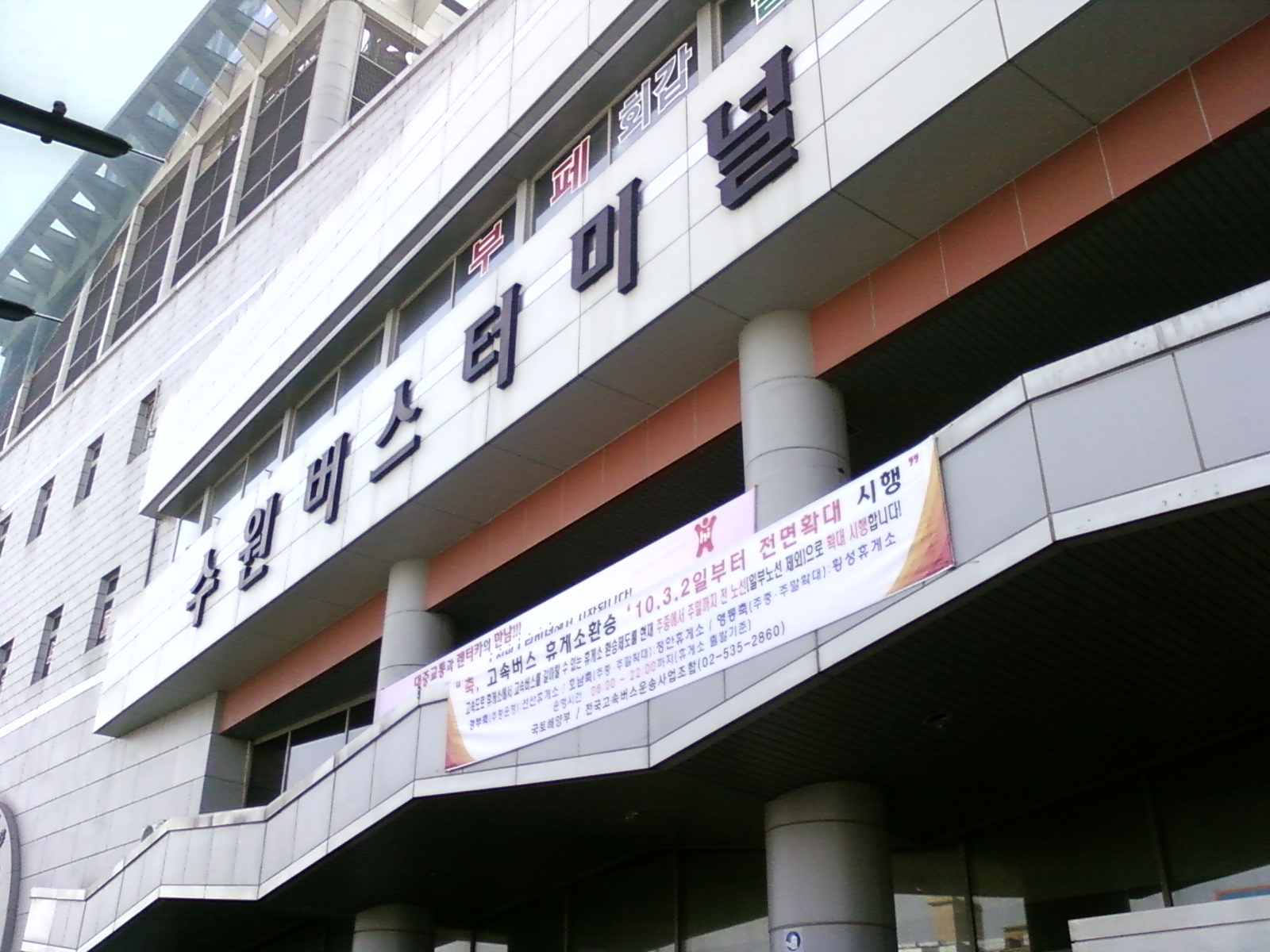
Suwon Bus Terminal

Suwon Bus Terminal (Korean: 수원버스터미널) is the main intercity and express bus station serving Suwon, Gyeonggi Province, South Korea. The station is located in Gwonseon District, 2.6 km south-east of Suwon Station. Standing beside a branch of E-Mart, it is not to be confused with West Suwon Bus Terminal, which is located adjacent to a different branch of the same store.

== Buses ==
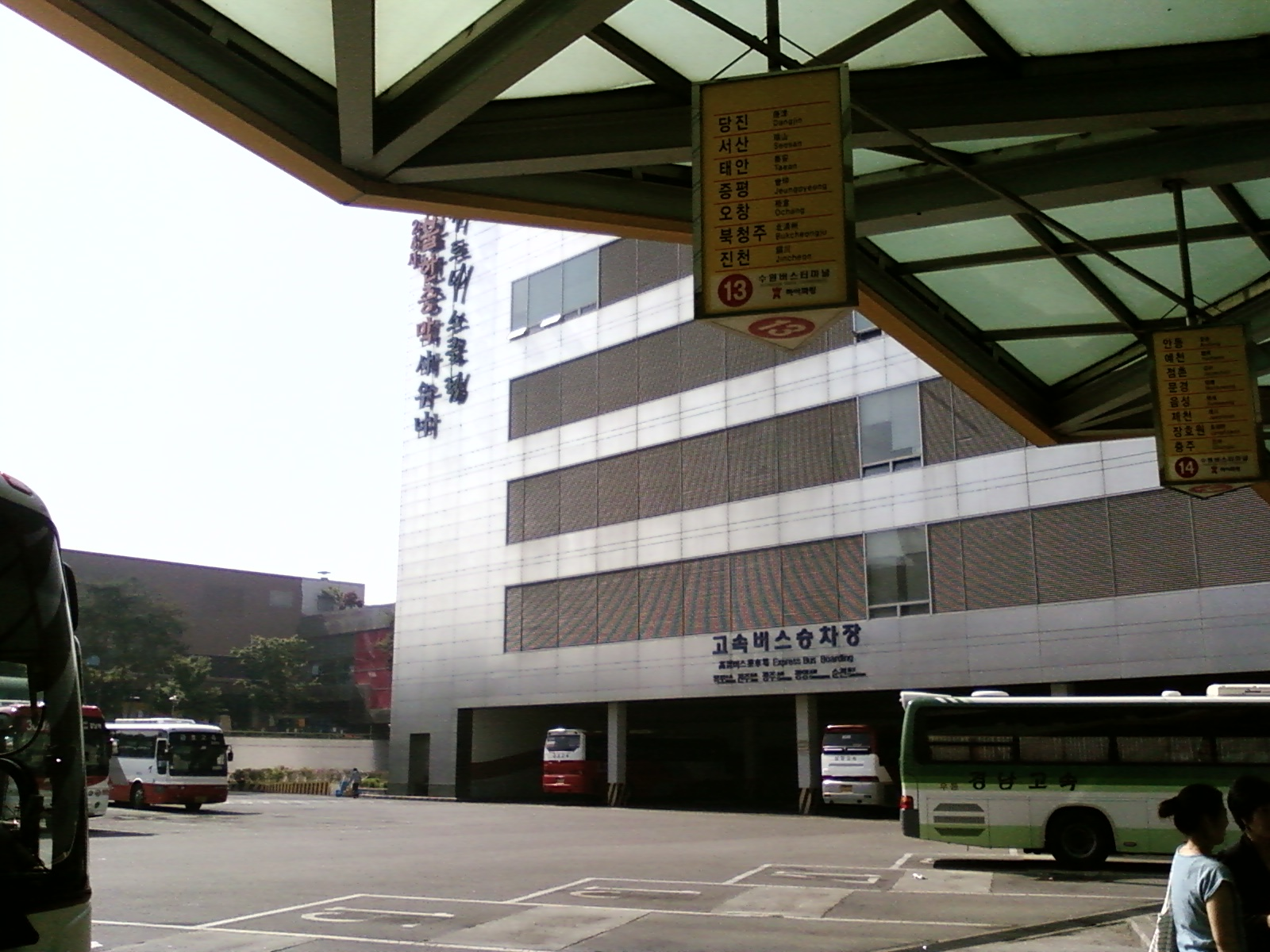
Platform

There are direct buses from Suwon Bus Terminal to the following places.

== Surroundings ==
- emart
- megabox

=== Express ===
Daejeon; Gwangju; Jinju; Mokpo

=== Inter-city ===
==== Chungcheong ====
Buyeo; Cheonan; Cheongju; Chungju; Daejeon; Eumseong; Jecheon; Jincheon; Onyang (Asan); Songnisan; Taean

==== Gangwon-do ====
Cheorwon; Chuncheon; Gangneung; Hongcheon; Sokcho; Wonju

==== Gyeonggi-do ====
Ansan; Anjung; Anseong; Bupyeong; Dongducheon; Goyang; Icheon; Incheon; Joam (Hwaseong); Pyeongtaek; Siheung; Uijeongbu; Yangpyeong; Yeoju

==== Gyeongsang ====
Andong; Busan; Changwon; Daegu; Gimhae; Gumi; Pohang; Sangju; Uljin; Ulsan; Yeongju; Yangsan;

==== Jeolla ====
Gunsan; Jeonju; Mokpo
