= West Suwon Bus Terminal =

Bus station in Suwon, South Korea

Coordinates: 37.2821°N 126.9699°E

- Hangul: 서수원버스터미널
- Hanja: 西水原버스터미널
- Revised Romanization: Seosuwon Beoseu Teomineol
- McCune–Reischauer: Sŏsuwŏn Pŏsŭ T'ŏminŏl

West Suwon Bus Terminal is the second-largest bus station in Suwon, a city in South Korea's north-west province of Gyeonggi-do. The station is located in Gwonseon-gu, 3.1km north-west of Suwon Station. Standing beside a branch of E-Mart, it is not to be confused with Suwon Bus Terminal, which is located adjacent to a different branch of the same store.

== Buses ==
There are direct buses from West Suwon Bus Terminal to the following places.

=== Chungcheong ===
Boryeong (Daecheon Beach); Eumseong; Jincheon

=== Gangwon-do ===
Cheorwon; Chuncheon; Hwacheon

=== Gyeonggi-do ===
Anseong; Gapyeong; Namyangju; Osan; Pocheon

=== Gyeongsang ===
North Daegu; Pohang

=== Jeolla ===
Jeonju (from February 24, 2008)

== Management ==
The bus station, unusually in South Korea, is run by a private company, namely Hantur D&D Co. Ltd. (Hangeul: 한터디앤디) in cooperation with Suwon City Council.
