= Joam-ri =

- Village
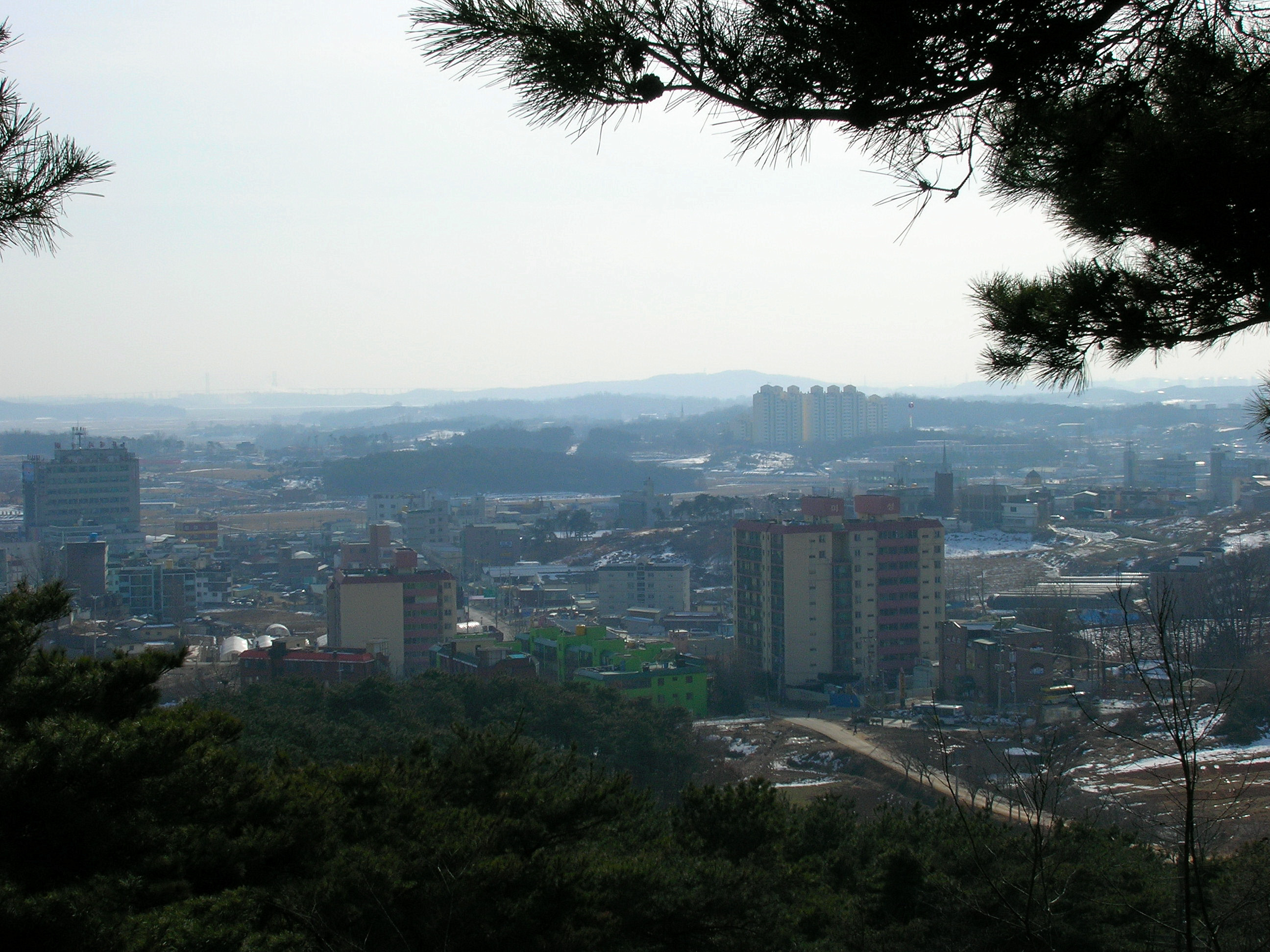
- Joam in 2008

- Location in South Korea
- Coordinates: 37°5′4″N 126°49′11″E
- Country: South Korea
- Region: Sudogwon
- Administrative divisions: 1 ri

Population
  - Dialect: Seoul

Korean name
- Hangul: 조암리
- RR: Joam-ri
- MR: Choam-ri

Joam-ri (Korean: 조암리) is a small town located in Gyeonggi-do, South Korea. The town is a part of the primarily rural and agricultural city of Hwaseong. Joam is also the urban center of Ujeong-eup, the population of which is approximately 18,000 and which encompasses both Joam and much of the surrounding countryside. Agriculture is the primary use of land in the region, rice being the main crop but with Chinese cabbage, radish, chili peppers, other fruit and vegetables, and livestock being grown and raised. The area is also home to several industrial sites including a large Kia Motors test facility.

Joam has many small businesses, restaurants and a traditional market with 752 stalls, which has operated since 1965.

It is a village surrounded by mountains. Because there is a large stone, the name Joam was derived from the words Morningdol, Dollaemal, or Joam, Joam-dong, and Jowon-dong.

== Origin of name ==
In Joam-ri, there used to be a large Chadol Rock inside the old village. When the sun rose in the morning, the sunlight reflected on the Chadol Rock, and the brilliance spread in all directions, making it beautiful. It was called Achimdol (morning stone), and then written in Chinese characters and named Joam-ri. Among the natural villages, Malmi was named so because the terrain of the mountains surrounding the village resembled a horse's tail. Supjeong-i was named so because there was a forest there. Old Asil was named so because it was the village where the old government office was located after it disappeared and a village was built there.

== Transportation ==
Joam Bus Terminal provides direct intercity services to Suwon and Seoul's Sadang Station. The buses depart frequently and operate seven days a week. Joam is also serviced by local buses and has a taxi depot.

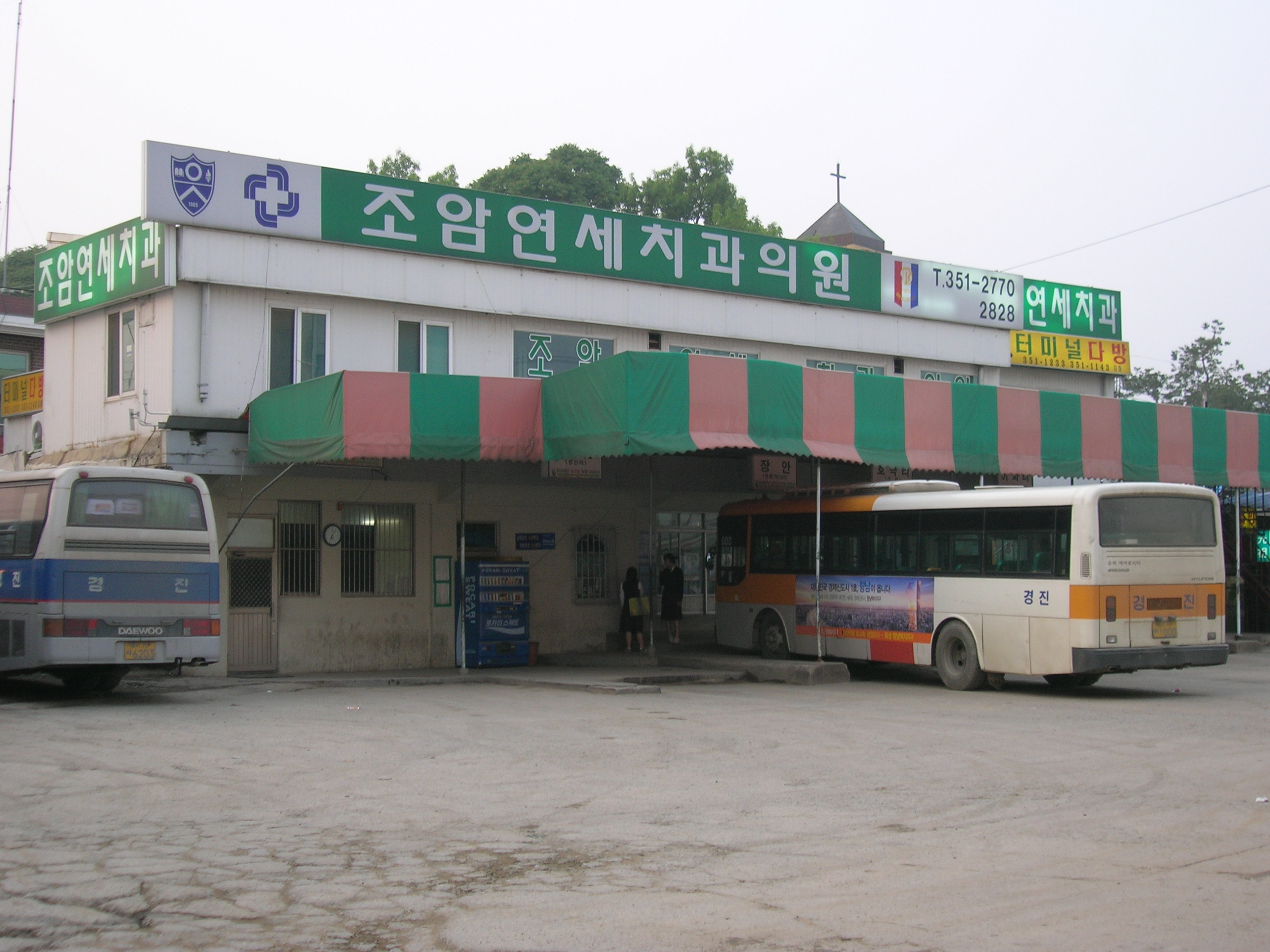
Joam Bus Terminal

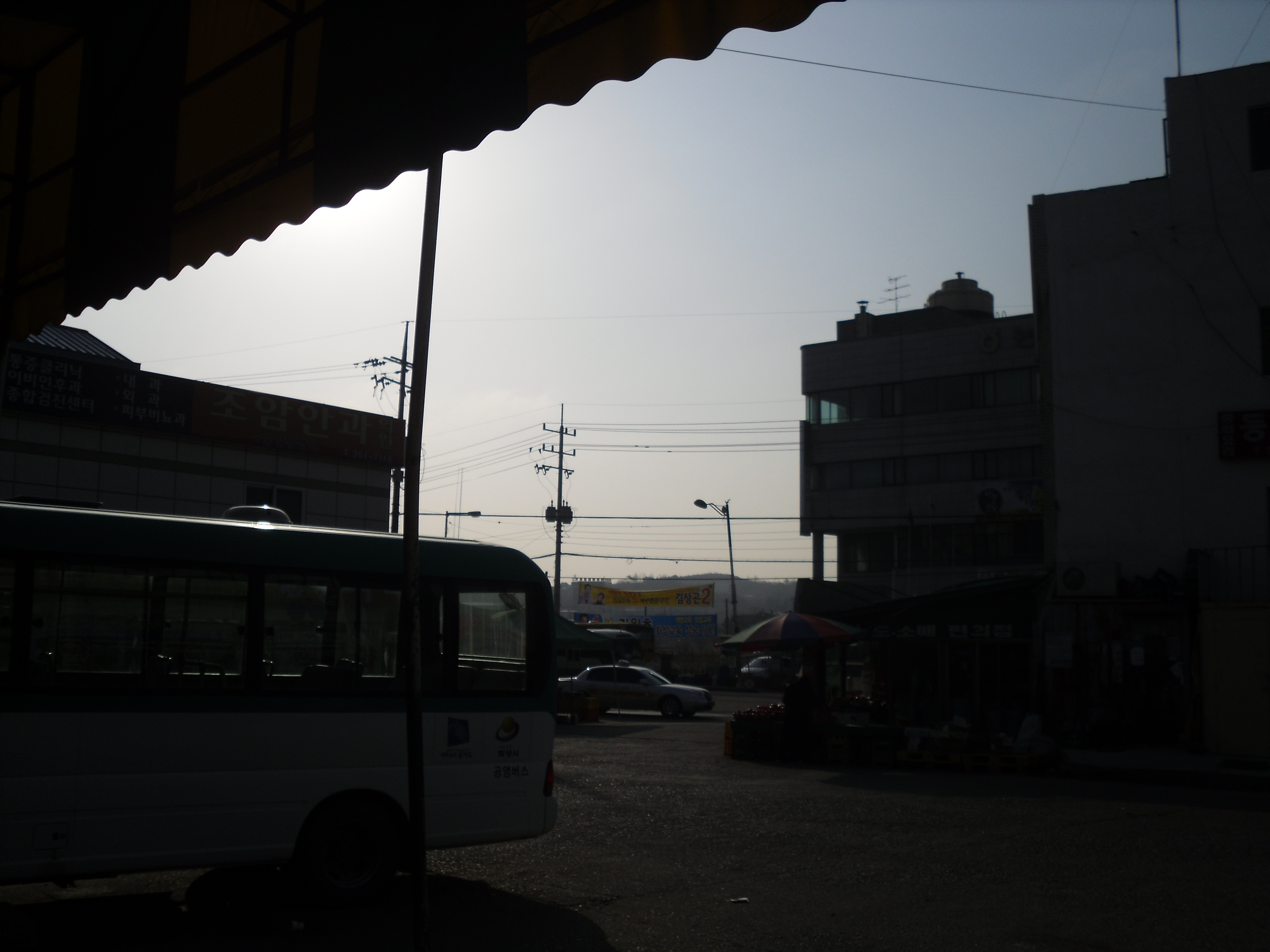
Joam Bus Terminal

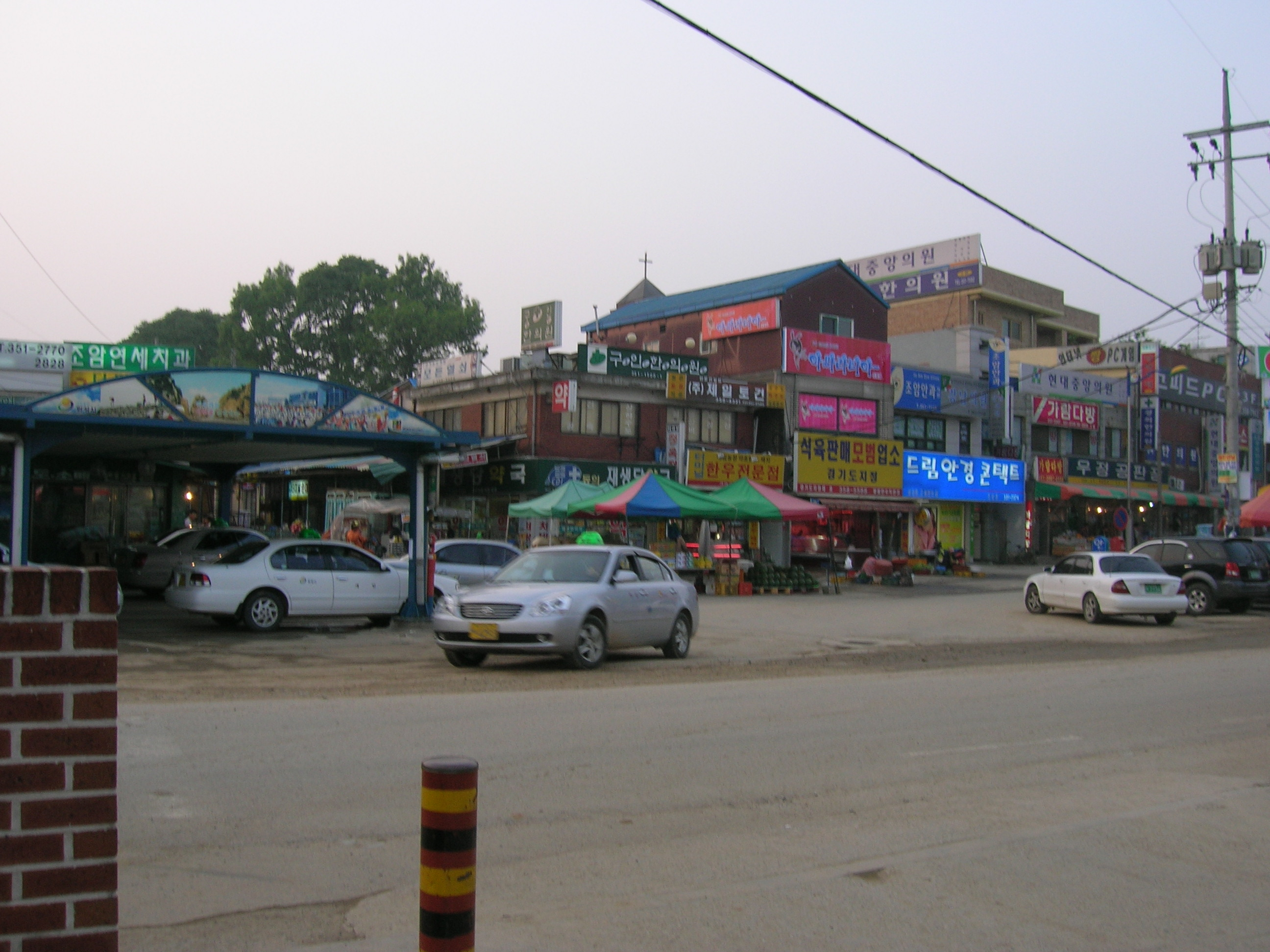
Joam Taxi Depot

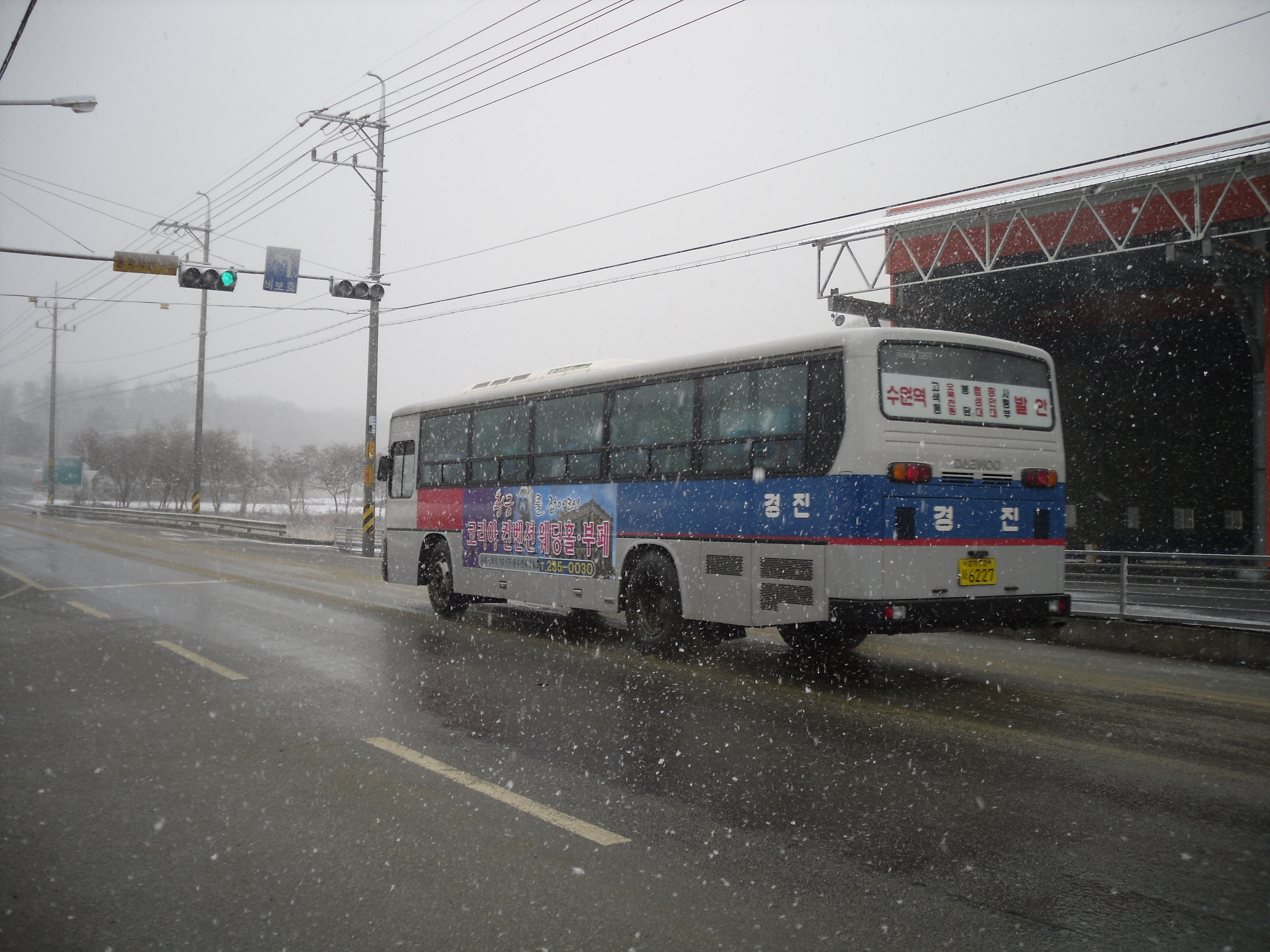
Joam to Suwon Bus

== Commerce ==
Joam hosts many small businesses including traditional open air stalls and more modern stores. Major stores include New World Mart, a large grocery store with an upper level dedicated to household goods, several branches of Nonghyup Bank, a Samsung Electronics store and two post offices. Many other stores cater to Joam's farmers, selling agricultural equipment and seeds. Joam also hosts a small store that caters to South Asian and Russian migrant workers. This store, located across the street from New World Mart, stocks rare items such as Southeast Asian food, Indian spices, black tea and international calling cards. Joam also hosts a traditional outdoor folk market three times a month. This market stocks fresh produce, baked and dried goods, seafood, plants, household items and clothing.

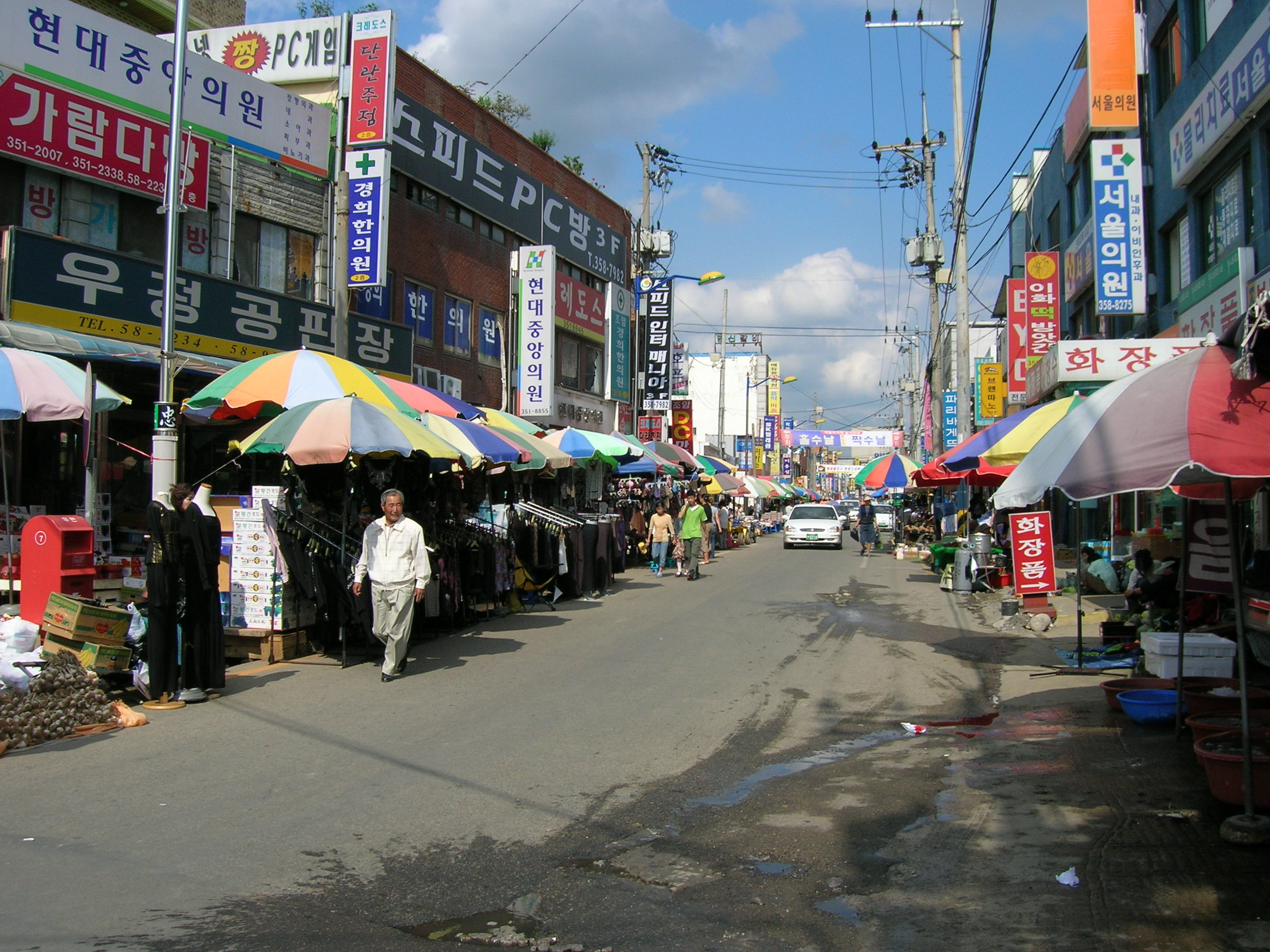
Traditional folk market

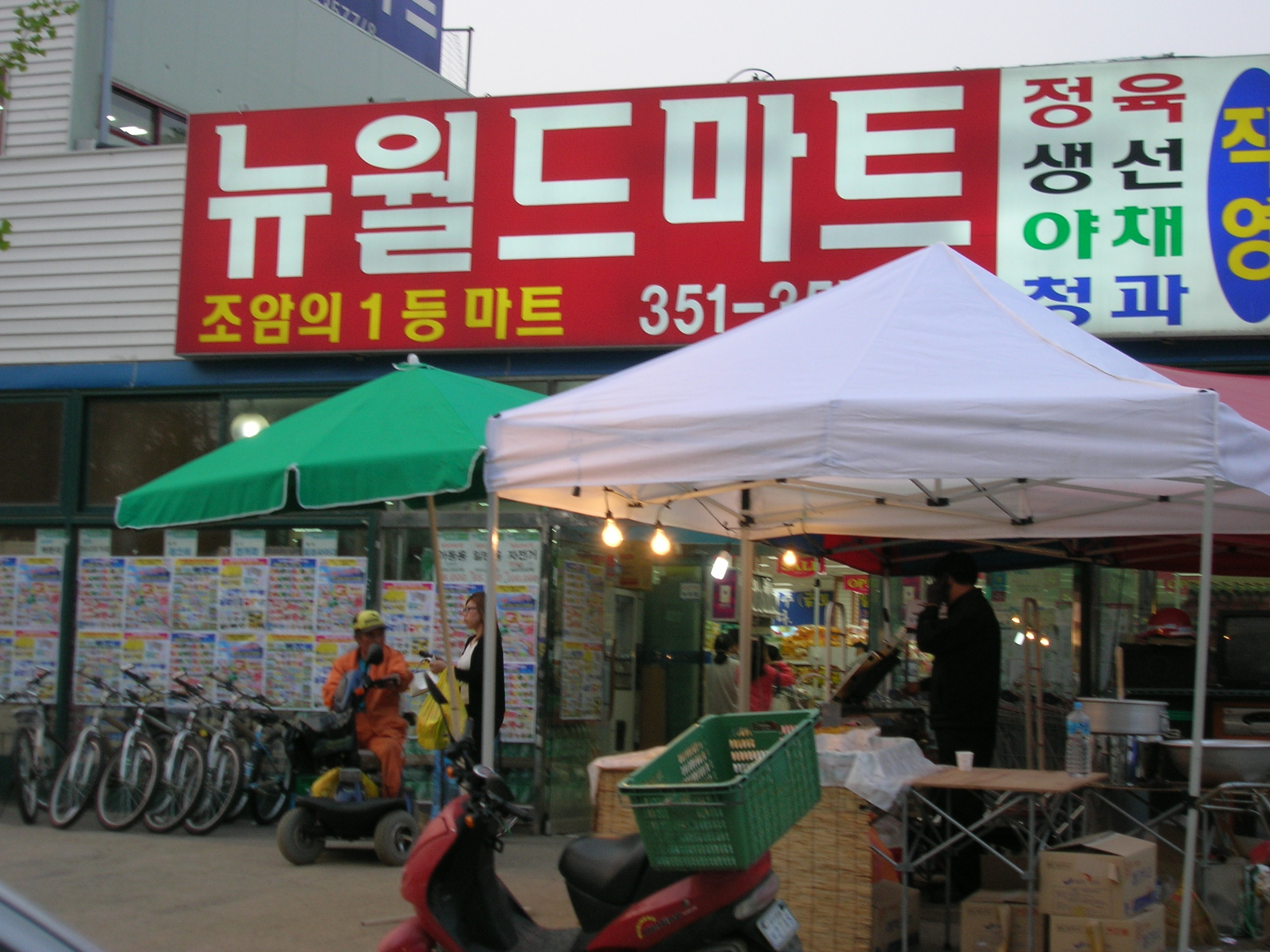
Joam New World Mart

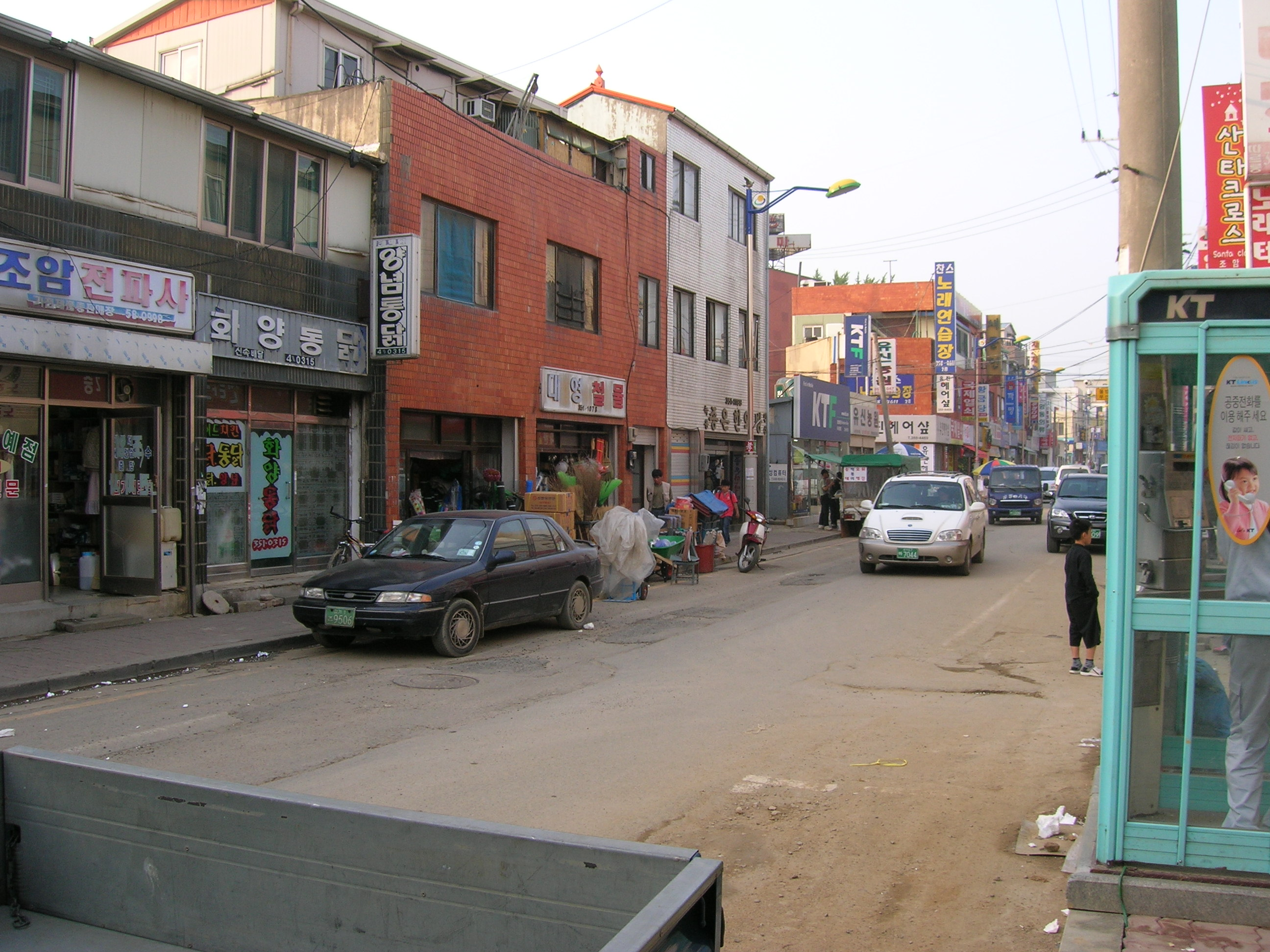
Main shopping street

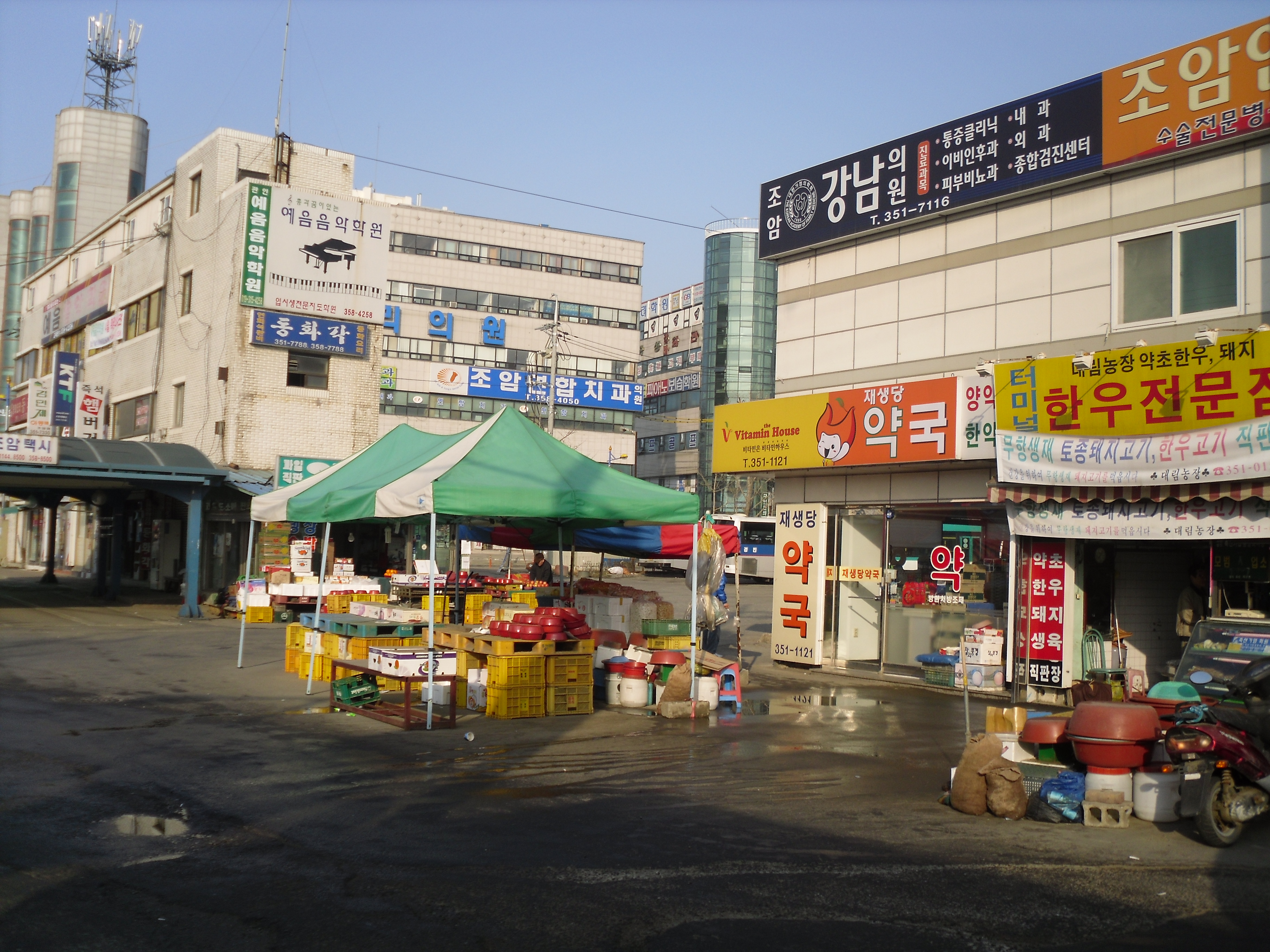
Market & shops

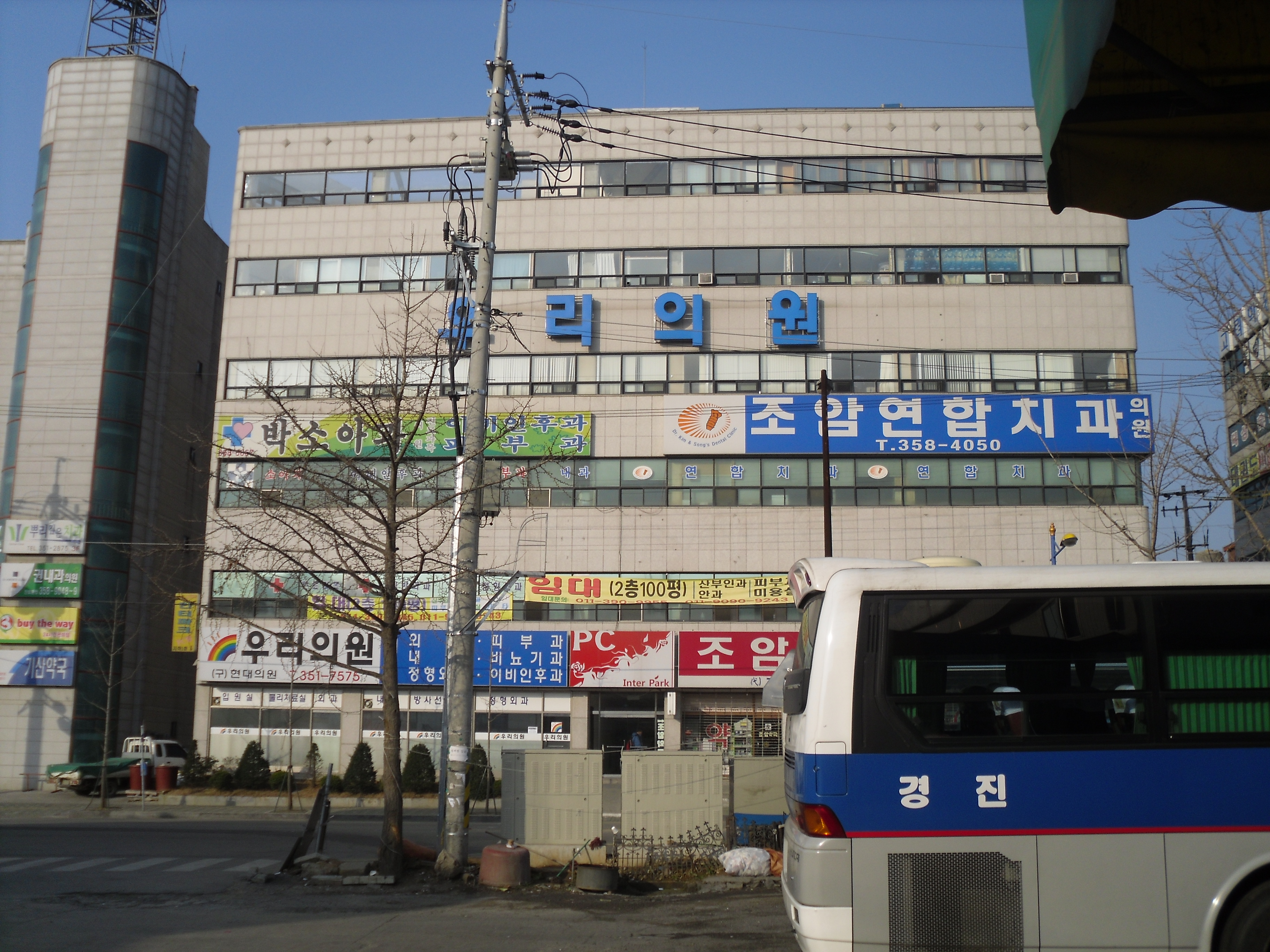
Clinic, dentist and others

== Entertainment and recreation ==
Joam has several bars and pubs that serve a variety of Korean draft beers. Other popular entertainment includes karaoke bars, several of which can be found on Joam's main street and in Joam Plaza. Joam has many restaurants. These include several Korean diners that serve popular dishes such as dak galbi, bibimbap and kimbap. These dishes are commonly served with kimchi and other banchan(side dishes).

Joam is also home to a mountaintop park and exercise area. This park has an excellent view of the town, a picnic area, and exercise equipment. Ujeong-eup Town Hall provides an exercise facility and local library, and hosts local events. A small lake and fishing resort is also located just outside town.

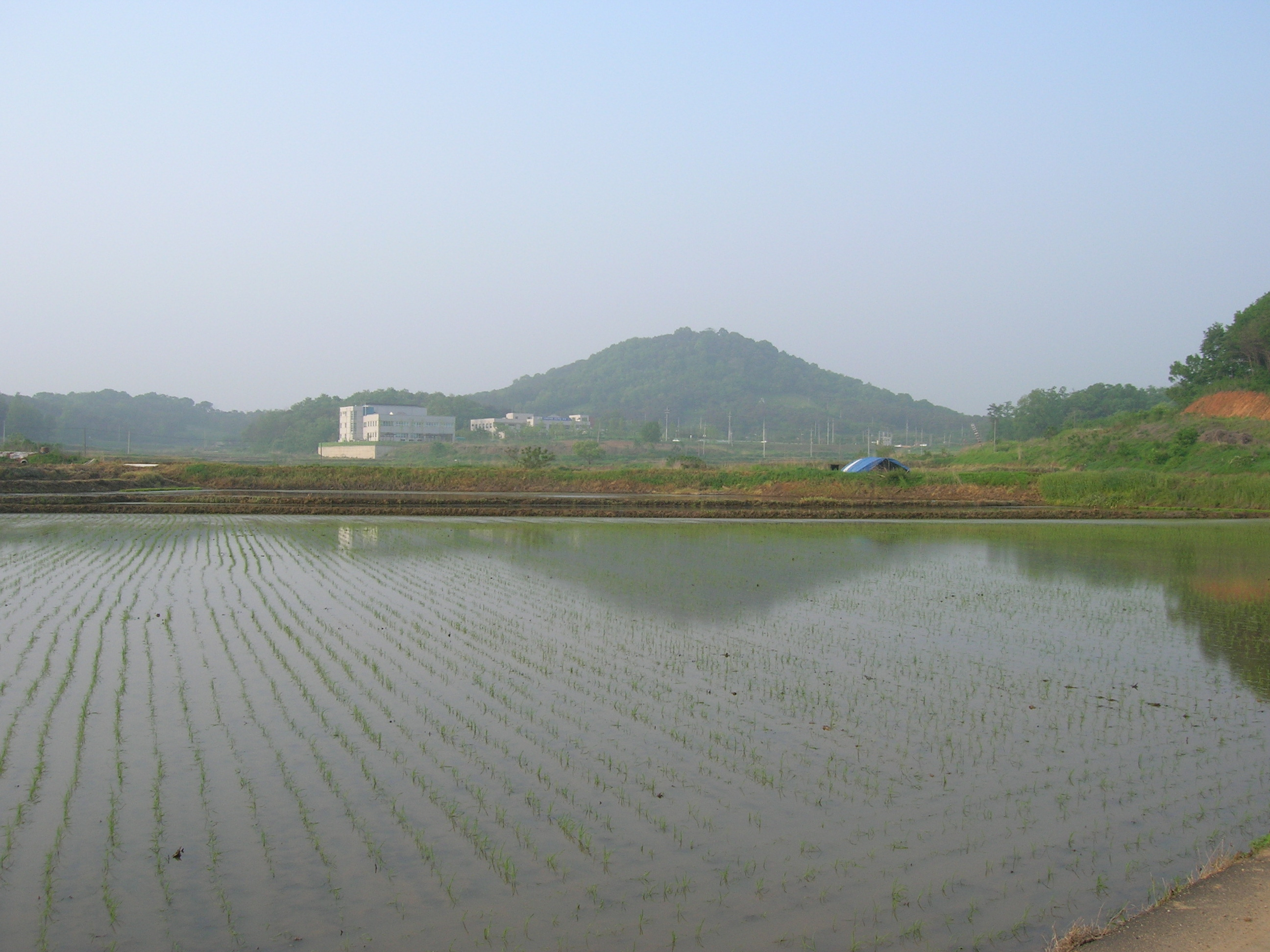
Ujeong-eup Town Hall seen from across rice fields

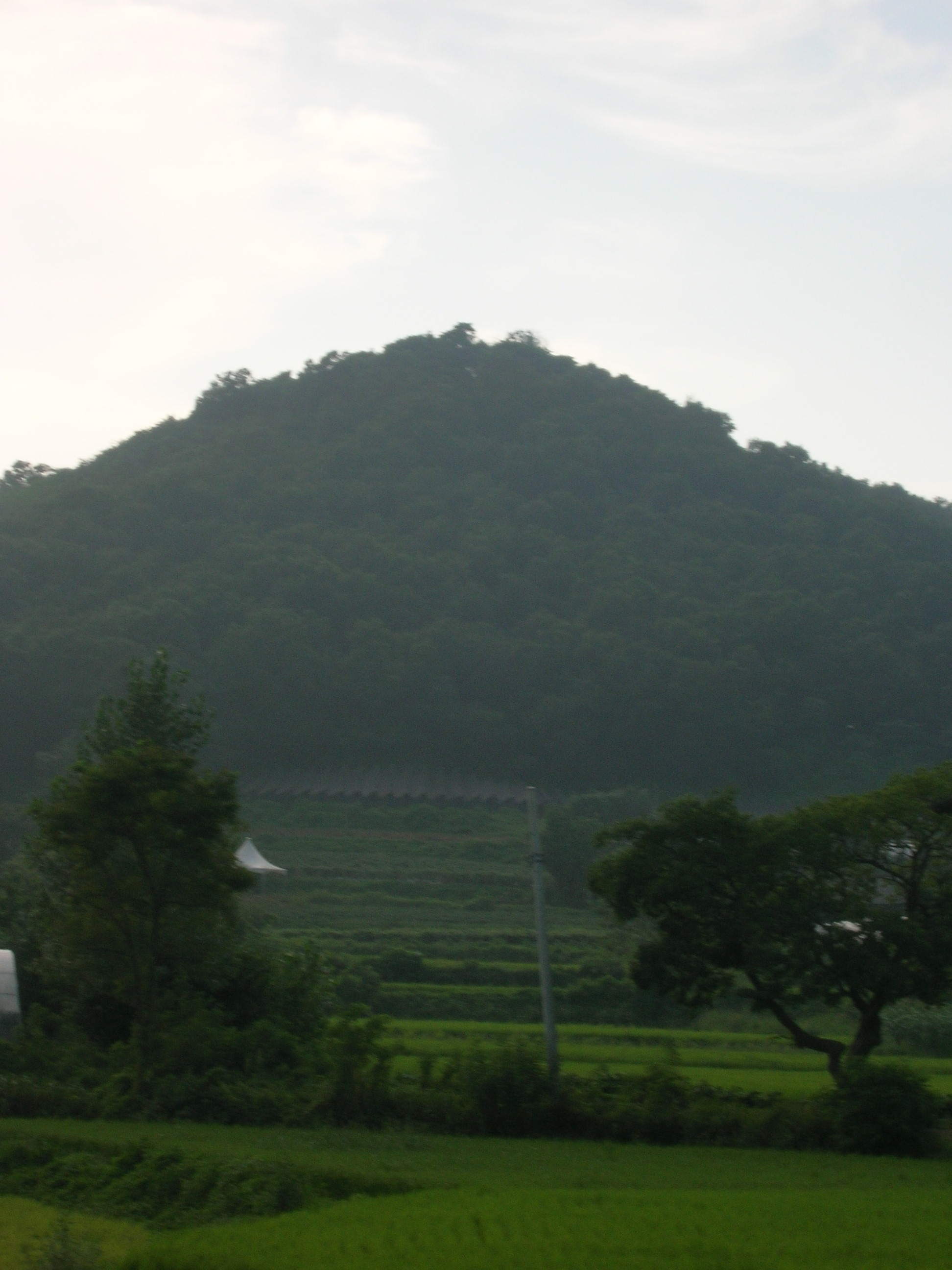
Hilltop park in Joam.

== Places of worship ==
Joam, like the rest of South Korea, is home to both Christian and Buddhist places of worship. Joam has several churches, both Protestant and Catholic, which can often be recognized by their lit steeples. There is also a Buddhist temple at the base of the hilltop park.

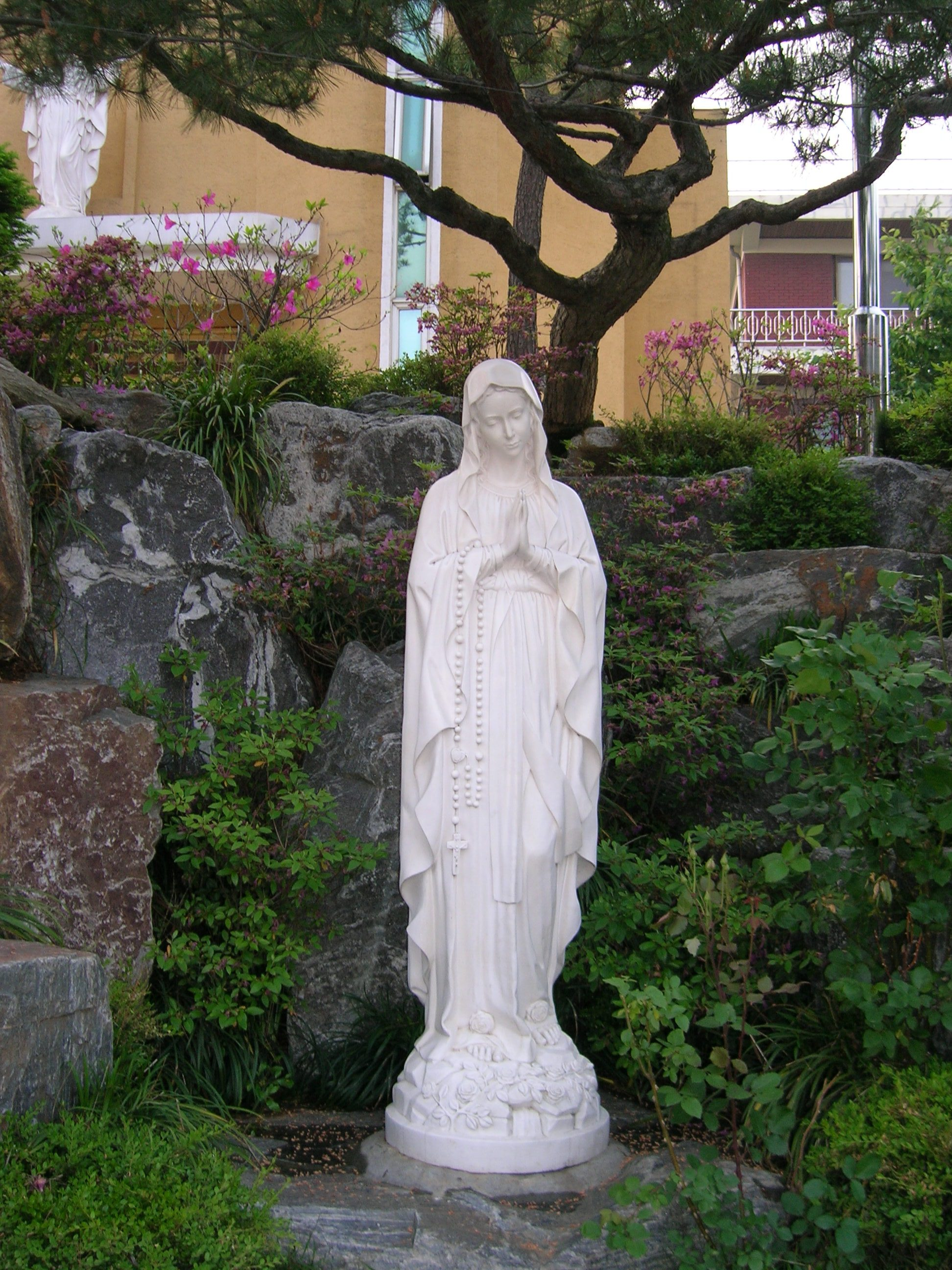
A Catholic church in downtown Joam

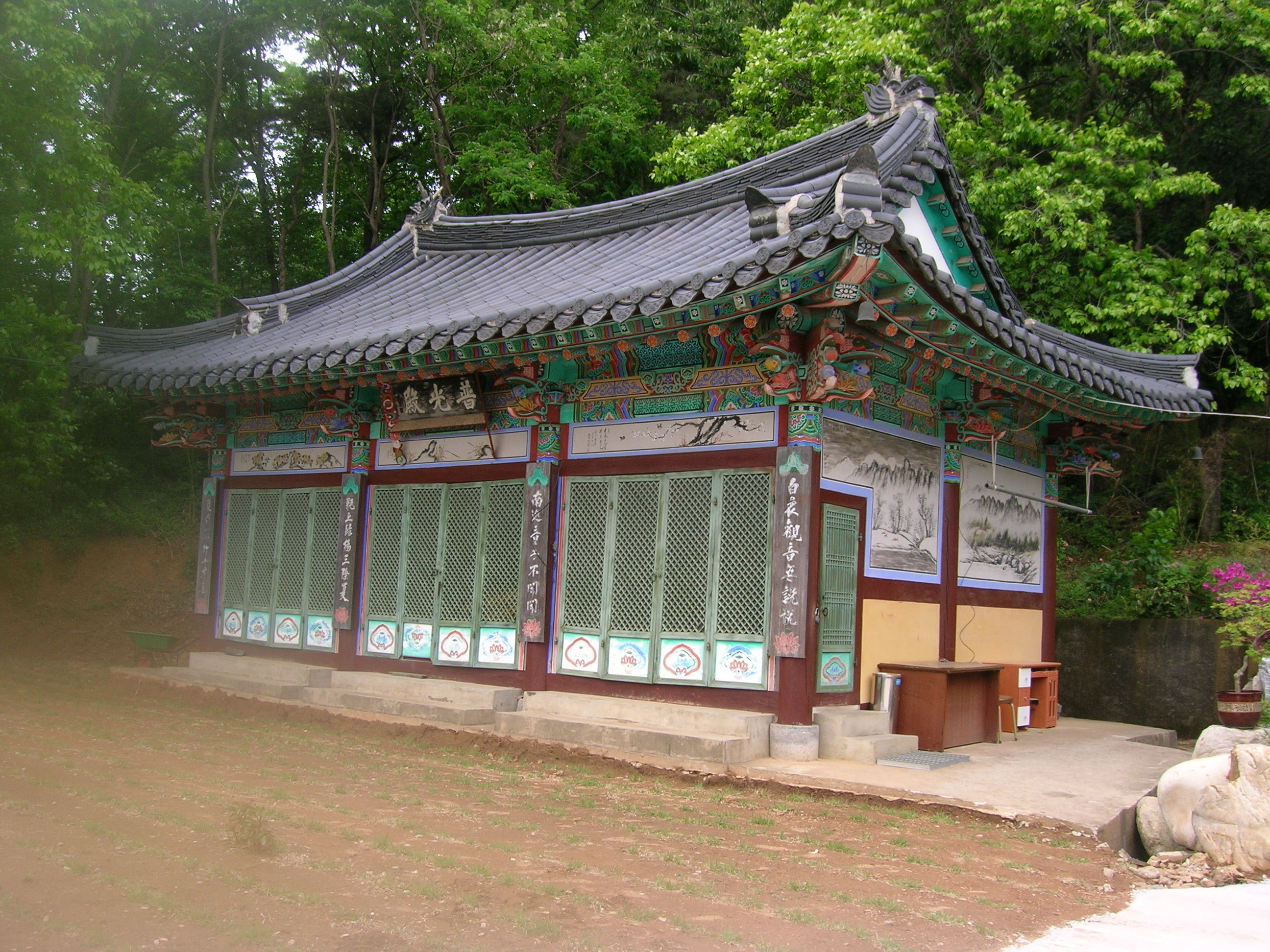
A Buddhist shrine just outside town

== Climate ==
Located in the midwest area of the Korean Peninsula, the town is in a transitional area between the warmer and more humid south and the cooler continental north. Temperatures in winter are low along the coast since Joam is located in the lower plains close to the Yellow Sea, where the water is shallow. Therefore, Joam's climate is classified as midwest coastal. Winters are generally dry, sunny and cold with temperatures in January averaging below freezing. Summer is hot and humid, and is the wettest season. Spring and fall are the mildest and most comfortable seasons and are also periods of flowering and agricultural activity. Because of Joam's abundant natural and agricultural scenery, spring and fall afford the best opportunities to appreciate the scenery around Joam.

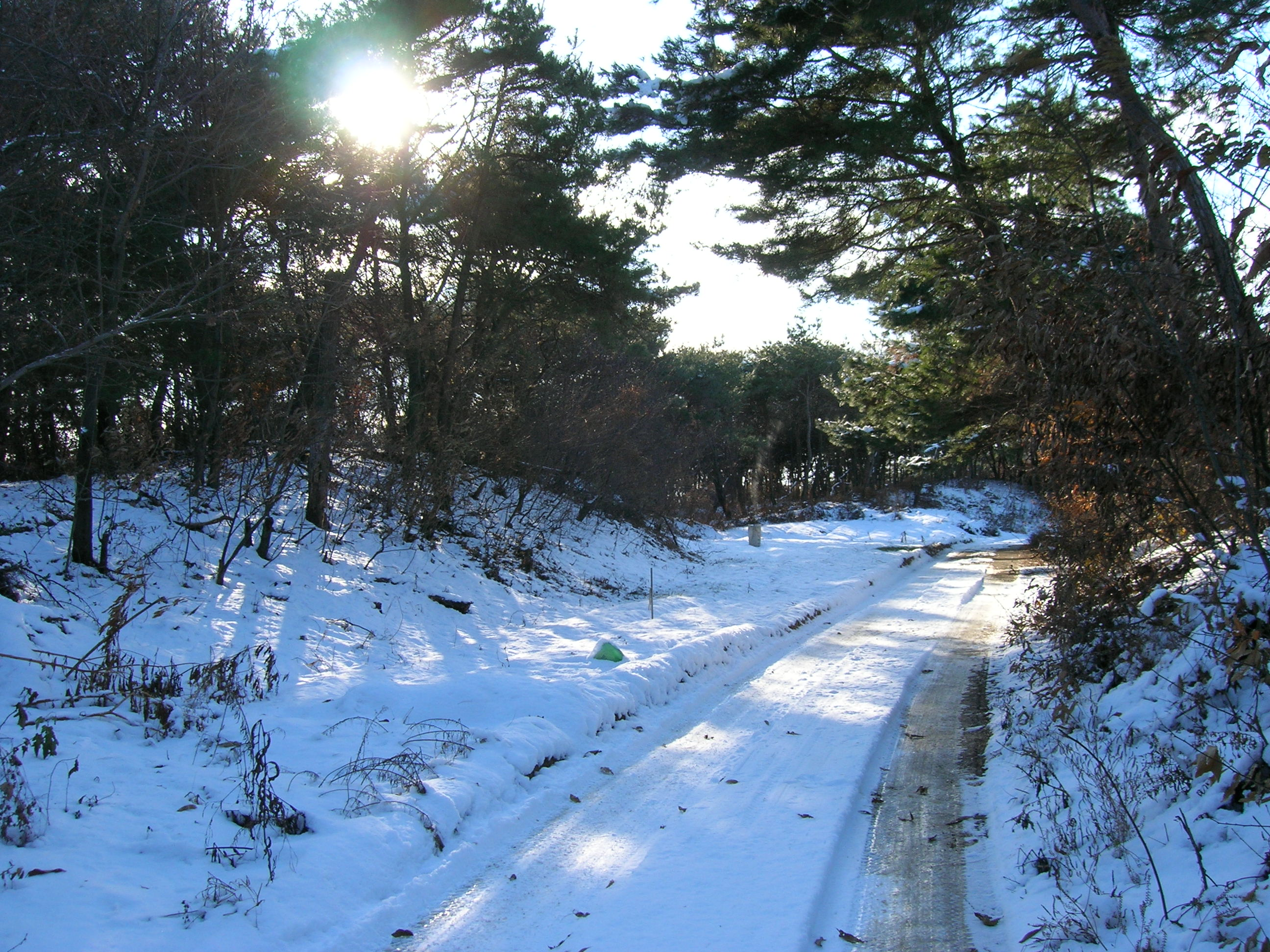
A country road after a winter snowfall

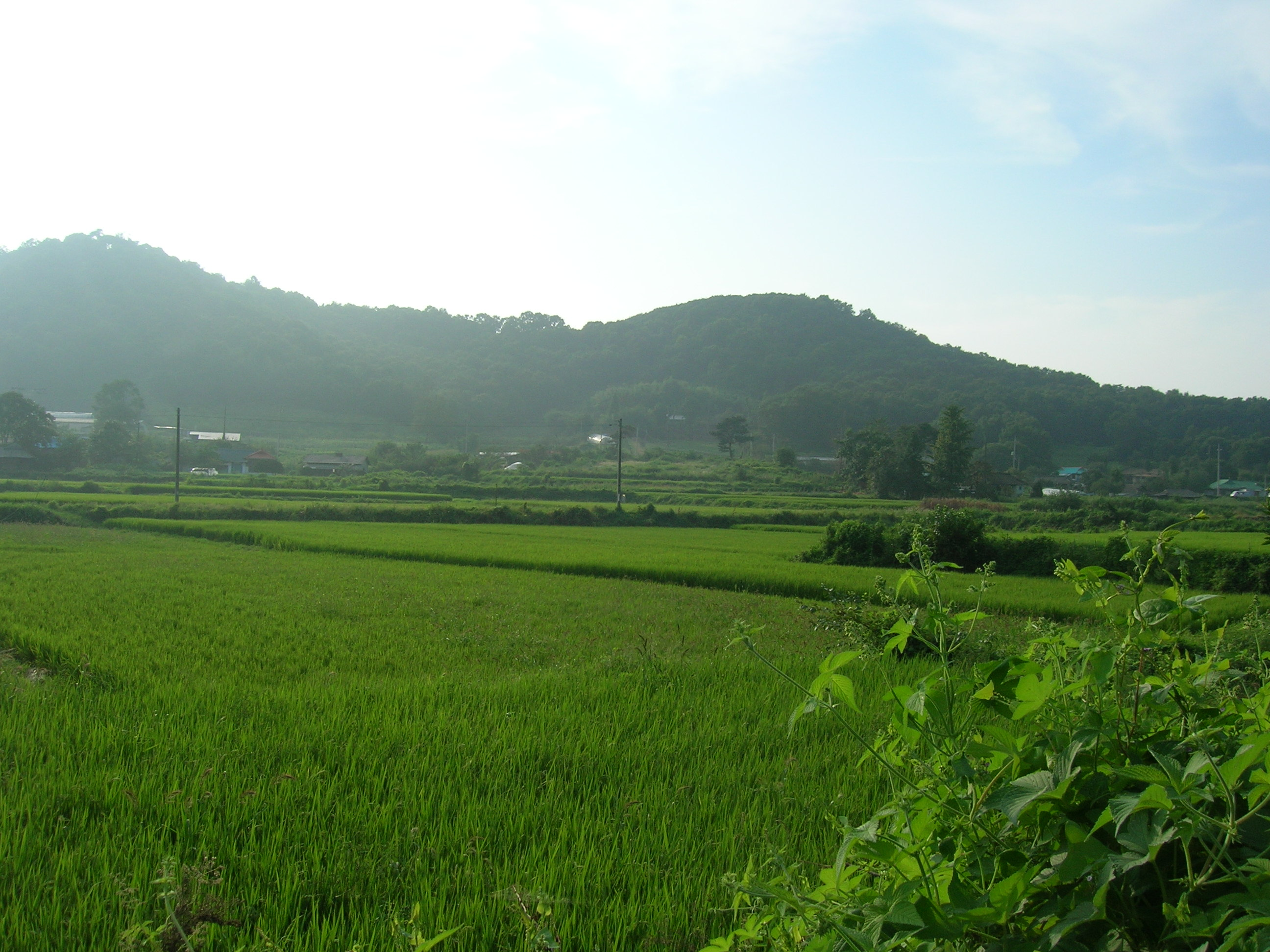
Summers are hot, humid and very lush

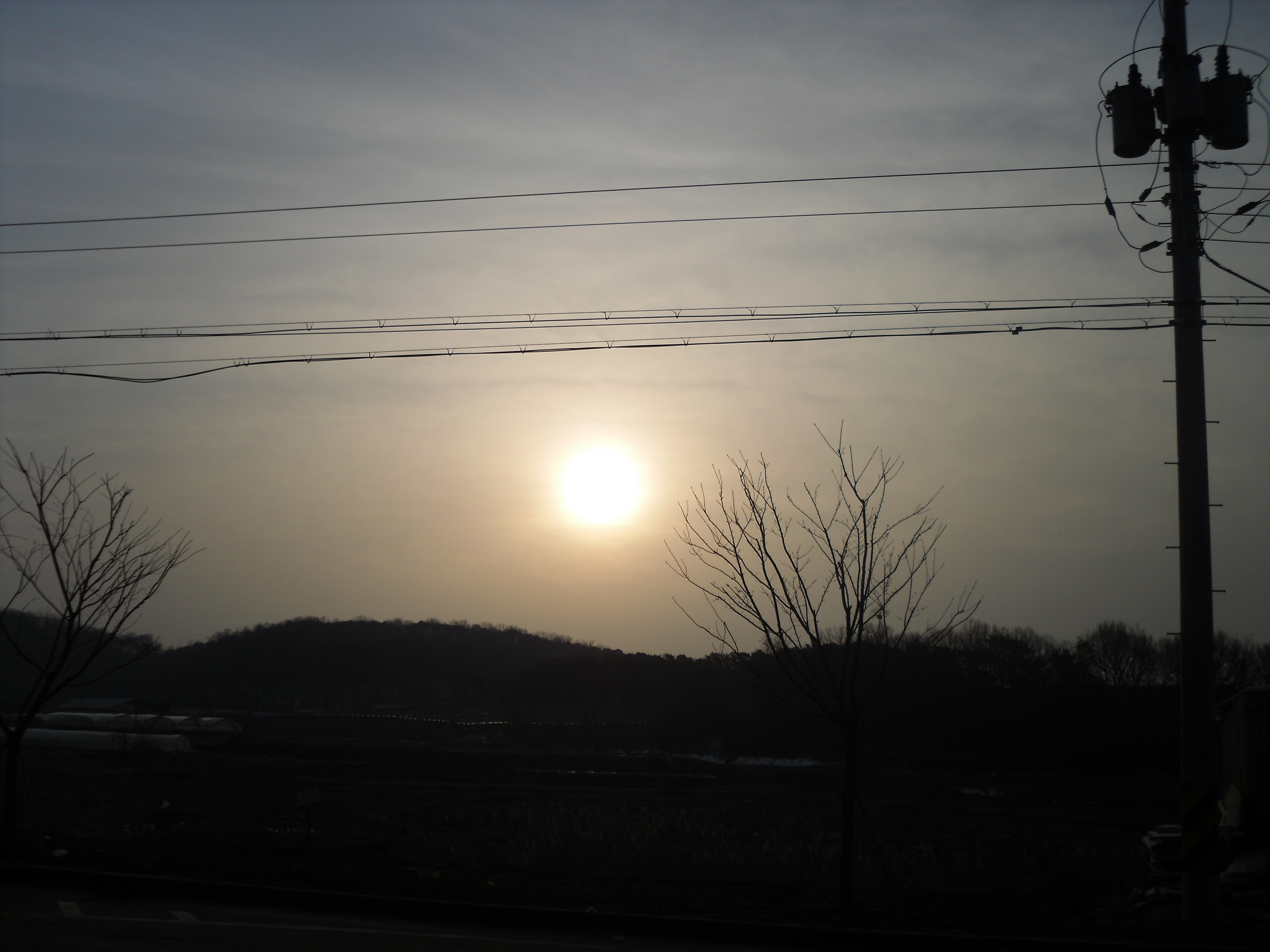
Spring sunrise in Joam

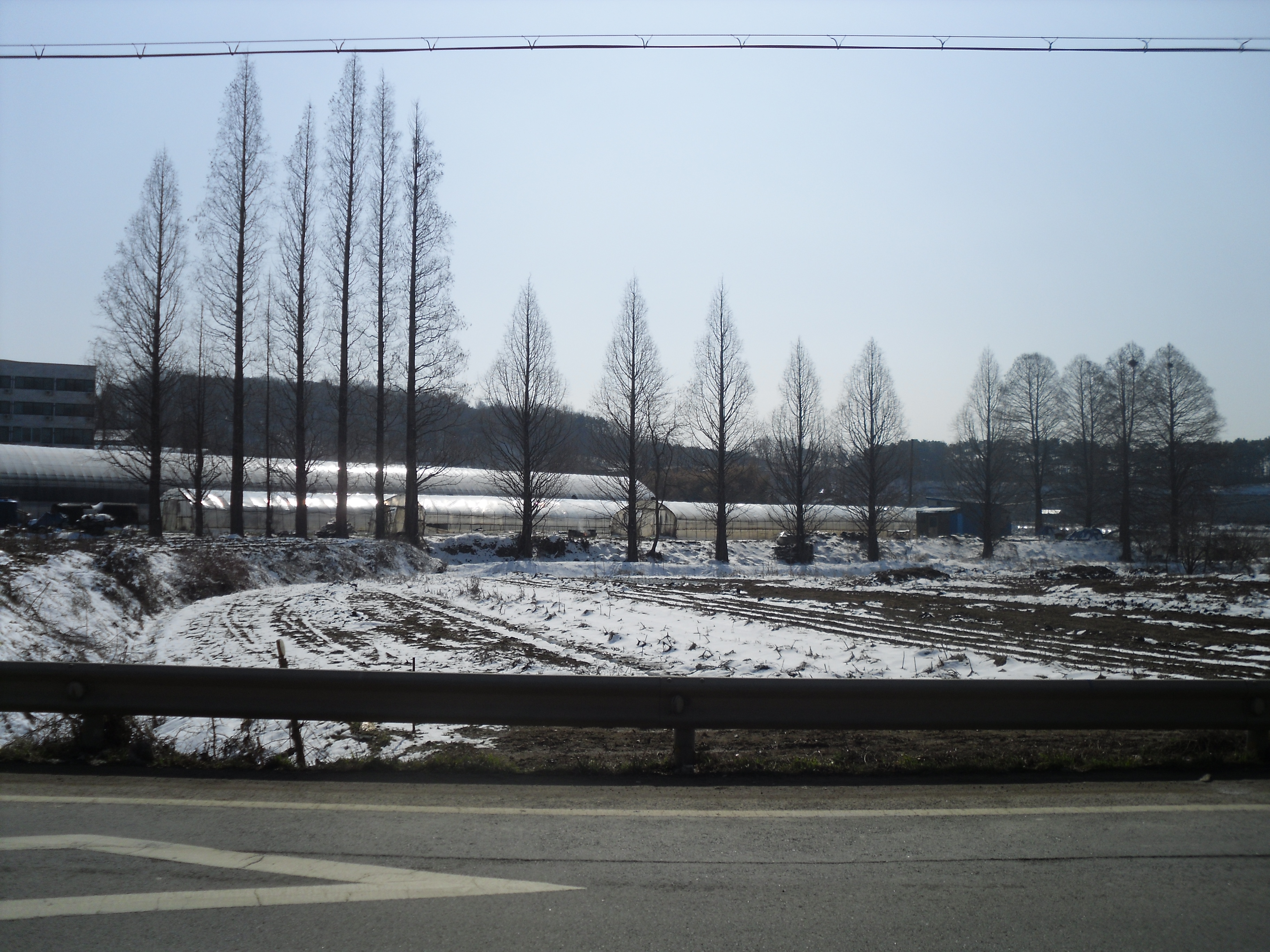
Snow-coated fields of Joam in spring

== Nature and Agriculture ==
The area surrounding Joam is primarily agricultural with numerous patches of forested land. The countryside is home to many pine and leafy trees, various flowers and birds, and edible plants that are collected by the local population. Many farms in the area are operated by small holders and families farming rice in fields and vegetables in greenhouses. In the late summer drying peppers are a common sight in front of many farmhouses. In the autumn, rice is harvested in vast quantities, as is celebrated at the Chuseok festival. In the winter, agricultural scraps are burned in the fields to restore nutrients and clear the way for spring planting. In the spring, the fields are flooded and planted with new rice seedlings which sprout first in greenhouses. The area is also home to many older traditional farmhouses that give it a unique historical flavor. When walking the many paths and country roads around Joam many traditional burial mounds can be seen. These grass-covered tombs are the focus of traditional ceremonies at Chuseok and Korean New Year.

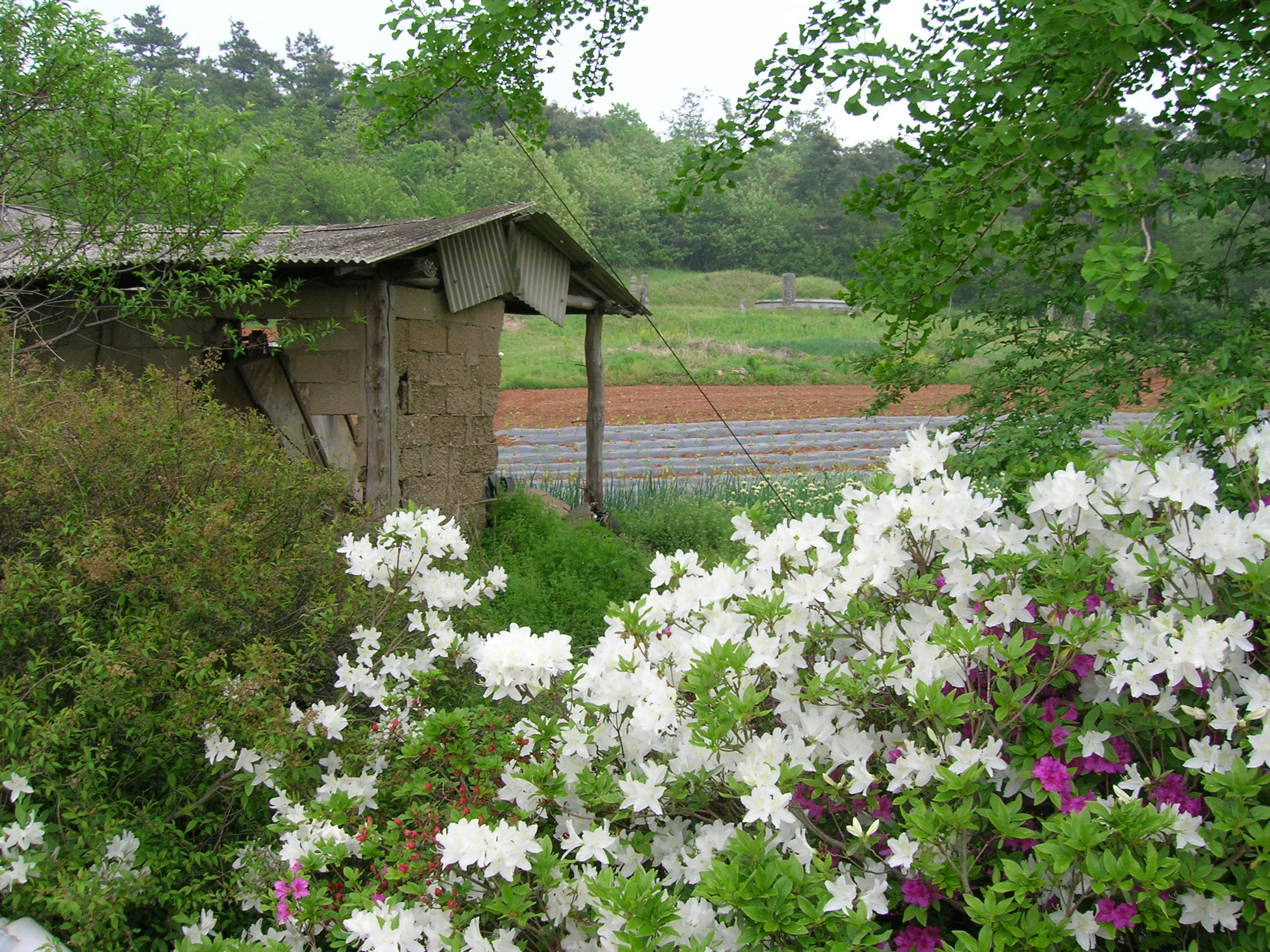
Spring flowers on a farm.

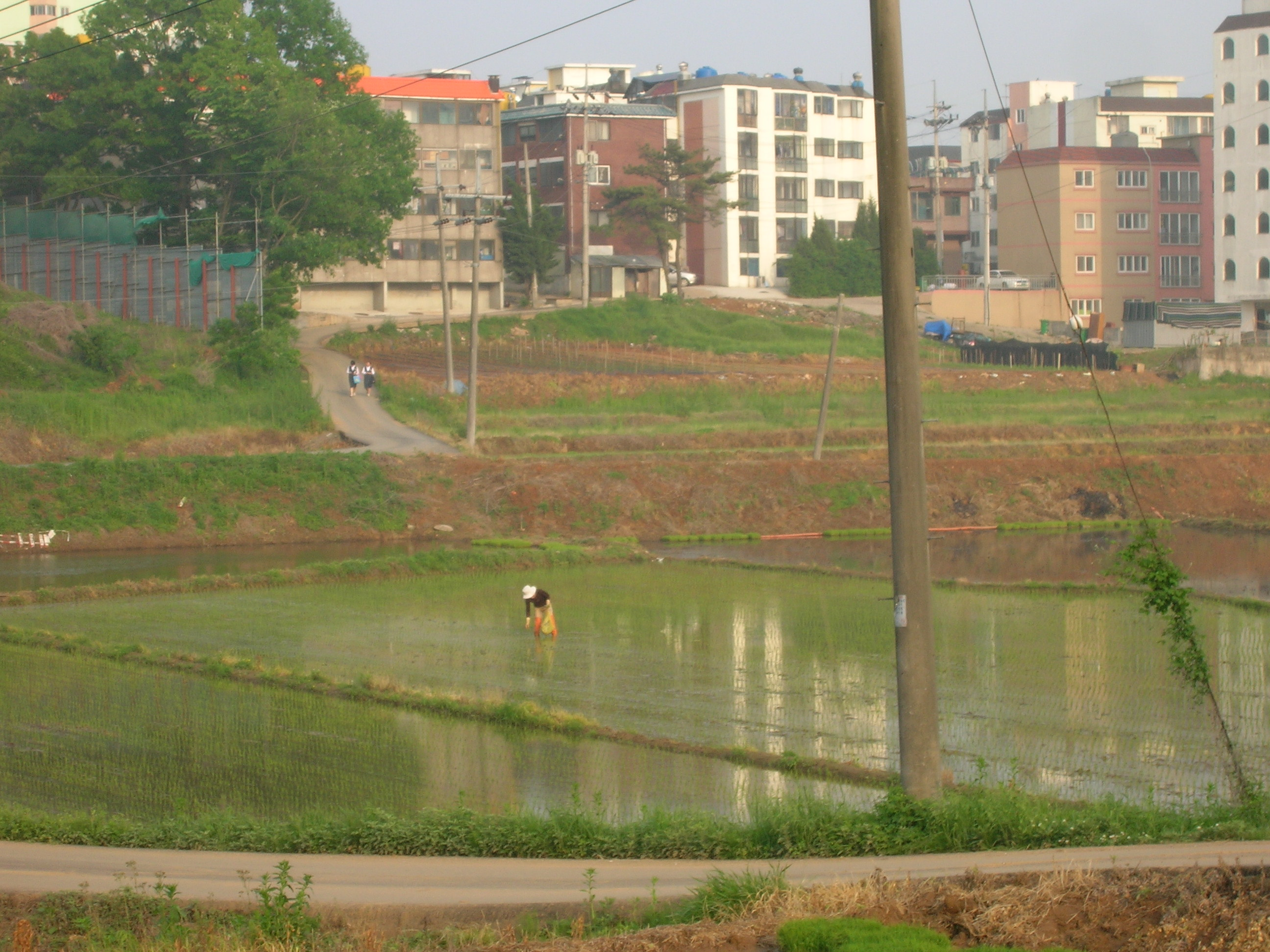
Tending rice seedlings in spring

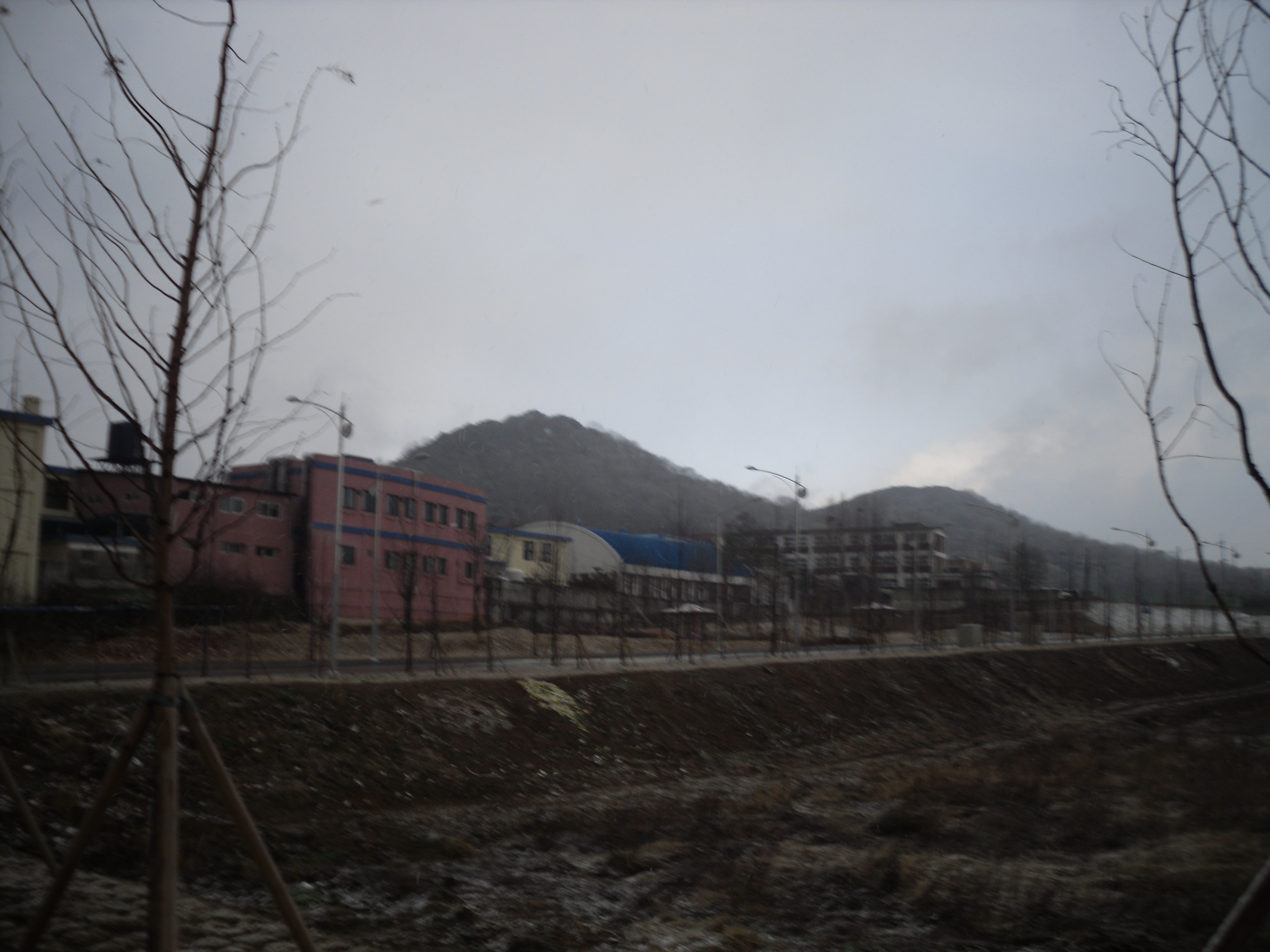
Mountains behind Samgoe High School
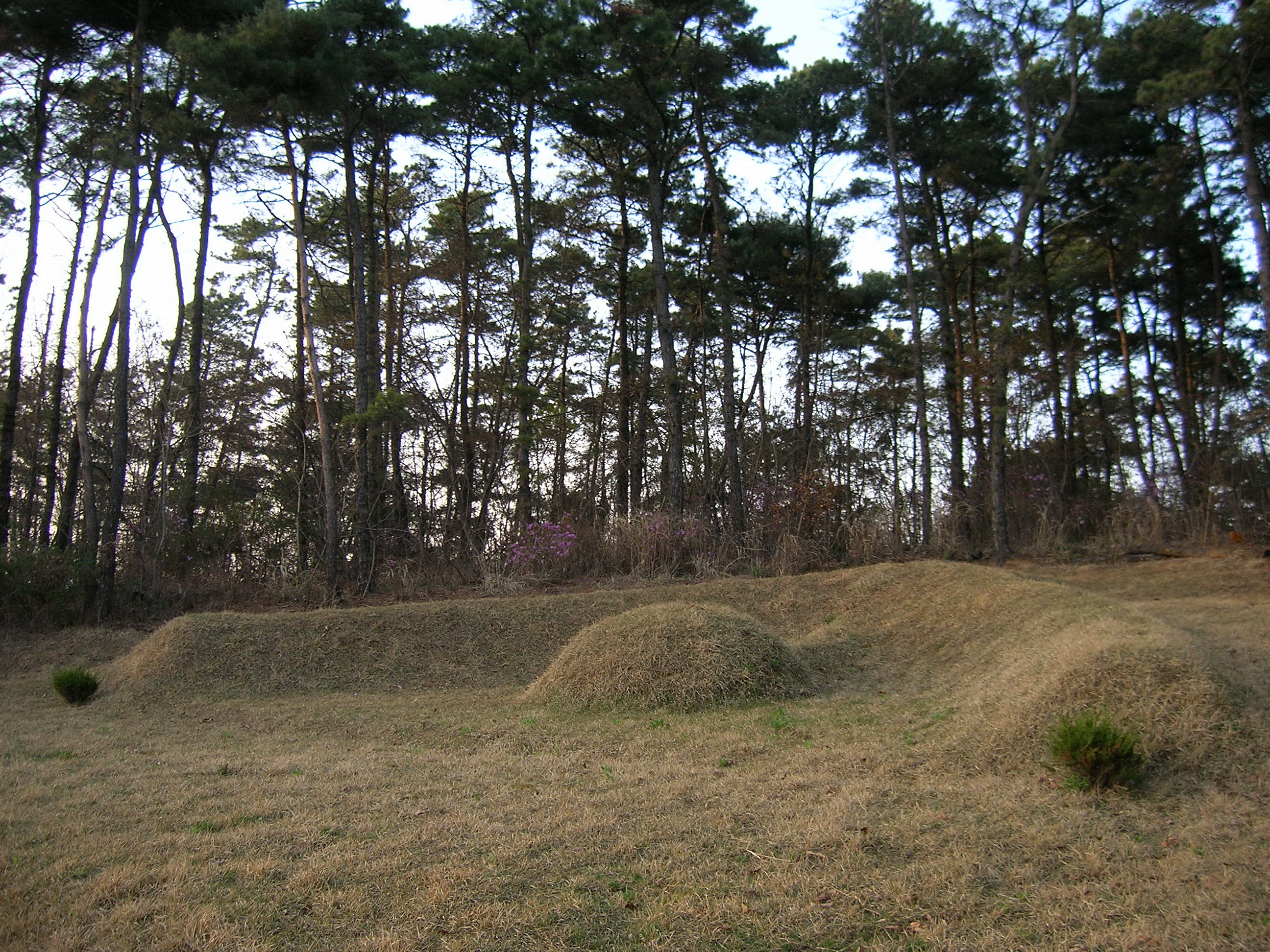
One of many burial mounds found around Joam

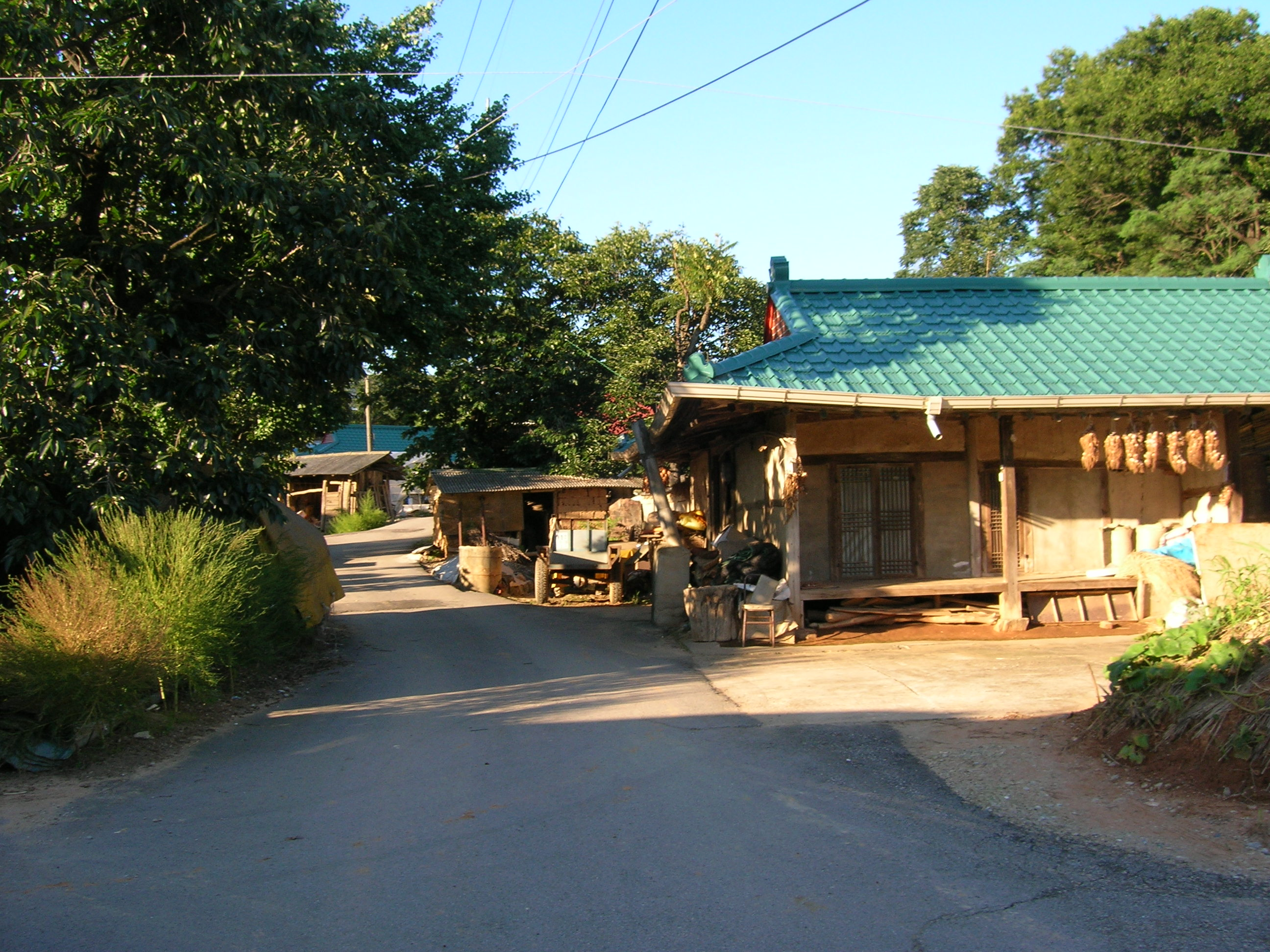
A traditional farmhouse

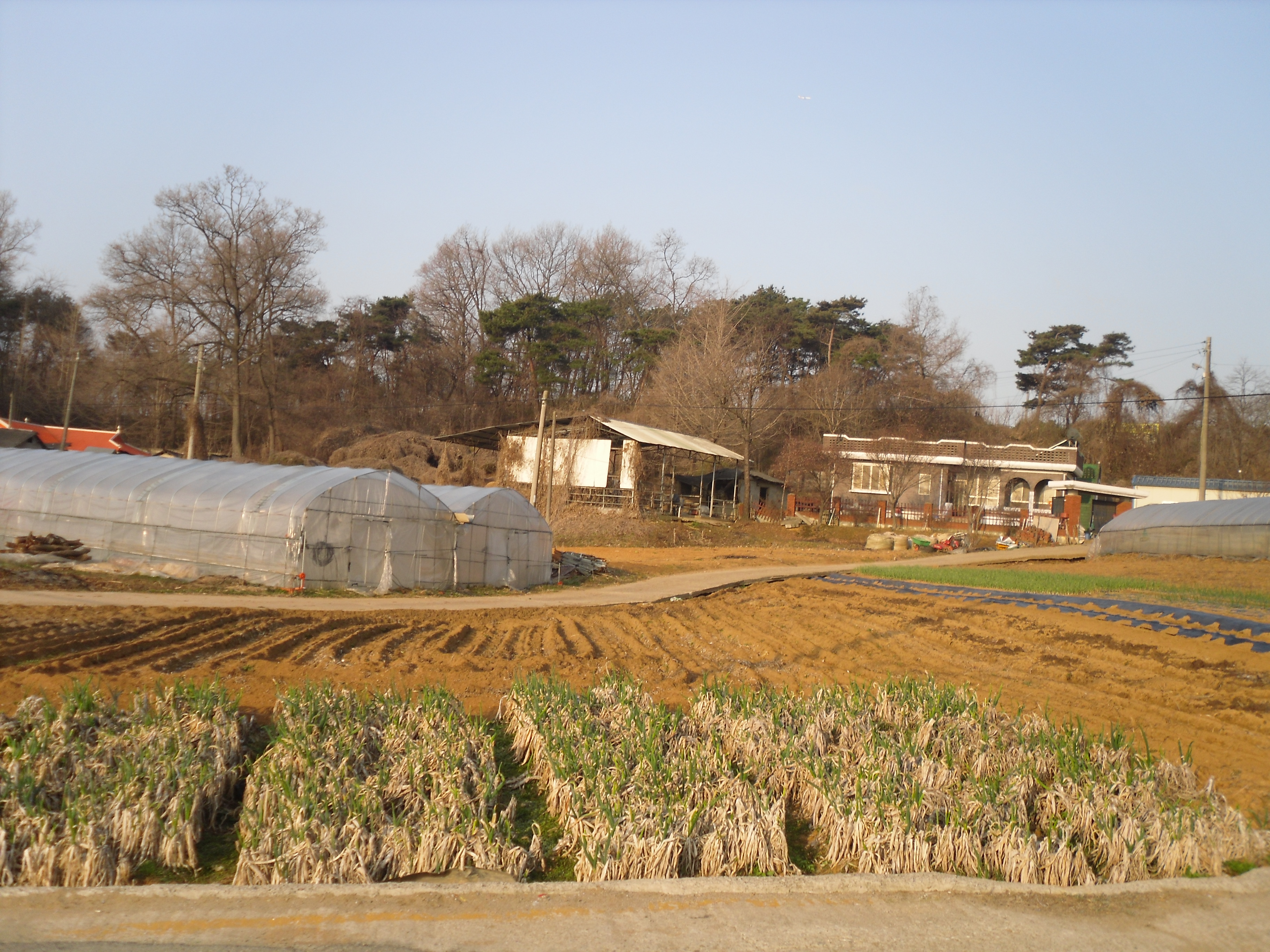
Typical farm in Joam

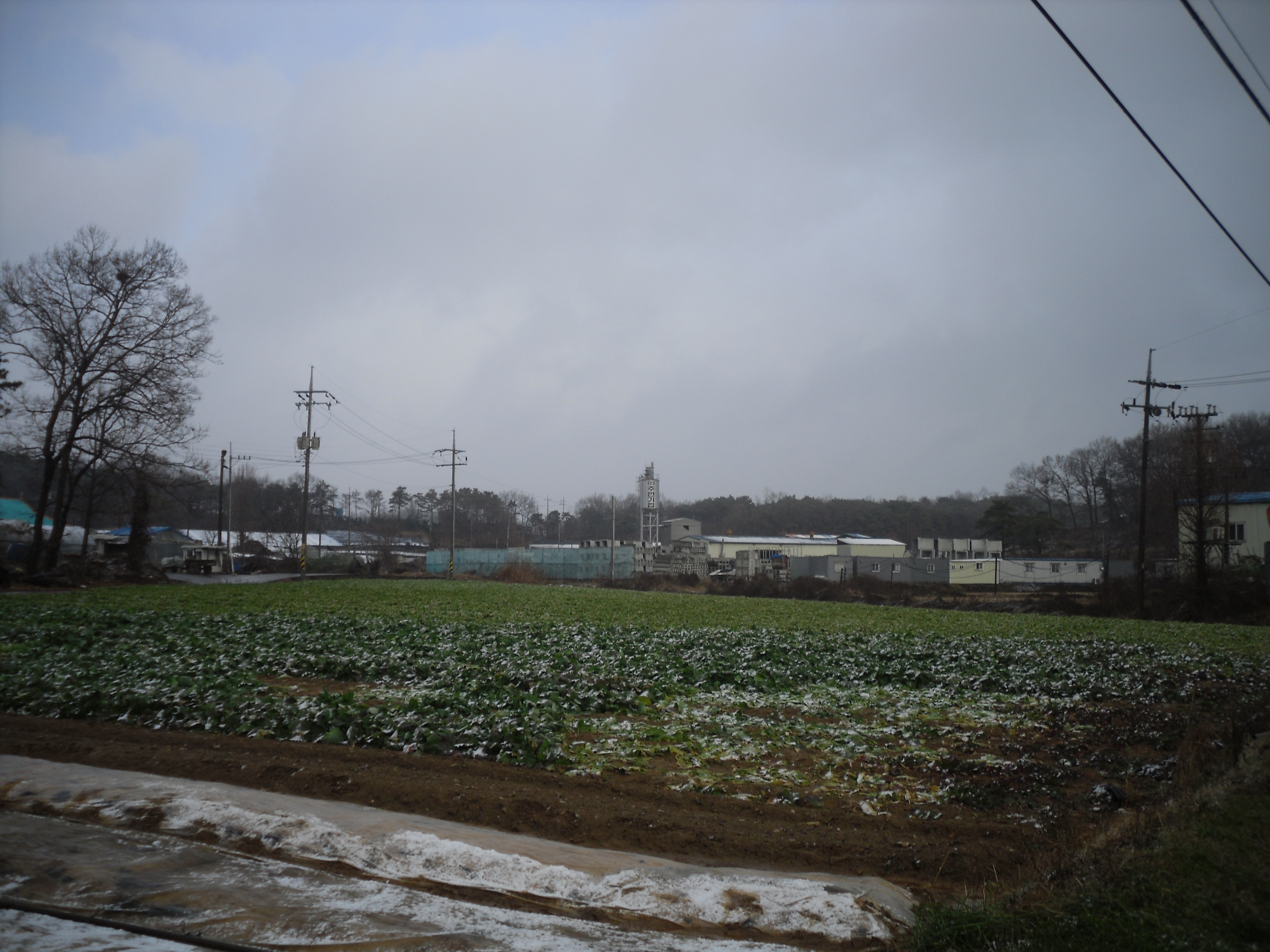
Farms in Joam

== Schools ==
Joam has several public and private schools. Public schools include elementary schools, both boys' and girls' middle schools and a high school. The town also has several private academies. Students attending these receive extra education in subjects ranging from math and music to taekwondo and English.

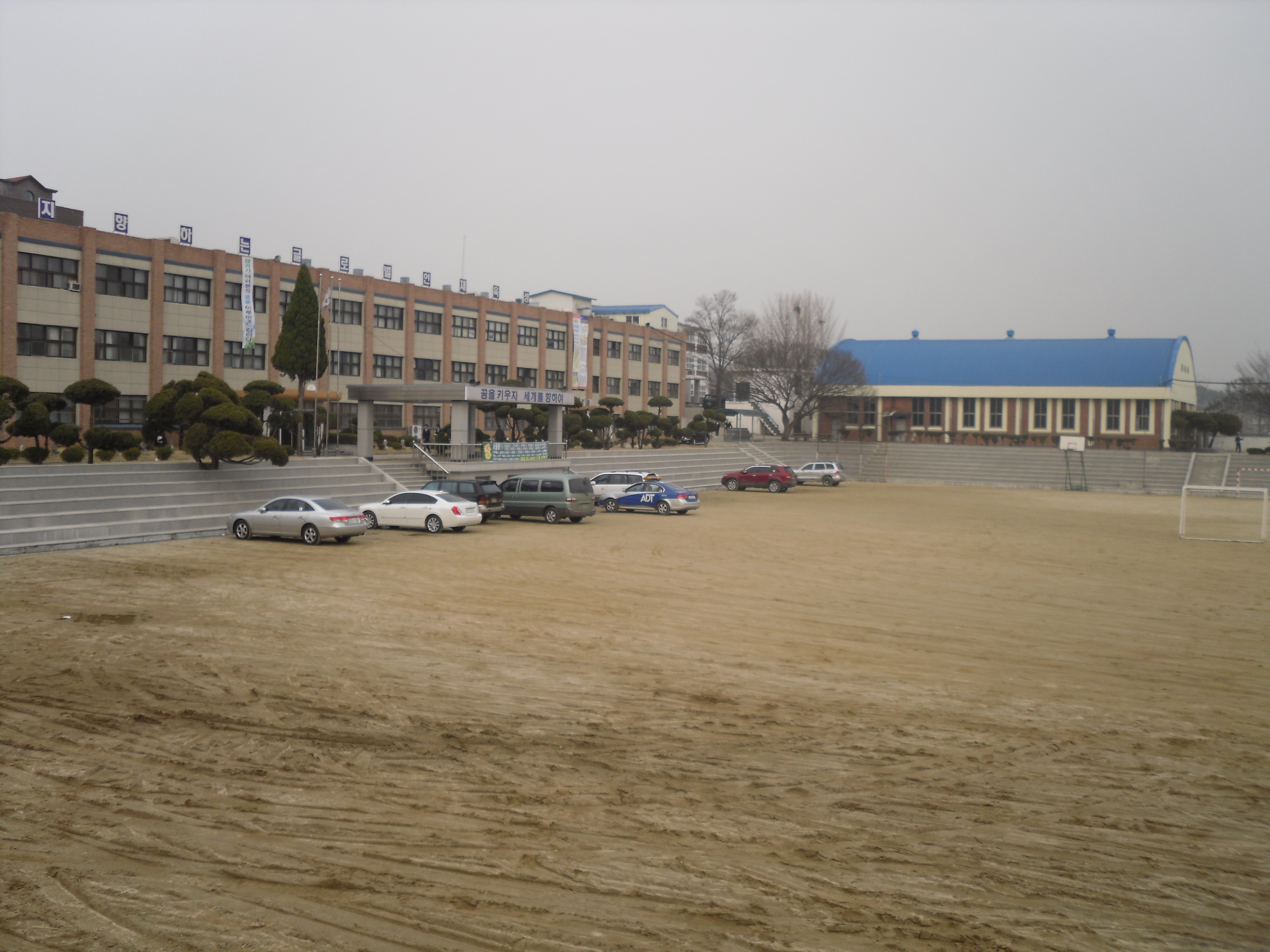
Samgoe High School 삼괴고등학교

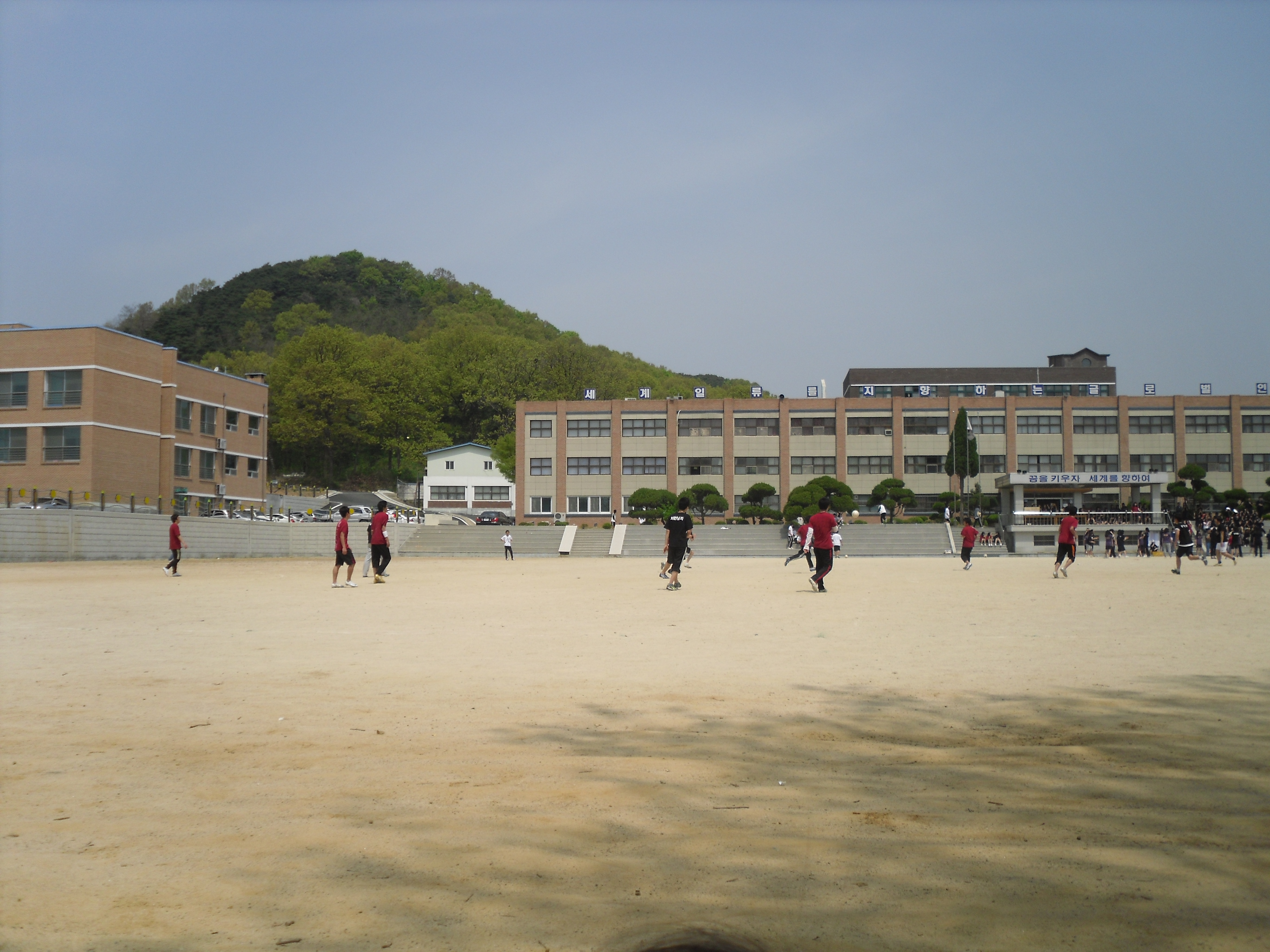
Samgoe High School 삼괴고등학교

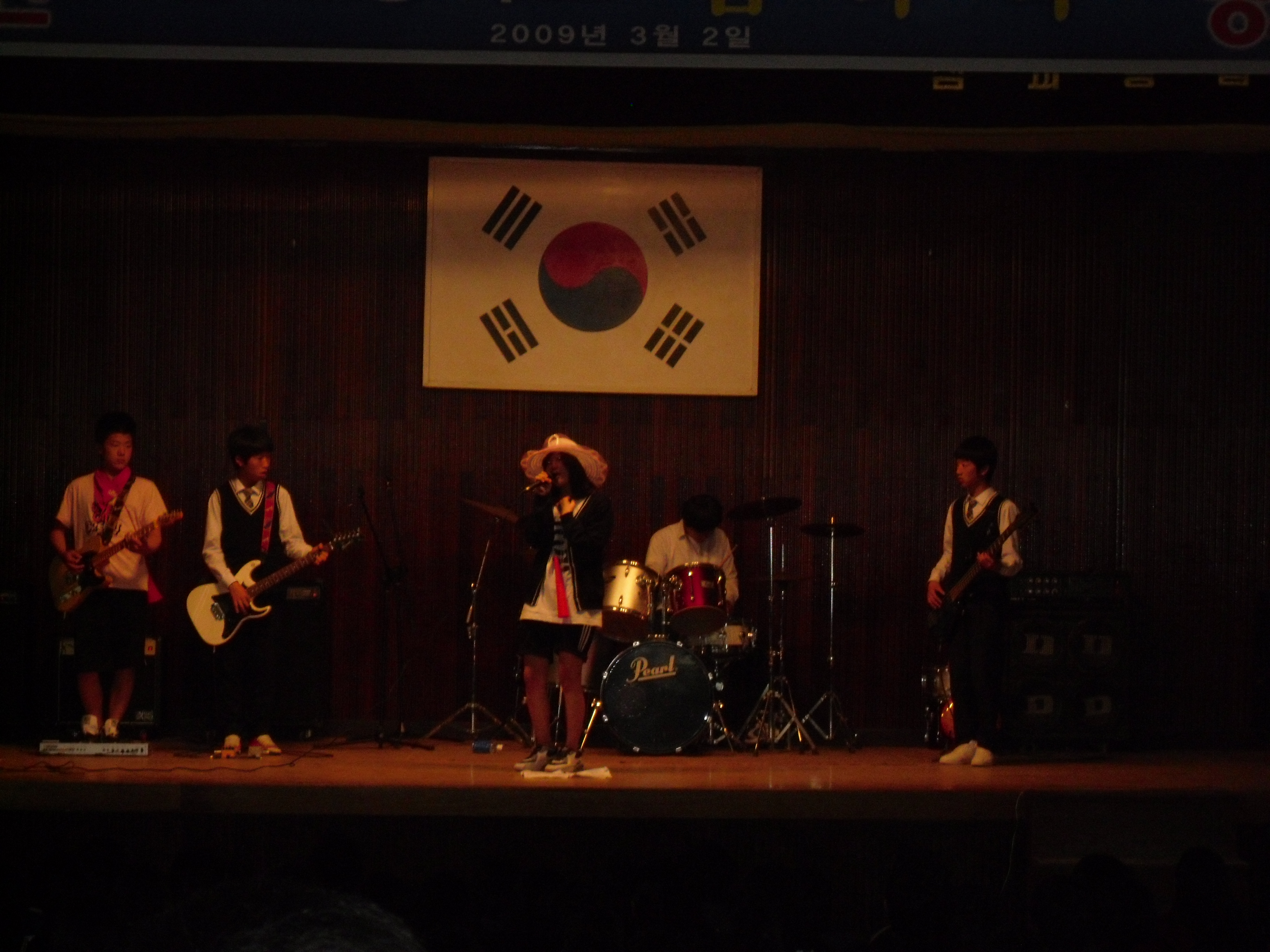
Samgoe High School Sports Day Singing Competition 2009

== surrounding living environment ==
- It is scheduled to be built in Joam-ri, Namyang-eup, Hwaseong-si, Gyeonggi-do, and the apartment complex consists of a large complex that can accommodate a total of 2,329 households.

Hwaseong Seohee Star Hills, built by Seohee Construction, is an apartment for a local housing association member. Access to Songsan Mado IC and Pyeongtaek-Siheung Expressway makes it easy to move around Seoul and nearby Ansan in less than 10 minutes if you use National Road 77. Subsequently, the second outer ring road connecting Incheon to Dongducheon is scheduled to open, and once Shinansan Station and the West Coast double-track train are opened, it is possible to reach Yeouido, the financial center, within 30 minutes.
