= Dongtan =

Dongtan may refer to:

- Dongtan, Shanghai, China
- Dongtan, Hwaseong, South Korea
- Dongtan District, South Korea
- Đồng Tân, Hiệp Hòa District, Bắc Giang Province, Vietnam

== See also ==
- Dontan
