= Bongdam =

- Town
- Location in South Korea
- Coordinates: 37°13′12″N 126°56′58″E
- Country: South Korea
- Region: Sudogwon
- Province: Gyeonggi
- City: Hwaseong
- District: Hyohaeng District
- Administrative divisions: 16 ri

Area
  - Total: 42.703 km^{2} (16.488 sq mi)

Population (January 2011)
  - Total: 67,694
  - Density: 1,585.2/km^{2} (4,106/sq mi)
  - Dialect: Seoul

Korean name
- Hangul: 봉담읍
- Hanja: 峰潭邑
- RR: Bongdam-eup
- MR: Pongdam-ŭp

Bongdam is a town in the city of Hwaseong in South Korea. Covering over 4000 hectares, the town is the focus of a planned community, primarily as a commuter town for the bordering city of Suwon.

A town located in the midwestern part of Hwaseong-si, Gyeonggi-do. It is bordered by Jeongnam-myeon, Gian-dong, and Annyeong-dong to the east, Bibong-myeon and Paltan-myeon to the west, Hyangnam-eup (Balan) to the south, and Maesong-myeon and Omokcheon-dong, Gwonseon-gu, Suwon-si to the north.

== History ==
- April 1, 1914: Suwon-gun (수원군)'s Sambong-myeon (삼봉면 - 三峰面) and Galdam-myeon (갈담면 - 葛潭面) were combined, forming Bongdam-myeon (봉담면 - 峰潭面), a town of 15 villages.
- August 14, 1949: As Suwon-eup was raised in status to Suwon-bu, the remainder of Suwon-gun was renamed Hwaseong-gun. (Suwon-bu became a city soon afterwards.)
- February 15, 1983: Bibong-myeon's village of Sanggi-ri left Bibong-myeon and became part of Bongdam-myeon, completing the 16 villages which remain in Bongdam today.
- May 1992: Bongdam-myeon's council office moved from 31-3 Sang-ri to the nearby newly constructed facility at 27-1 Sang-ri.
- April 1, 1998: Bongdam's status was raised from myeon to eup.
- March 21, 2001: Hwaseong's status was raised from gun (county) to si (city).
- March 20, 2008: Much of the housing in Donghwa-ri was cleared for a new housing development.

== Geography ==
Bongdam is bounded to the north-west by the hills of Sambongsan (삼봉산 - 三峰山: 271 m) and Taehaengsan (태행산 - 太行山: 266 m), to the west by Geocheon Reservoir and Geondalsan (건달산 - 建達山: 328 m), to the south-west by Deogu Reservoir and Cheolmasan (철마산 - 鐵馬山: 123 m), to the south-east by Seobongsan (서봉산 - 棲鳳山: 250.3m), to the east by Taebongsan (태봉산 - 太鳳山: 224 m) and Botong Reservoir, and to the north-east by Gogeumsan (고금산 - 古琴山: 87 m) and the city of Suwon. No major streams pass through the town, though its plain is drained in entirety to Sihwa.

== Demographics ==
Bongdam's population is currently increasing, and this is expected to continue as further housing developments are planned. The foreign population stands at 4.6%, approximately double the national average.

== Administrative divisions ==
Bongdam is divided into 16 ri (villages):

- Buncheon-ri (분천리)
- Dangha-ri (당하리)
- Deogu-ri (덕우리)
- Deok-ri (덕리)
- Donghwa-ri (동화리)
- Hagadeung-ri (하가등리)
- Maha-ri (마하리)
- Nae-ri (내리)
- Sanggi-ri (상기리)
- Sang-ri (상리)
- Segok-ri (세곡리)
- Sugi-ri (수기리)
- Suyeong-ri (수영리)
- Wangnim-ri (왕림리)
- Wau-ri (와우리)
- Yu-ri (유리)

== dwelling ==
- Apartment Hanshin Public Bongdam Hanshin - Moved in December 1996
- Bongdam Hanshin The Hue Edu Park - Moved in May 2019
- Shinil Classic Town - Moved in November 1999
- Shinil 2nd Happy Tree - Move in October 2005
- Hosu Village Dongmun Good Morning Hill - Move in March 2008 / Dongmun Construction
- Bongdam I-Park - Move in September 2009 / Hyundai Industrial Development
- Bongdam Hillstate - Move in June 2021
- Bongdam Hillstate Pride City - August 2024

== Education ==
Bongdam is home to six institutes of higher education: the University of Suwon, Hyupsung University, Suwon Catholic University, the Haeran Campus of Suwon Women's University, Jangan College, and Korea National College of Agriculture and Fisheries. The town also has a high school, three middle schools and seven primary schools.

== Transport ==
=== Rail ===
Trains on the former Suin Line used to pass through Suyeong-ri in the far north of Bongdam. The Suin Line is currently being reconstructed and will form part of the Seoul Subway network. It is planned for a station named Bongdam, two stops from Suwon, to be operating by 2012, though this station will be just outside Bongdam, in Suwon's Omokcheon-dong. Also, all KTX trains pass through Bongdam, though the town does not have a station on this line.

=== Road ===
Bongdam has an interchange on combined motorways 17 and 400.

== Culture ==
The Baekje tombs in Maha-ri and other important graves – those of Lee Gon (이곤) in Sang-ri, and Buncheon-ri's tombs of Seo Geojeong (서거정) and Choi Rubaek (최루백), are among the oldest significant remains in Bongdam. There are also two older Buddhist temples: Beopheungsa in Sugi-ri, Bogwangsa in Wangnim-ri.

== Gallery ==
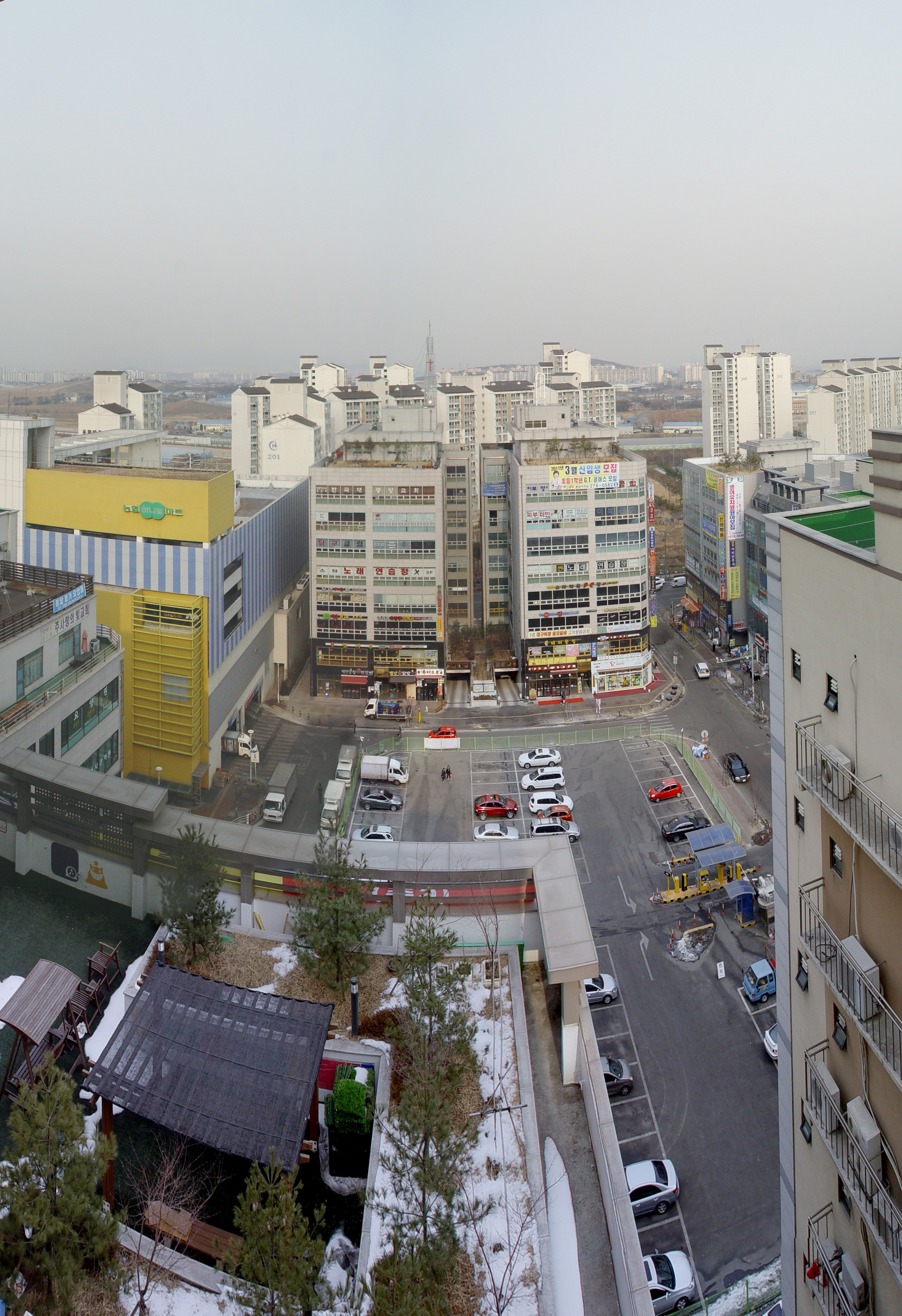
Bongdam's central square

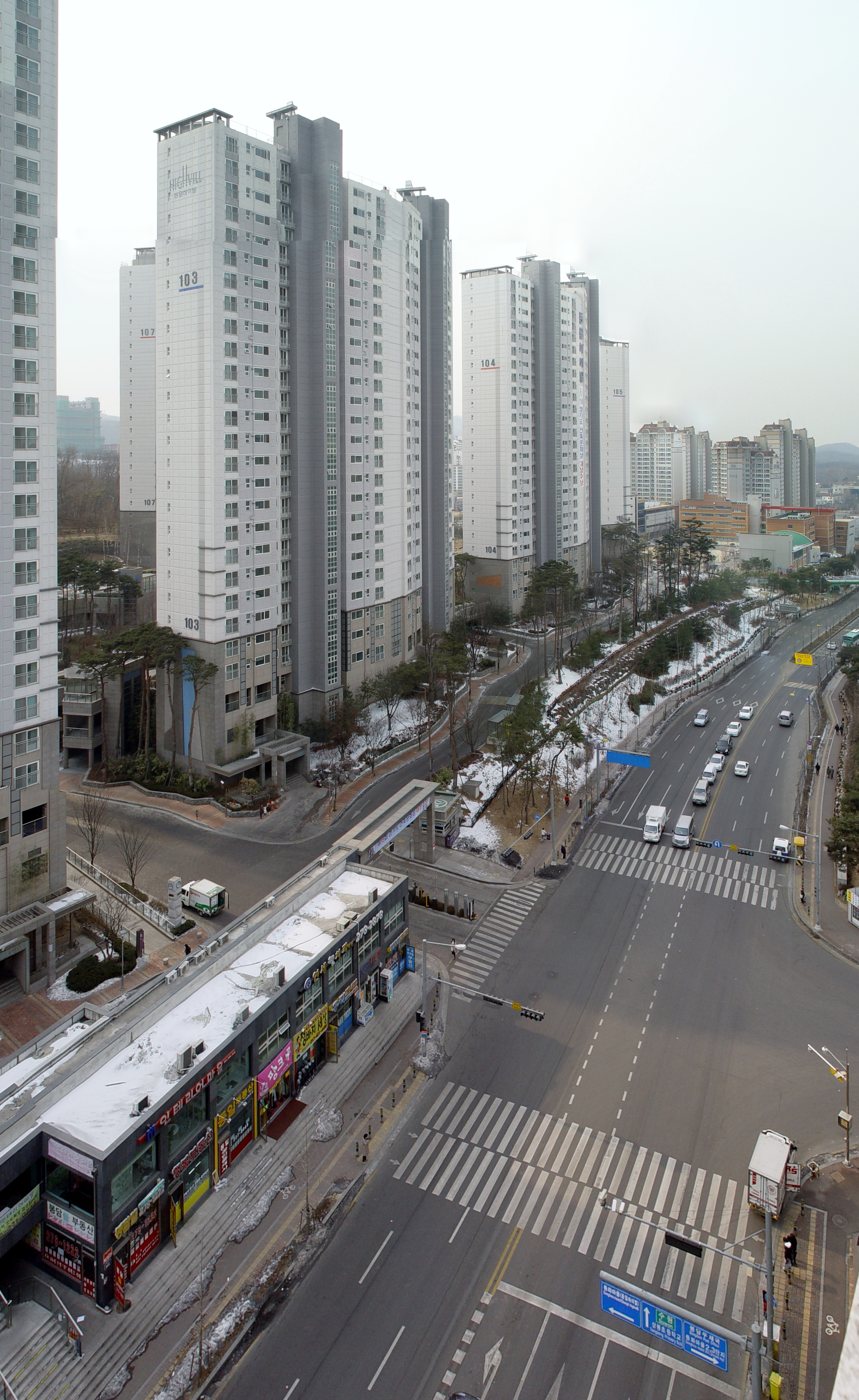
Road past Bongdam Centre

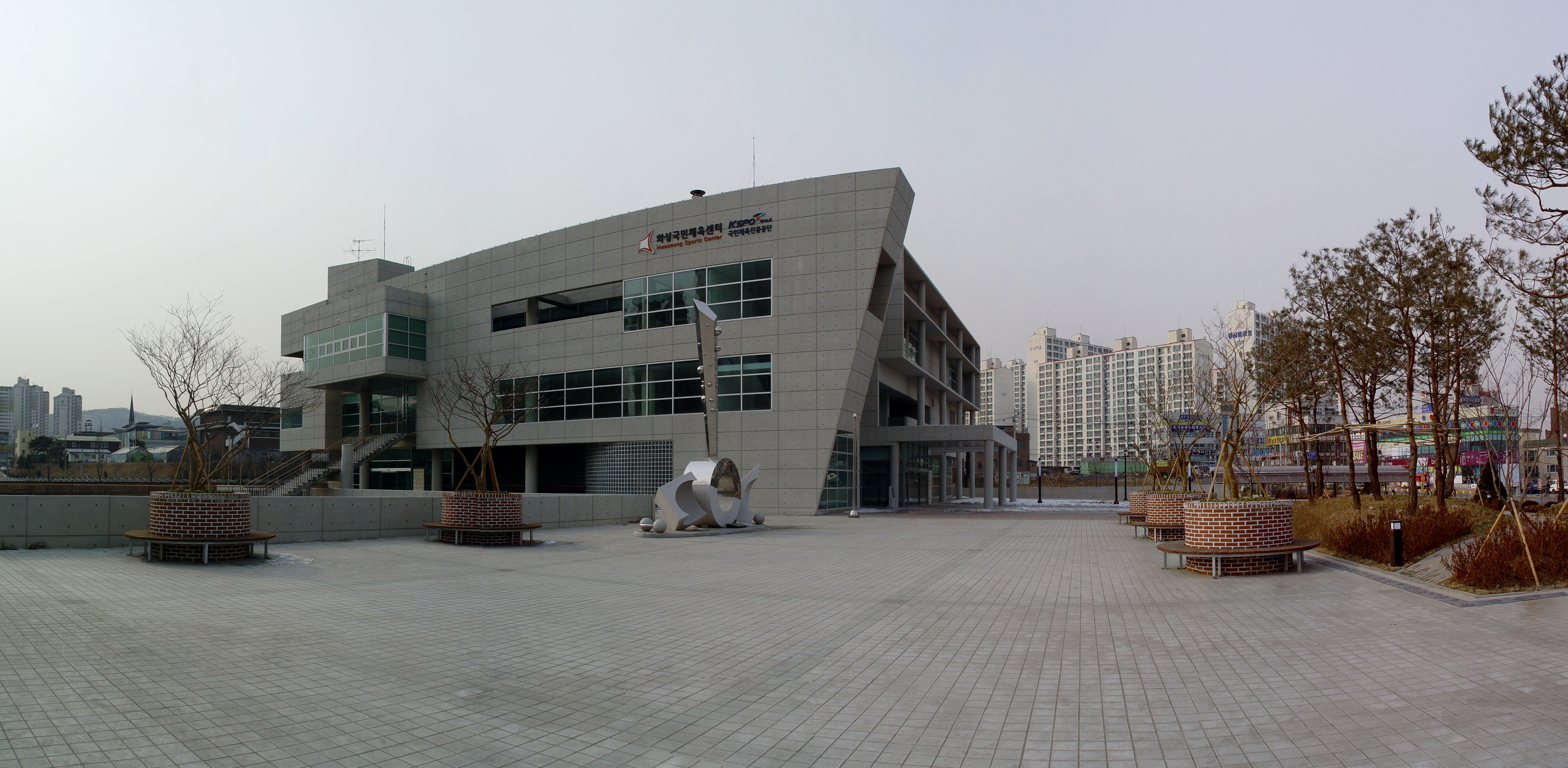
Hwaseong Sports Centre

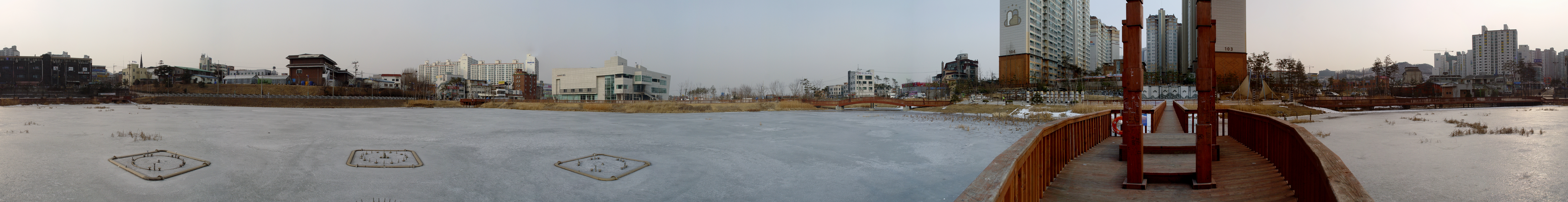
Lake by Bongdam Council Office

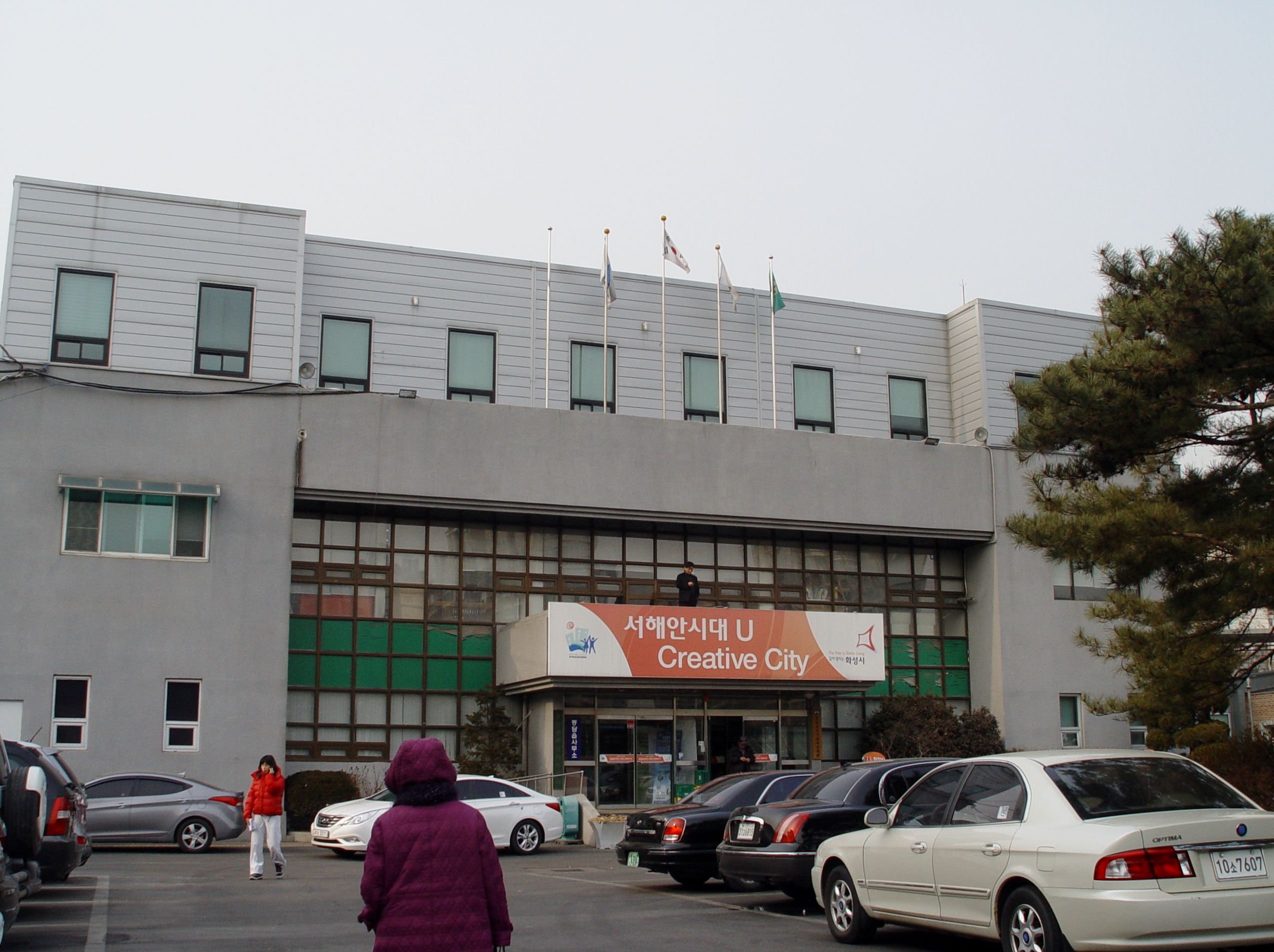
Bongdam Council Office

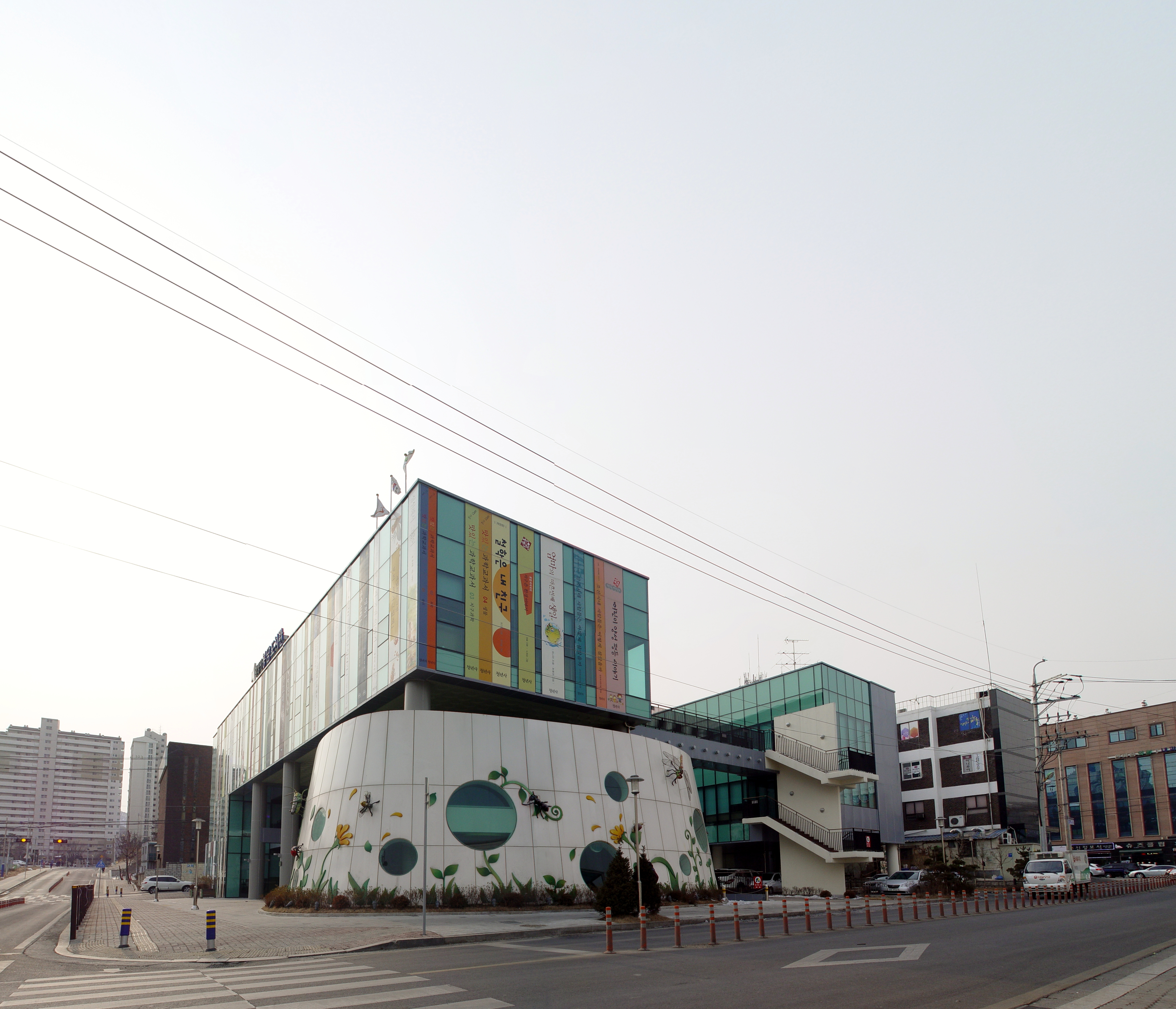
Bongdam Public Library

== surrounding living environment ==
It is scheduled to be built in Joam-ri, Namyang-eup, Hwaseong-si, Gyeonggi-do, and the apartment complex consists of a large complex that can accommodate a total of 2,329 households. Access to Songsan Mado IC and Pyeongtaek-Siheung Expressway makes it easy to move around Seoul and nearby Ansan in less than 10 minutes if you use National Road 77. Subsequently, the second outer ring road connecting Incheon to Dongducheon is scheduled to open, and once Shinansan Station and the West Coast double-track train are opened, it is possible to reach Yeouido, the financial center, within 30 minutes. After the completion of the 1st~5th pre-sale, the 6th Seohee Star Hills in Seulhang-ri, Hwaseong, and the 7th Seohee Star Hills in Namyang, Hwaseong will be additionally sold.
