= Jeam-ri massacre =

1919 massacre of Koreans by Japan

Jeam-ri Massacre
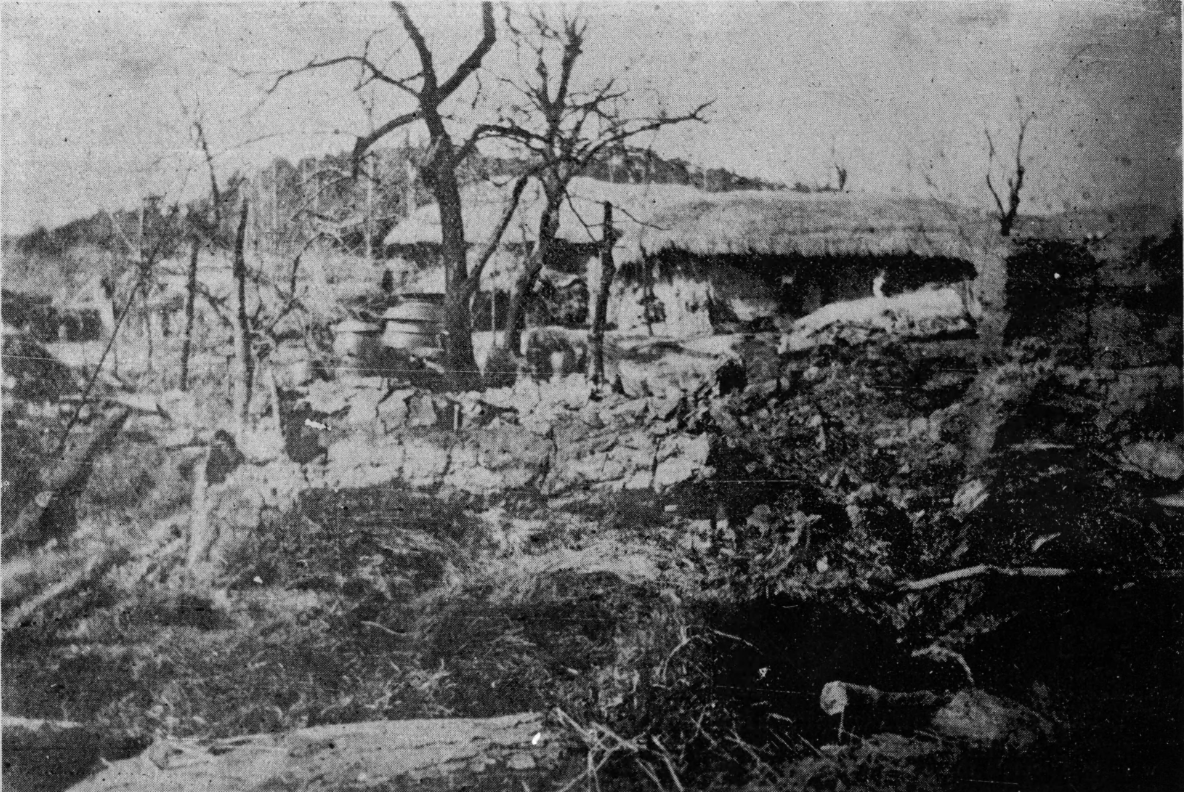
- Aftermath of the massacre in Jeam-ri, photographed by Schofield
- Location: 37°7′34″N 126°53′37″E; Jeam-ri, Suwon, Keiki-dō, Korea, Empire of Japan (now Manse District, Hwaseong, Gyeonggi Province, South Korea)
- Date: April 15, 1919
- Target: Cheondoist and Christian residents of Jeam-ri and Goju-ri
- Attack type: Massacre, arson
- Deaths: 28 or 29
- Perpetrator: Imperial Japanese Army
- Motive: Retaliation of March First Movement protests in the region
- Verdict: Lieutenant Arida Toshio found not guilty

- Jeam-ri massacre
- Hangul: 제암리 학살 사건
- Hanja: 提巖里虐殺事件
- RR: Jeam-ri haksal sageon
- MR: Cheam-ri haksal sakŏn

The Jeam-ri massacre (Korean: 제암리 학살 사건) was a mass murder of 28 or 29 unarmed Korean civilians and arson by the Imperial Japanese Army on April 15, 1919, in Jeam-ri (Note: Also spelled as Jeamni or Cheam-ri) and Goju-ri, Suwon, Japanese Korea as a retaliation of the March First Movement protests in the region. Although Japanese colonial authorities attempted to conceal the incident, it was exposed by foreign residents of Korea such as Canadian veterinarian Frank Schofield. In 1982, the site of the incident was designated as a Historic Site.

== Background ==
After the annexation of Korea in 1910, Japanese colonial rule sought to assimilate Koreans through cultural suppression, educational control, economic exploitation, and military policing that enabled widespread oppression and abuse. On March 1, 1919, the March First Movement demanding Korean independence started in Seoul and spread nationwide.

Demonstrations in Suwon were planned primarily by Christian and Cheondoist leaders, and people from various social groups such students, merchants, farmers, and laborers participated in them. On March 11, Cheondoists planned the first protest in Suwon. On March 21, Cheondoists and Christians held a demonstration in Osan-ri. On March 28 in Sagang-ri, 700 people gathered in front of the police station. When Hong Myeon, who led the demonstration, was seriously wounded by a Japanese police officer's gunfire, the enraged crowd killed the officer. On March 31, 1,000 people gathered at Baran-ri, which is near Jeam-ri. When three Koreans were wounded by gunfire from the Japanese military police, the enraged crowd killed a Japanese police chief and set fire to a Japanese elementary school, the post office, and the township office. On the night of April 1, bonfires were lit in 80 mountain peaks in the surrounding area and protesters shouted "Long Live Korean Independence" (대한 독립 만세; Daehan dongnip manse).

Japanese military arrest squads were dispatched as retaliation against the protests. From April 2 to 14 in Suwon, 803 people were arrested, 19 were injured, 10 died, and 276 houses were burnt down.

== Incident ==
Jeam-ri, also called Dureongbawi, was a clan-based agricultural village. At the time of the incident, 31 of its 33 households belonged to the Sunheung An clan. Most residents were farmers and followed Cheondoism, Methodism, or Confucianism.

On the afternoon of April 15, 1919, eleven Japanese soldiers and two police officers led by Lieutenant Arida Toshio arrived at Jeam-ri. They told twenty Christian and Cheondoist men that there will be a lecture at a church and made them assemble there. (Note: Dictionary of Korean History states that Japanese forces, claiming that they wished to apologize for the violence inflicted on residents during the March First Movement demonstrations, instructed all men aged 15 and older to gather at Jeam-ri Church.) Then, they locked all the doors and windows, massacred the people inside with guns and knives, and then set fire to the church in an attempt to destroy evidence. They shot or stabbed anyone trying to escape from the burning church. (Note: Our History Net states that Roh Gyeong-tae was the only person to escape from the church.) They also set fire to houses in Jeam-ri and killed two women: one was stabbed as she escaped her burning home, while the other was shot dead as she returned home after discovering that it had been set ablaze. Furthermore, Japanese soldiers proceeded to nearby Goju-ri, where they accused six members of the Kim Heung-ryeol family of being leaders of the demonstrations and executed them.

Encyclopedia of Korean Culture states that 28 people were killed and 31 houses were burnt down. Other sources state that 29 people were killed (19 inside the church, 4 outside the church, and 6 in Goju-ri), of whom 10 were Christians and 13 were Cheondoists.

== Aftermath ==
=== Cover-up ===
In 2007, The Asahi Shimbun reported the diary of Japanese commander Utsunomiya Taro, which revealed that the Japanese colonial authorities had attempted to cover-up the incident. Utsunomiya acknowledged that disclosing the facts would damage the reputation of the Japanese Empire by exposing Japanese forces’ involvement in brutal killings and arson. He recounted that, following discussions with colonial officials, they agreed to claim that the victims had been killed because they had resisted Japanese forces, while concealing the acts of arson and massacre.

=== Publicization ===
The massacre came to be recognized by missionaries as a prominent example of Japanese persecution of Christians, prompting numerous missionaries to visit Jeam-ri. Missionary H. H. Underwood and American consular officials arrived at Jeam-ri on April 16 and interviewed survivors. Canadian veterinarian Frank Schofield heard news of the event and immediately visited the scene on April 17. He then wrote a report titled "The Massacre of Chai-Amm-Ni" and published it in The Shanghai Gazette on May 27, 1919. British consul W. M. Royds also visited the site of the massacre to investigate the incident. English-language newspapers in Japan such as The Japan Advertiser and The Japan Chronicle began publishing detailed reports on the incident. Japan Christian Alliance sent a representative to investigate the incident and published accounts of the massacre in newspapers and magazines, urging the Japanese to reflect upon their actions.

=== Punishment ===
As news of the massacre spread, the Governor-General of Chōsen and the Japanese Army Command punished Lieutenant Arida with 30 days of confinement. When the incident appeared likely to develop into a diplomatic dispute, Arida was referred to a court-martial. However, on August 21, he was acquitted on the grounds that "he believed his actions were necessary to fulfill his mission" and thus "lacked criminal intent".

== Commemoration ==
Grave of the victims

In 1959, a memorial monument for the victims was erected. In 1968, Hong Won-sik, who led the Baran-ri protest and was killed in the massacre, and Schofield were awarded the Independence Medal of the Order of Merit for National Foundation. In 1982, as part of the Ministry of Culture and Information's project to preserve sites associated with national suffering, an excavation investigation was conducted in the area based on the testimony of Jeon Dong-rye, an eyewitness and the only surviving widow of the incident. The same year, Gyeonggi Province held a joint funeral ceremony to honor the victims, and the sites of houses, memorial monument, and grave were designated as Historic Site.

In 2001, the Jeam-ri March First Movement Martyrs’ Memorial Hall was completed. In 2024, it was relocated and renamed to Hwaseong Independence Movement Memorial. In 2026, Manse District of Hwaseong was named as such to commemorate the March First Movement protests in Jeam-ri.

== Apologies from Japanese Christians ==
In 1969, Oyama Imahito, president of the Japan Overseas Mission, expressed intention to donate 10 million yen as an act of atonement for the massacre. Although the Korean Methodist Church agreed to accept the donation, the victims’ families opposed, stating that accepting Japanese money would be an insult to their ancestors. In 1970, the money was donated and used to build a new church and a hall for the victims' families. In 1997, the Cultural Heritage Administration demolished the church and reconstructed it to restore its original appearance.

In 2019, to mark the 100th anniversary of the incident, a group of 17 Japanese Christians visited the site of the massacre and apologized on behalf of Japan. They criticized the fact that Japanese politicians had never apologized for the incident.

== In popular media ==
Ahn Dong-sun, the son of Ahn Jong-hu who was killed in the massacre, produced the film Dureongbawi in 1972. It was posthumously released by his son Ahn Sang-ho in 2009.

The Gyeam-ri incident from the 2026 South Korean TV series 100 Days of Deception is inspired from this incident.

== See also ==
- March First Movement

== External link ==
- Hwaseong Independence Movement Memorial
