= Byeongjeom District =

District of Hwaseong, South Korea

Coordinates: 37°12′50″N 127°01′40″E

- Non-autonomous District
- Interactive map of Byeongjeom District
- Country: South Korea
- Region: Sudogwon
- Province: Gyeonggi
- City: Hwaseong

Area
  - Total: 24.3 km^{2} (9.4 sq mi)

Population (2025)
  - Total: 172,945
- Website: hscity.go.kr/byeongjeom/index.do

Korean name
- Hangul: 병점구
- Hanja: 餠店區
- RR: Byeongjeom-gu
- MR: Pyŏngjŏm-gu

Byeongjeom District (Korean: 병점구) is a district of the city of Hwaseong in Gyeonggi Province, South Korea.

== Administrative divisions ==
Dongtan District is divided into the following "dong"s.

- Banwol-dong
- Byeongjeom-1 dong
- Byeongjeom-2 dong
- Jinan-dong
- Hwasan-dong
