= Hyupsung University =

Coordinates: 37.213°N 126.953°E

- 협성대학교
- Type: Private
- Established: 1977
- Academic staff: 169
- Students: 5200
- Location: Hwaseong
- Website: http://www.uhs.ac.kr/

- Hyupsung University
- Hangul: 협성대학교
- Hanja: 協成大學校
- RR: Hyeopseong daehakgyo
- MR: Hyŏpsŏng taehakkyo

Hyupsung University (Korean: 협성대학교) is a Christian private university in Hwaseong, South Korea.

The predecessor of Hyupsung University is Seoul Seminary, which opened in April 1977. In 1983, it was reorganized as Hyupsung Theological College in 1991 and then changed its name to Hyupsung Theological University in February 1993.

As of 2015, the faculties of the Collaborative College are theological colleges, the College of Humanities and Social Sciences, the College of Business Administration, the College of Science and Technology, the College of Arts and the College of Liberal Arts.
