= Manse District =

District of Hwaseong, South Korea

Coordinates: 37°09′25″N 126°45′25″E

- Non-autonomous District
- Interactive map of Manse District
- Country: South Korea
- Region: Sudogwon
- Province: Gyeonggi
- City: Hwaseong

Area
  - Total: 465.58 km^{2} (179.76 sq mi)

Population (2025)
  - Total: 235,486
- Website: hscity.go.kr/manse/index.do

Korean name
- Hangul: 만세구
- Hanja: 萬歲區
- RR: Manse-gu
- MR: Manse-gu

Manse District (Korean: 만세구) is a district of the city of Hwaseong in Gyeonggi Province, South Korea. The district was named so to memorialise the Jeamni massacre, during the March 1st Movement of 1919, that occurred in what is now Manse.

== Administrative divisions ==
Dongtan District is divided into the following "dong", "eup"s and "myeon"s.

- Ujeong-eup
- Namyang-eup
- Hyangnam-eup
- Mado-myeon
- Seoshin-myeon
- Songsan-myeon
- Yangam-myeon
- Jangan-myeon
- Paltan-myeon
- Sesol-dong
