= Hyohaeng District =

District of Hwaseong, South Korea

Coordinates: 37°12′35″N 126°55′53″E

- Non-autonomous District
- Interactive map of Hyohaeng District
- Country: South Korea
- Region: Sudogwon
- Province: Gyeonggi
- City: Hwaseong

Area
  - Total: 153.48 km^{2} (59.26 sq mi)

Population (2025)
  - Total: 159,021
- Website: hscity.go.kr/hyohaeng/index.do

Korean name
- Hangul: 효행구
- Hanja: 孝行區
- RR: Hyohaeng-gu
- MR: Hyohaeng-gu

Hyohaeng District (Korean: 효행구) is a district of the city of Hwaseong in Gyeonggi Province, South Korea.

== Administrative divisions ==
Hyohaeng District is divided into the following "dong", "eup" and "myeon"s.

- Bongdam-eup
- Maesong-myeon
- Bibong-myeon
- Jeongnam-myeon
- Gibae-dong
