= U-JIN Tech Corp. =

South Korean company

Coordinates: 37.219143°N 126.856567°E

U-JIN Tech Corp
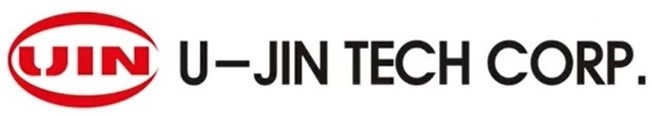
- Industry: Friction welding, automation
- Founded: 2009
- Headquarters: 825-39, Hyundaikia-ro, Bibong-myeon, Hwaseong-si, Gyeonggi-do, Republic of Korea
- Key people: Kim, Seong-Yoon (CEO)
- Products: Friction welding machines, automated manufacturing cells
- Number of employees: 50

Korean name
- Hangul: 유진테크
- RR: Yujin tekeu
- MR: Yujin t'ek'ŭ
- Website: www.ujinfw.com

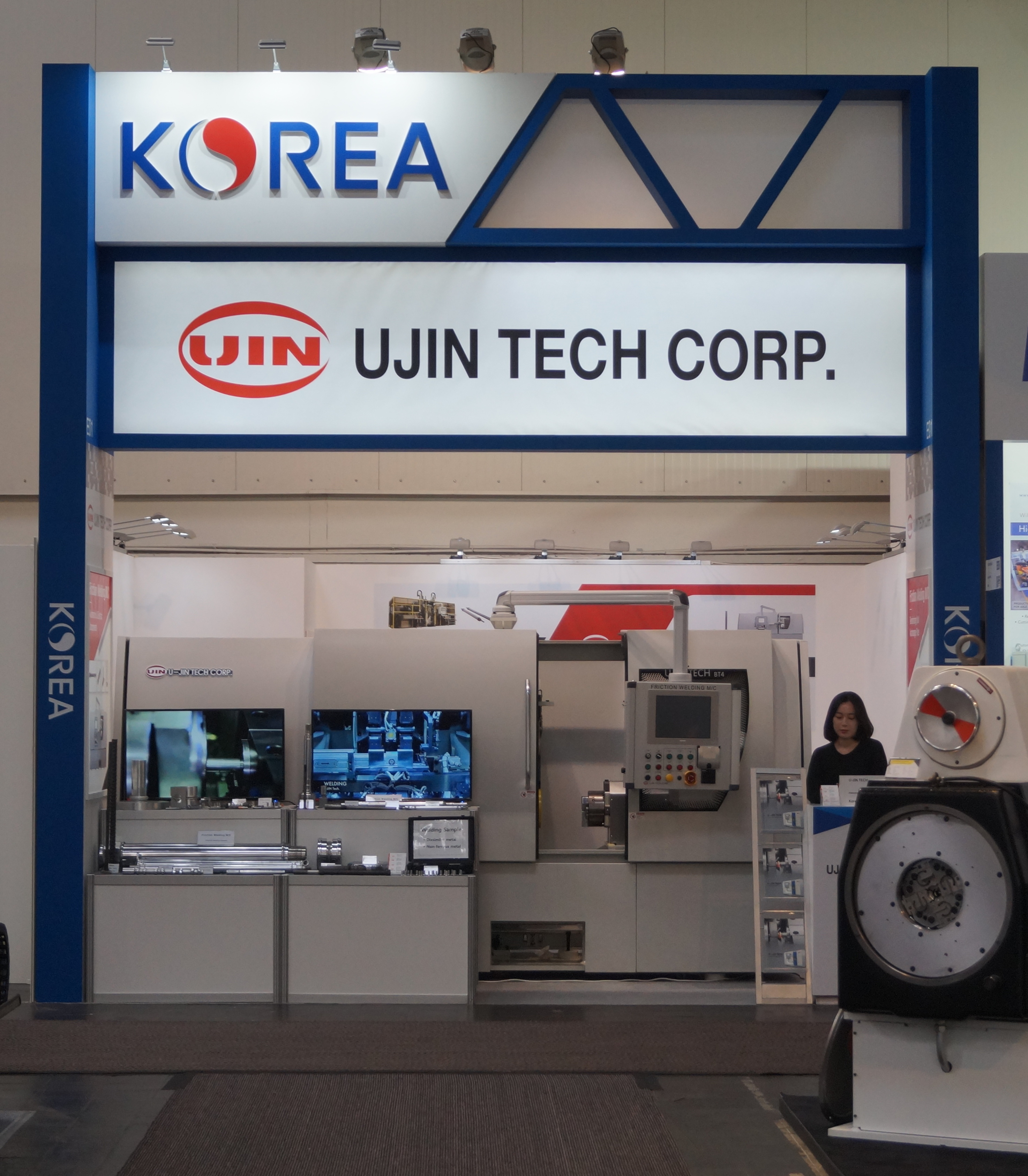
U-JIN Tech Corp. at the EMO fair in Hannover, 2019

U-JIN Tech Corp. is a South Korean manufacturer of friction welding machines and automated manufacturing cells.

== History ==
U-JIN Tech Corp. was founded in February 2009. It stablished its own R&D center within the Korea Industrial Technology Association (KOITA) in 2010. The R&D center has the objective to develop new products.

U-Jin has initially developed and manufactured hydraulic friction welding machines, and it built Korea's first CNC friction welding machine in 2012.

In 2015 the company was recognized as Contributor for Development of Excellent Capital Goods by the Minister of Trade, Industry, and Energy. In November 2016 it received the European CE Certificate and started exporting machines to Europe. On Trade Day in December 2016, it received the 10 Million Dollar Export Tower Award.

== Friction welding machines ==
CNC technology is used by U-JIN Tech Corp both for automatic material transport and in cases where high accuracy is required. Due to the position measuring devices known from CNC milling machines, the length tolerance of the components can be maintained more accurately than with conventional hydraulic machines. It is even possible, to bring the spindle to a standstill in a given position so that the two eyes of a drive shaft can be positioned at an angle to each other.

The two spindles of U-JIN's computer numerical controlled double-head friction welding machines are driven by servo motors that allow the angular position of their motor shaft to be controlled, as well as the speed of rotation and acceleration, since they are equipped with position sensors. If the spindles are controlled in the same way as CNC-controlled servo motors, angular accuracies of ±0.5° can be achieved, e.g. at both ends of a cardan shaft.

== Friction welded products ==
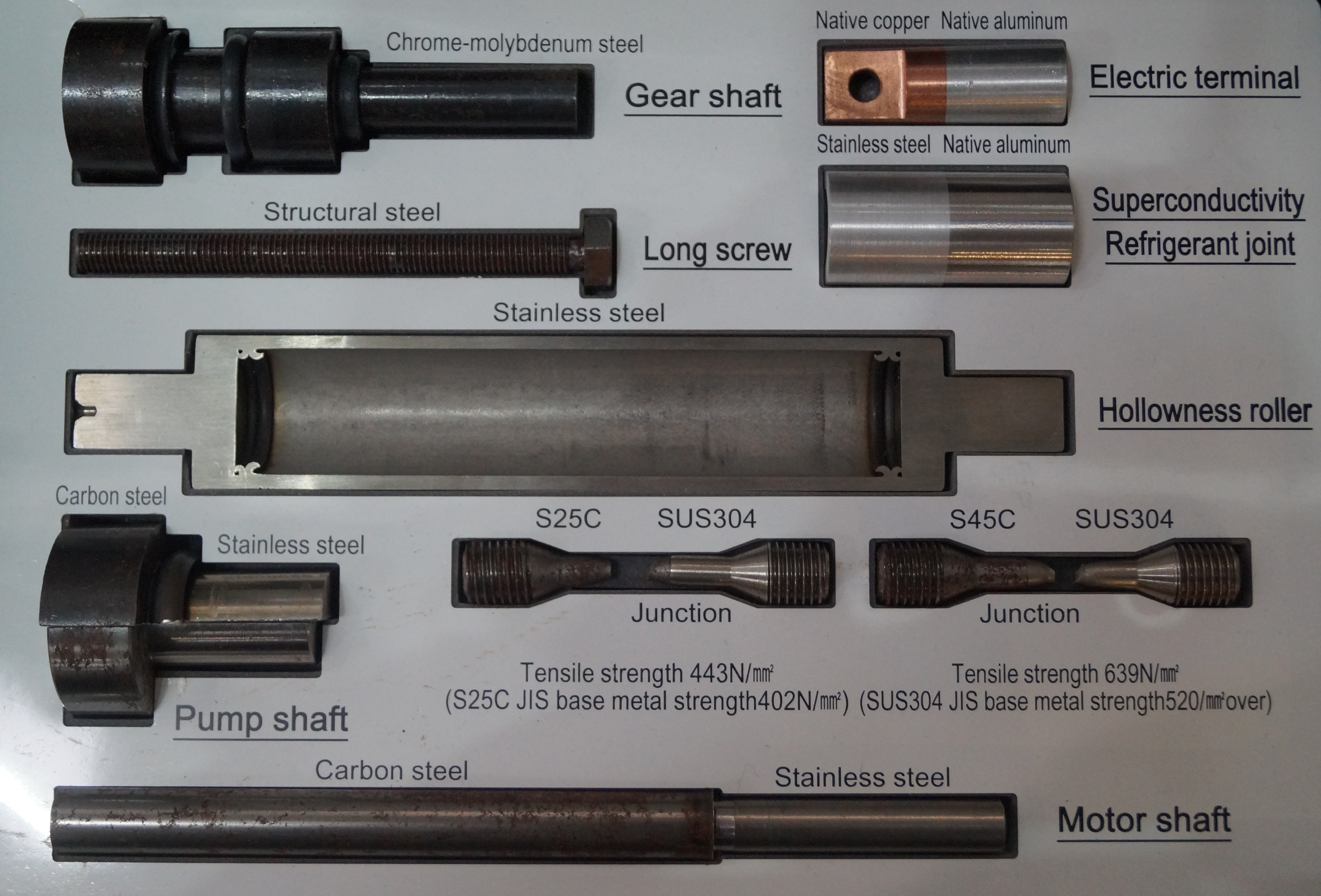
Products of U-JIN Tech Corp displayed at the EMO fair 2019

As friction welding operates below the melting point of the materials, even dissimilar material joints can be produced with high tensile strength. In many cases, the tensile strength of the bimetallic joint is higher than that of the softer base material.

U-JIN's friction welding machines are used industrially for a wide variety of products:

- Gear shafts made of chrome-molybdenum steel
- Electric terminals and cable lugs made of pure copper and pure aluminum
- Long screws and bolts made of structural or high-speed steel
- Stainless steel and aluminum adapters for refrigerants or coolants in superconductors
- Shaft-hub connections in hollow shafts for the drive train of cars
- Carbon steel (Advanced High Strength Steel, AHSS) and stainless steel pump shafts
- Transition pieces in carbon steel S25C and stainless steel SUS304 (tensile strength 443 N/mm²)
- Transition pieces made of carbon steel S45C and stainless steel SUS304 (tensile strength 639 N/mm²)
- Motor shafts made of structural and stainless steel
