= Hwaseong, Gyeonggi =

City in South Korea

Hwaseong
- Specific city
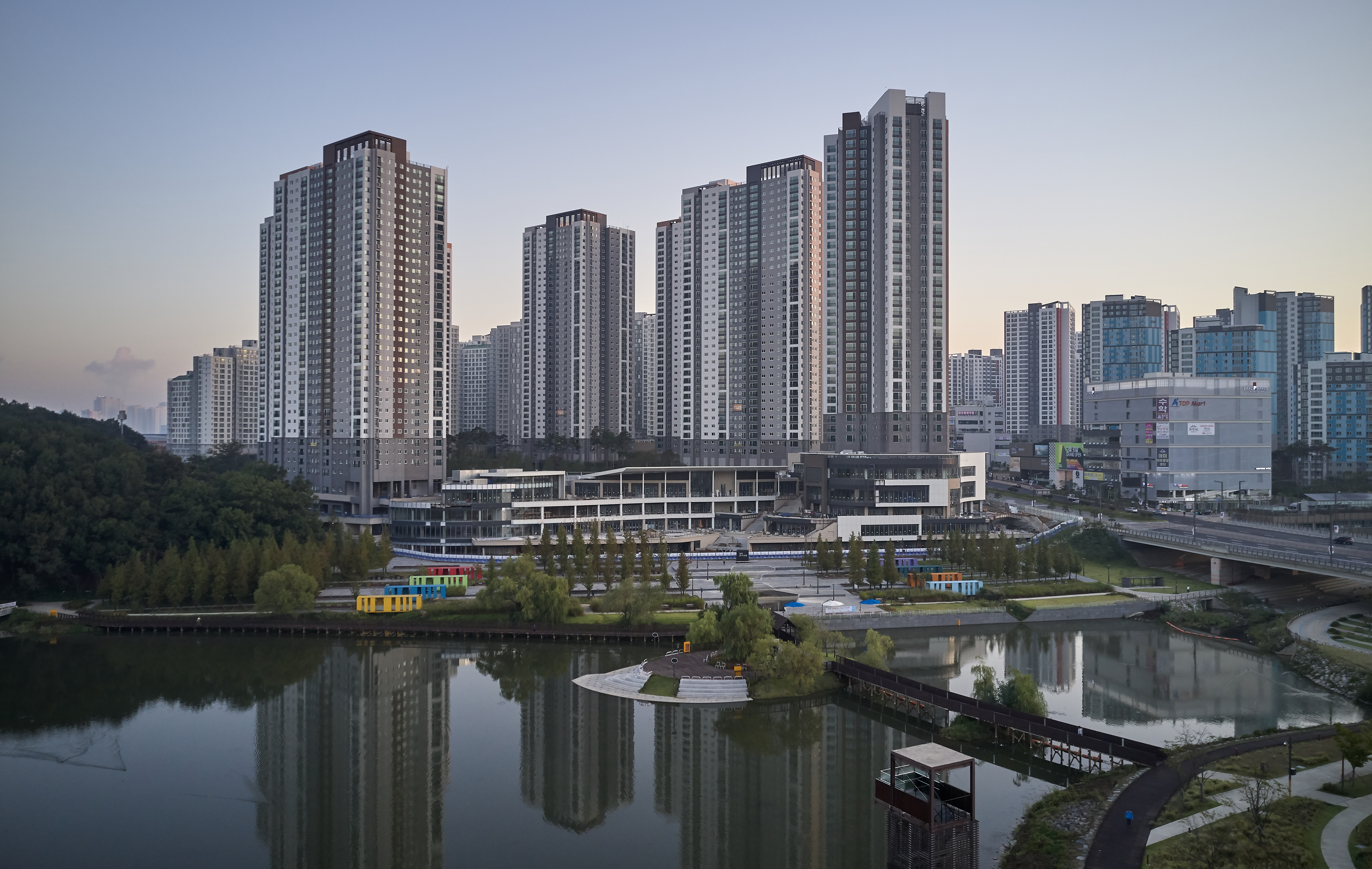
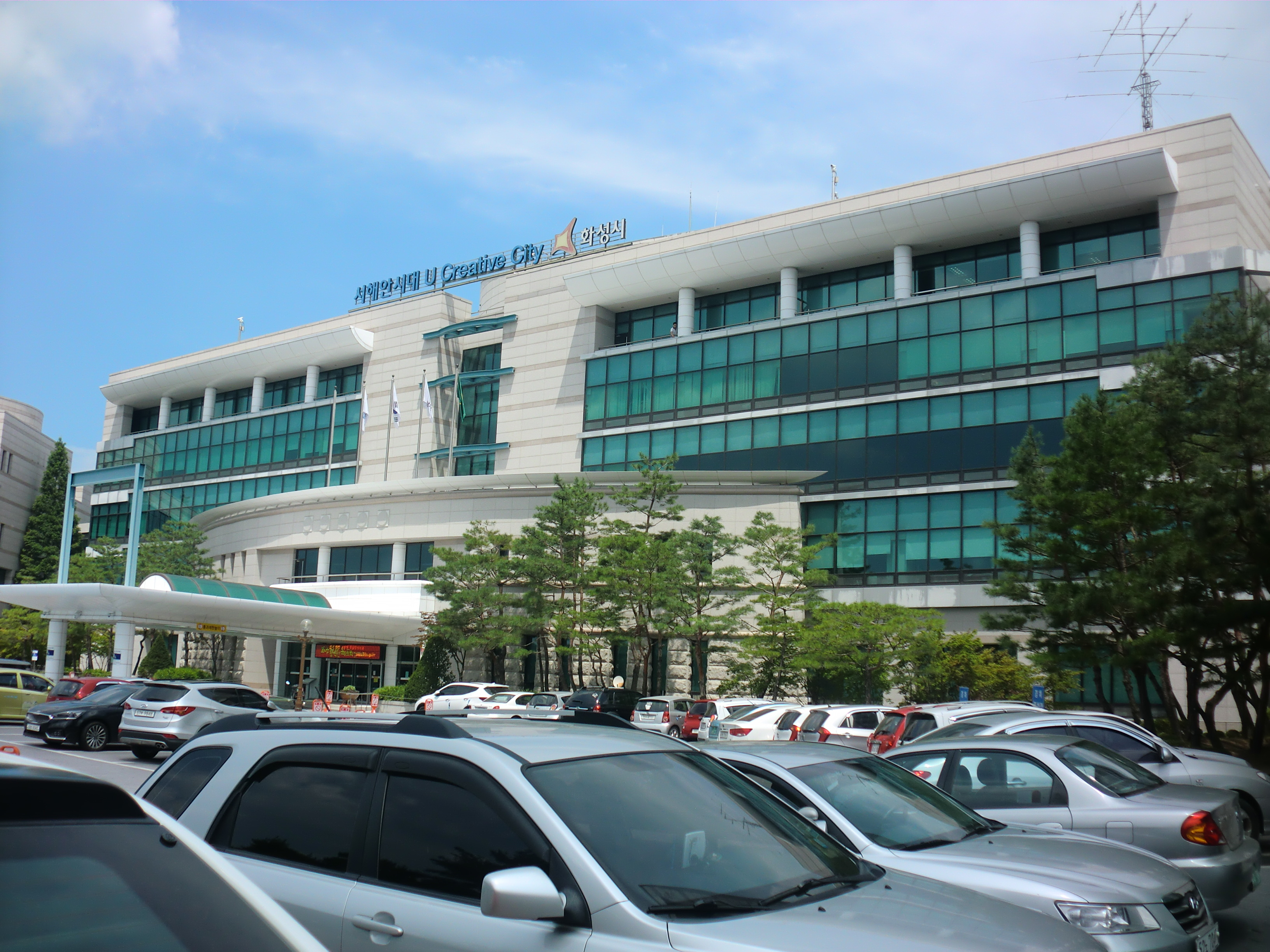
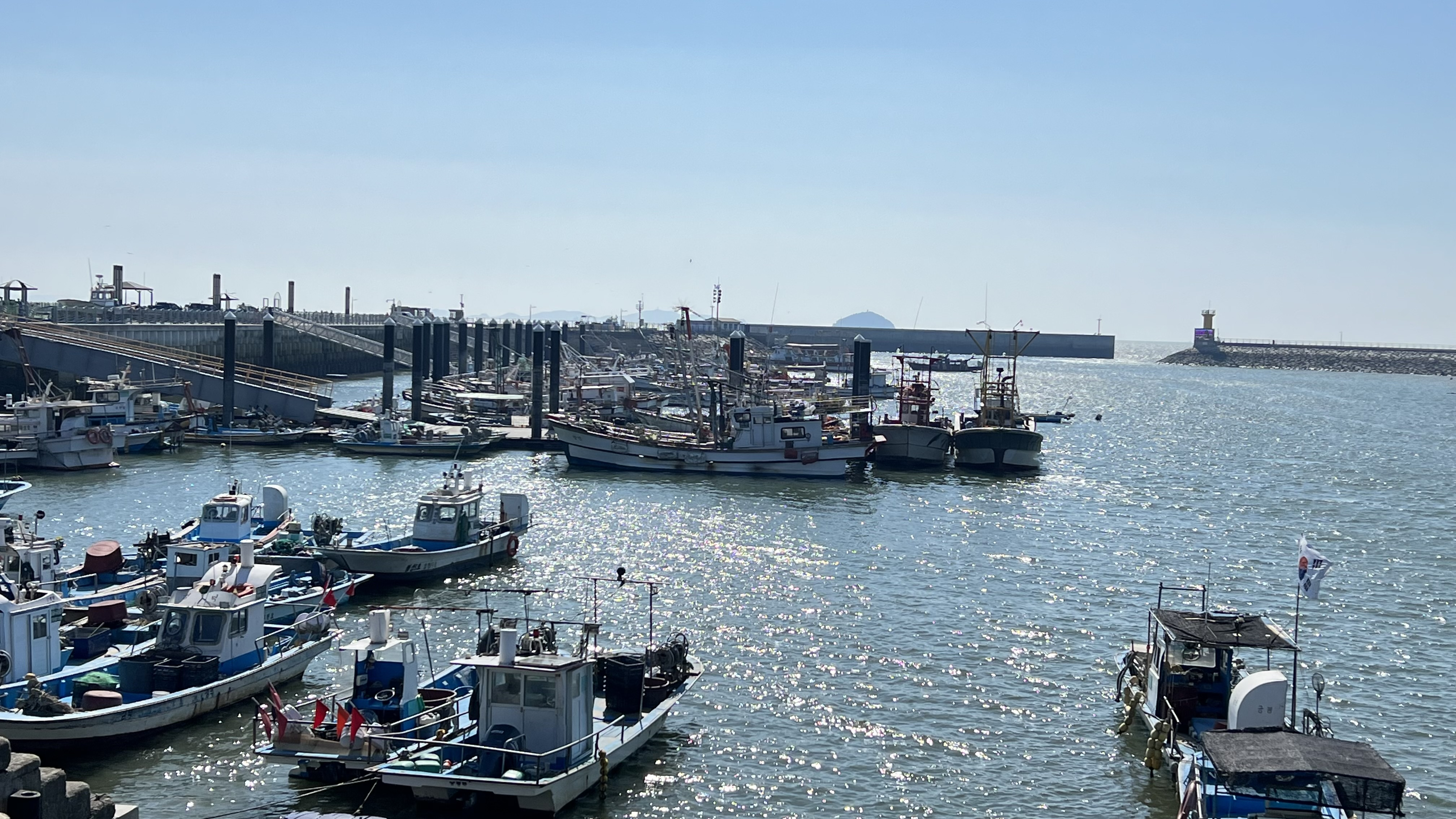
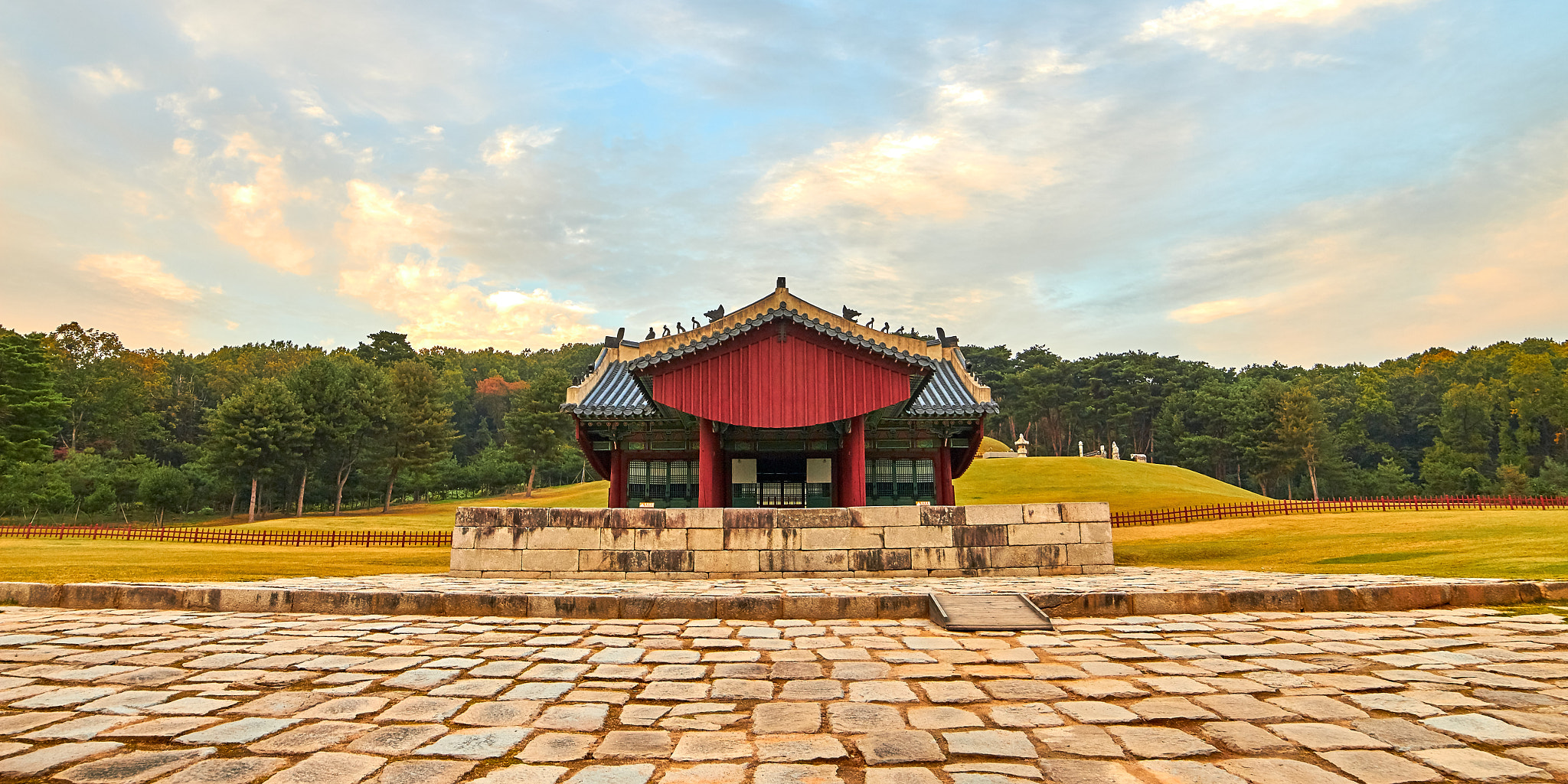
- Lake Como Complex Hwaseong City Hall Gungpyeong Port Family Feud Grave Site at Yunggeolleung

- Flag Emblem of Hwaseong

- Location within South Korea
- Coordinates: 37°10′50″N 126°49′35″E
- Country: South Korea
- Province: Gyeonggi
- Administrative divisions: 4 eup, 9 myeon, 13 dong

Government
  - Mayor: Jeong Myeong-geun

Area
  - Total: 689.48 km^{2} (266.21 sq mi)

Population (October 2022)
  - Total: 904,267
  - Density: 929.53/km^{2} (2,407.5/sq mi)
  - Dialect: Seoul

Korean name
- Hangul: 화성시
- Hanja: 華城市
- RR: Hwaseong-si
- MR: Hwasŏng-si

Hwaseong (Korean: 화성; Korean pronunciation: [ɸa.sʰʌŋ]) is a city in Gyeonggi Province, South Korea. It is located on the coast of the Yellow Sea. It has the largest area of farmland of any city or county in Gyeonggi Province. Seoul Subway Line 1 passes through Hwaseong, stopping at Byeongjeom Station. Suin-Bundang Line also passes through the city, stopping at Eocheon Station.

Hwaseong Fortress is located in nearby Suwon.

== History ==
During the time of the early Three Kingdoms of Korea, parts of modern-day Hwaseong was controlled by the state of Wonyang (원양국; 爰襄國), a small statelet that was part of the Mahan confederacy. In 1949, when Suwon was split from the rest of Suwon County, the remaining area of Suwon County was renamed to Hwaseong County, after Hwaseong Fortress in Suwon. On January 1, 1989, the town of Osan was promoted to a city, splitting from Hwaseong County. On March 21, 2001, Hwaseong County would also be promoted to the status of city.

=== Universal Studios ===
On November 27, 2007 the city was chosen as the site for the future Universal Studios South Korea theme park. Originally set to open in 2016, it would have been the world's largest Universal Studios theme park, being larger than all the other four combined. The US$3.1 billion park was expected to create at least 58,000 new jobs. In 2014, the project was put on hold. The plan was restarted in 2015, and K-Water (Korean Water Resources Corporation) was chosen as a business partner. Universal Studios South Korea is no longer under development as of 2020.

=== Aricell battery factory fire ===
On June 24, 2024, a fire at a lithium battery factory owned by Aricell killed 23 workers, and a further 8 workers were wounded. The fire was caused by the explosion of a series of battery cells.

== Climate ==
Hwaseong has a humid continental climate (Köppen: Dwa), but can be considered a borderline humid subtropical climate (Köppen: Cwa) using the −3 °C (27 °F) isotherm. The city is located in the western area of the Korean Peninsula. The temperatures in winter are low along the coast since it is located in the lower plains and close to the Yellow Sea (West Sea), where the water is shallow. Additionally, Siberian air flows directly into the western flatlands of the Korean peninsula, making several areas colder.

Climate data for Hwaseong (1995–2020 normals)
Month	Jan	Feb	Mar	Apr	May	Jun	Jul	Aug	Sep	Oct	Nov	Dec	Year
Mean daily maximum °C (°F)	2.4 (36.3)	5.1 (41.2)	10.8 (51.4)	17.4 (63.3)	23.1 (73.6)	27.0 (80.6)	28.9 (84.0)	30.1 (86.2)	26.3 (79.3)	20.3 (68.5)	12.3 (54.1)	4.5 (40.1)	17.4 (63.3)
Daily mean °C (°F)	−2.0 (28.4)	0.3 (32.5)	5.3 (41.5)	11.5 (52.7)	17.0 (62.6)	21.6 (70.9)	24.8 (76.6)	25.8 (78.4)	21.4 (70.5)	14.7 (58.5)	7.4 (45.3)	0.1 (32.2)	12.3 (54.1)
Mean daily minimum °C (°F)	−6.3 (20.7)	−4.1 (24.6)	0.5 (32.9)	6.4 (43.5)	12.0 (53.6)	17.3 (63.1)	21.7 (71.1)	22.5 (72.5)	17.3 (63.1)	10.0 (50.0)	2.9 (37.2)	−4.2 (24.4)	8.0 (46.4)
Average precipitation mm (inches)	13.5 (0.53)	22.2 (0.87)	32.5 (1.28)	63.3 (2.49)	72.2 (2.84)	102.0 (4.02)	327.3 (12.89)	232.9 (9.17)	128.2 (5.05)	46.0 (1.81)	43.9 (1.73)	18.2 (0.72)	1,102.2 (43.39)
Average precipitation days (≥ 0.1 mm)	3.7	3.6	5.1	6.7	6.3	6.9	12.9	11.4	7.3	4.8	7.3	5.1	81.1
Source: Korea Meteorological Administration

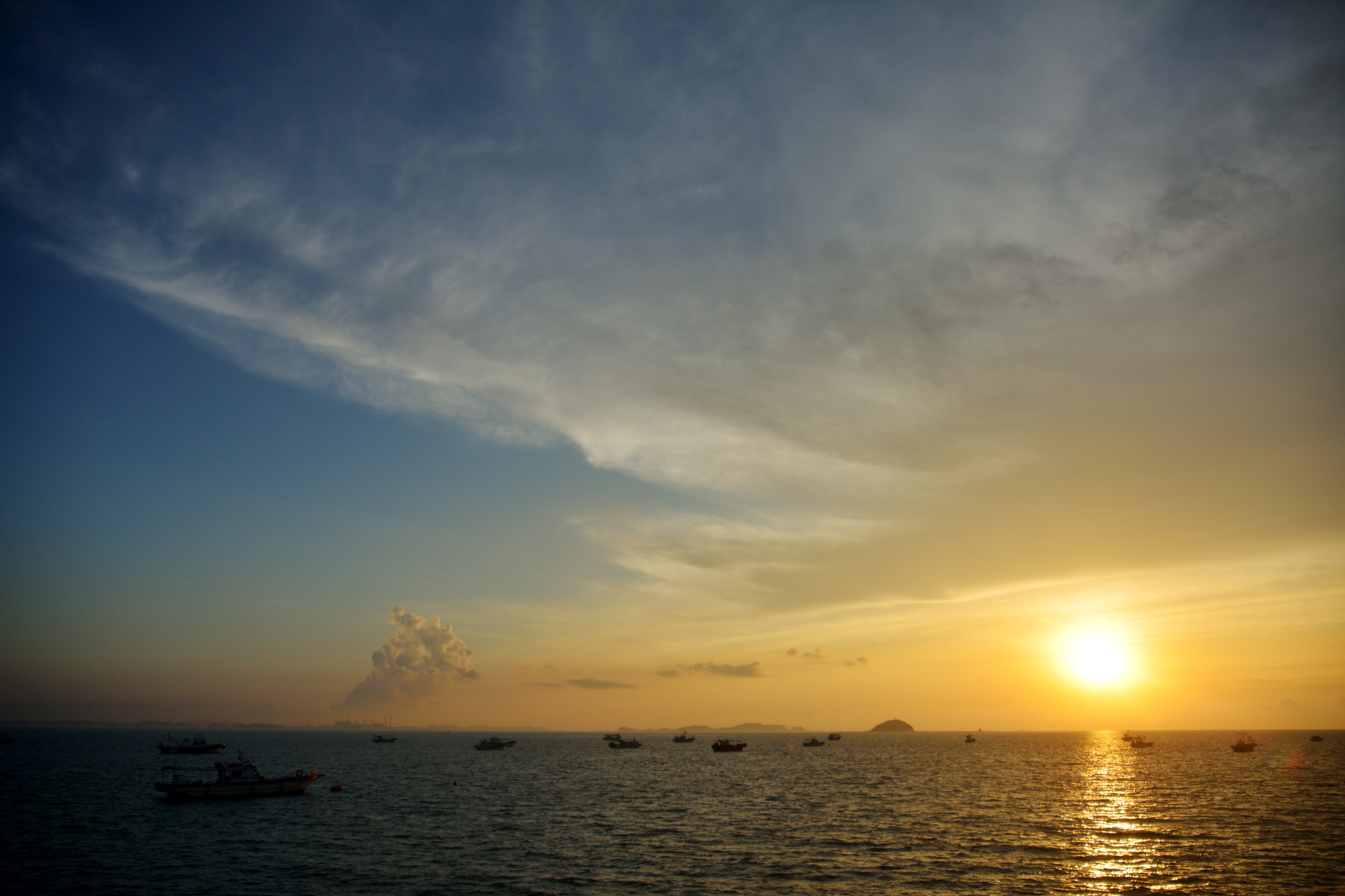
Gungpyeong Port

== Demographics ==
Hwaseong is populated by 49% male South Korean citizens, 46% female South Korean citizens, and 5% foreign residents. With 236,241 homes, there are on average 2.8 people per registered place of residence in the city. With the exceptions of Byeongjeom 2-dong, Dongtan 2-dong and Dongtan 3-dong, there is a larger number of males than females in every division of the city.

=== Administrative divisions ===
Hwaseong has 4 administrative wards:

- Byeongjeom District
- Dongtan District
- Hyohaeng District
- Manse District

4 districts has 4 towns (eup), 9 townships (myeon) and 16 neighborhoods (dong). Each eup and myeon is further divided into villages (ri). In October 2014, Namyang-dong was downgraded to an eup- the first case in South Korea. Hwaseong's name comes from Suwon's Hwaseong Fortress, built by King Jeongjo. The most populous areas of Hwaseong are Namyang (to the west), Hyangnam and Bongdam (central), and Dongtan to the east. Dongtan has had an SRT high speed rail station since December 2017. The Seohae Expressway runs through western Hwaseong, while the Gyeongbu Expressway runs through the east of the city.

== Local products ==
Many special products are sold in the Hwaseong area that are different from other regions of Gyeonggi Province. There are many facilities that grow products ranging from honey melons to herbs. Additionally, meat and dairy products are also available. Hangwa is also made by local companies as a specialty.

== Sports ==
Hwaseong is home to the V-League women's volleyball team Hwaseong IBK Altos and the K League 2 football team Hwaseong FC, both of which are based at Hwaseong Sports Town. This sports complex hosted football and basketball matches at the 2014 Asian Games, while the shooting events were held elsewhere in Hwaseong.

== Notable companies ==
- U-JIN Tech Corp., friction welding machines

== Notable people ==
- Hui-bin Hong, Joseon concubine
- Cha Bum-kun, South Korean football player
- Chaeun Lee, South Korean snowboarder
- Cho Yong-pil, South Korean singer
- Hong Shin-seon, South Korean poet
- Lee Yong-jin, South Korean comedian
- Seo Soo-jin, South Korean singer
- Yoon Jeong-han, South Korean singer

== See also ==
- List of cities in South Korea
- Geography of South Korea
- Bongdam
- Joam
- Hwaseong serial murders
