= Dongtan District =

District of Hwaseong, South Korea

- Non-autonomous District
- Interactive map of Dongtan District
- Country: South Korea
- Region: Sudogwon
- Province: Gyeonggi
- City: Hwaseong

Area
  - Total: 56.32 km^{2} (21.75 sq mi)

Population (2025)
  - Total: 422,553
- Website: hscity.go.kr/dongtan/index.do

Korean name
- Hangul: 동탄구
- Hanja: 東灘區
- RR: Dongtan-gu
- MR: Tongt'an-gu

Dongtan District (Korean: 동탄구) is a district of the city of Hwaseong in Gyeonggi Province, South Korea.

== Administrative divisions ==
Dongtan District is divided into the following "dong"s.

- Dongtan 1-dong
- Dongtan 2-dong
- Dongtan 3-dong
- Dongtan 4-dong
- Dongtan 5-dong
- Dongtan 6-dong
- Dongtan 7-dong
- Dongtan 8-dong
- Dongtan 9-dong
