= Hong Shin-seon =

South Korean poet

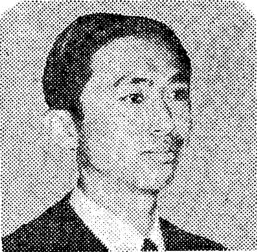
- Hong Shin-seon in 1976
- Born: February 14, 1944 (age 82)
- Writing career
- Language: Korean
- Genre: Poetry

Hong Shin-seon (Korean: 홍신선; born 1944) is a Korean poet. His writing career dates back to the 1960s, when he was active as a modernist poet. During the 1970–80s, his poetry engaged critically with the politics of the time. From the 1990s, Hong's focus shifted to Buddhist thought, and the serial poem Maeumgyung (마음경 The Book of the Mind), which was written over a period over twenty years, is considered his major work.

== Biography ==
Hong was born in 1944 in Hwaseong, Gyunggi Province. From a young age he studied Chinese literary classics under the guidance of his great-uncle, and grew up reading classical texts such as Samgukji (삼국지 Records of the Three Kingdoms). As a middle-school student, he read Kim Naesung's popular detective story Main (마인 Fiend) and began to dream of becoming a novelist. Throughout his years at high school he read the literary journals Jayumunhak and Hakwon and wrote his own stories. Hong has spoken about how this period improved and influenced his writing by building up his vocabulary and training him in descriptive technique.

Once at university, Hong's interest shifted from prose fiction to poetry. After three years of writing and honing his craft, he officially debuted as a poet while in his senior year when his poem "The Greek's Pipe" was selected for publication in the journal Shinmunhak in 1965. The poem was influenced by the Greek myths he had been reading throughout college. In 1968, Hong set up the literary coterie magazine Hanguksi with Oh Kyuwon and others. In 1970 he married one of his fellow coterie members, the poet Ro Hyang-Rim. In the 1980s he left Seoul and settled in Andong, North Gyeongsang Province. There his world expanded from the narrower confines of literary circles, and he came into closer contact with the diverse lives around him. This brought about a big shift in his poetry. In 2003 he founded the literary magazine Munhak Seon (or Zen, 선禪), and remains its publisher and editor.

== Writing ==
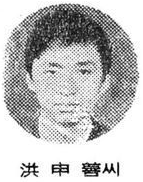
Hong in 1974

=== People-oriented poetry ===
Although he himself had engaged in numerous debates and discussions about literature and politics with fellow coterie members and writers since his debut in 1965, Hong Shin-seon recalls how after moving to Andong in the 1980s and coming into daily contact with ordinary lives, he came to realize the speciousness of the very reality or ideologies that he and his friends had so often talked about. Hong felt that the people he encountered in Andong were "a key-hole, a password, and a symbol" in that they would allow him to "observe contemporary life". Uri iut saramdeul (우리 이웃 사람들 Our Neighbors, 1984), an earlier collection from this period, features people from broad walks of life, from tearoom servers and people in migrant communities to brokers. Searching for the right form and way to depict the lives of people in an honest, truthful manner, Hong eventually came to turn to a sort of narrative poetry, or storied poetry. This collection marks Hong's transition from brooding critical and intellectual poet to a poet interested in the lives of his neighbors.

This is still very much apparent in his next collection, Dasi gohyangeseo (다시 고향에서 Home Again, 1990), even if the backdrop is now the poet's own hometown of Hwaseong rather than Andong. The poems collected here are especially notable for their embodiment of giving voice and form to agricultural/farming communities that have been hollowed out by industrialization and the loss of traditional forms of life and teeter on the brink of ruin. Hong's attention to marginalized or excluded 'neighbors' continue in Salmui ongi (삶의 옹이 Gnarl of Life, 2014).

=== Maeumgyung Series ===
Hong Shin-seon published the first installment of his serial poem "Maeungyung" in 1991 and the last installment, collected in Uyeoneul jeom jjikda (우연을 점 찍다 Marking Out Coincidence), in 2009. This series of poems ponder life and death from the perspective of Buddhist thought. Hong says the impulse for this work came from the strong aversion he felt toward the general prevalence of poetry purporting to represent reality, as well as from the considerable shock he experienced at the demise of the socialist countries of the Eastern bloc, which prompted him to seek out work that was more reflective and that interrogated one's inner life. As for his growing interest in Buddhism, he points to Kim Daljin's poetry and the Buddhist seon poems translated by Kim as a direct influence on him. Hong's serial poem captures his own dawning realization that life can be viewed much more clearly when one confronts rather than turns away from the solitude and futility of existence.

== Works ==
=== Complete works ===
Hong Shin-seon Siseonjip (홍신선 시전집 The Complete Works of Hong Shin-seon), Sanmaek, 2004.

Hong Shin-seon Siseonjip 2. Pyeheowa jeonyul (홍신선 시전집 2. 폐허와 전율: 홍신선 시읽기 The Complete Works of Hong Shin-seon Vol.2 Ruin and Frisson: Reading Hong Shin-seon's Poetry), Kookhak, 2008.

=== Poetry collections ===
Gyeoulseom (겨울섬 Winter Island), Pyungminsa, 1979.

Salm geodeup sarado (삶 거듭 살아도 Though Life May Recur), Munhakyesulsa, 1982.

Uri iut saramdeul (우리 이웃 사람들 Our Neighbors), Moonji, 1984.

Dasi gohyangeseo (다시 고향에서 Home Again), Munhak Academy, 1990.

Hwangsa baram sogeseo (황사 바람 속에서 In the Yellow-Dust Winds), Moonji, 1996.

Seobyukdagjip (서벽당집), Munhakdongne, 2001.

Jahwasangeul wihayeo (자화상을 위하여 Toward a Self-Portrait), Segyesa, 2002.

Uyeoneul jeom jjikda (우연을 점 찍다 Marking Out Coincidence), Moonji, 2009.

Maeumgyung (마음경 The Book of the Mind), Munhak Seon, 2012.

Salmui ongi (삶의 옹이 Gnarl of Life), Munhak Seon, 2014.

Sarami saramege (사람이 사람에게 From one Person to Another), Paran, 2015.

Jikbakguriui bomnorae (직박구리의 봄노래 Spring Song of a Bulbul Bird), Paran, 2018.

=== Academic works and essay collections ===
Uri munhakui nonjengsa (우리 문학의 논쟁사 The History of Disputes in Our Literature), Eomungak, 1985.

Sangsangryukgwa hyunsil (상상력과 현실 Imagination and Reality), Inmundang, 1990.

Pumaneuro naradeuneun seneun japji anneunda (품안으로 날아드는 새는 잡지 않는다 We Do Not Capture the Bird that Flies into Our Arms), Cheonghan, 1990.

Hanguk geundaemunhak ironui yeongu (한국근대문학이론의 연구 A Study of Korean Modern Literary Theory), Munhak Academy, 1991.

Hanguksiui nonri (한국시의 논리 The Logic of Korean Poetry), Donghaksa, 1994.

Sarangiran ireumui neutinamu (사랑이란 이름의 느티나무 A Zelkova Tree Called Love), Wawu, 2002.

Hanguksiwa bulgyojeok sangsangryuk (한국시와 불교적 상상력 Korean Poetry and the Buddhist Imagination), Youkrack Books, 2004.

Marui gyurl salmui gyurl (말의 결 삶의 결 The Texture of Words, The Texture of Life), Sanmaek, 2005.

Jangwangseolgwa hubaknamu gajok (장광설과 후박나무 가족 Lengthy Tales and the Silver Magnolia Family), Cheonyunui sijak, 2014.

=== Coterie Magazine ===
Ibyeoreun dwobyeol (이별은 두별 Goodbyes are Two Byes), Munhak Academy, 1989.

=== Co-authored or edited works ===
Silgwa baneului akjang (실과 바늘의 악장 Conductor of Thread and Needle), co-author, Hakwon, 1979.

Najeun moksoriro (낮은 목소리로 In a Low Voice), ed., Eomungak, 1985.

Uriga muri doeeo (우리가 물이 되어 We as Water), ed., Eomungak, 1985.

Siyeo younghonui noraeyeo (시여 영혼의 노래여 Poetry, Song of the Soul), co-author, Hyewon, 1986.

Haengbokui moraeseong (행복의 모래성 The Sandcastle of Happiness), co-author, Jun, 1989.

Si changjak irongwa silje (시창작 이론과 실제 Writing Poetry: Theory and Practice), co-author, Siwa sihaksa, 1998.

Hanguk hyeondaemunhaksa (한국현대문학사 A History of Korean Contemporary Literature), co-author, Simunhaksa, 2000.

Jisik giban sahweowa bulgyo saengtaehak (식기반사회와 불교생태학 Knowledge-Based Society and Buddhist Ecology Studies), co-author, Acanet, 2006.

Yukju Hong Gisamgwa na (육주 홍기삼과 나 Yukju Hong Gisam and I, Co-author, Saenggagui namu, 2010.

Youngwonhan gohyang eomeoni (영원한 고향 어머니 Mother, the Eternal Home), co-author, Minyesa, 1987.

=== Translated works (anthology) ===
유한나, 《한국 현대시》, 고요아침, 2005 / Hong Shin-seon et al., trans. and ed. Hanna Ryu, Koreanische moderne Gedichte, Goyoachim, 2005.

== Awards ==
1983 Nokwon Literature Prize

1997 Hyeondae Munhak Prize (for "Hae, neutjeonyuk hae"

2002 The Society of Korean Poets Prize

2003 Peasant Literature Award (for Jahwasangeul wihayeo)

2006 Contemporary Buddhist Literature Award (for Maeumgyung)

2006 Cheon Sang-byeong Poetry Prize (for "Bakwoon" and four other poems)

2010 Kim Daljin Literature Prize (for Uyeoneul jeom jjikda)

2014 Kim Satgat Literature Award (for Salmui ongi)

2017 Nojak Munhak Award (for "Hapdeokjang gireseo" and four other poems)

2018 Moon Deoksoo Literature Prize (for Jikbakguriui bomnorae)
