= Bundang =

Urban area in Seongnam, South Korea

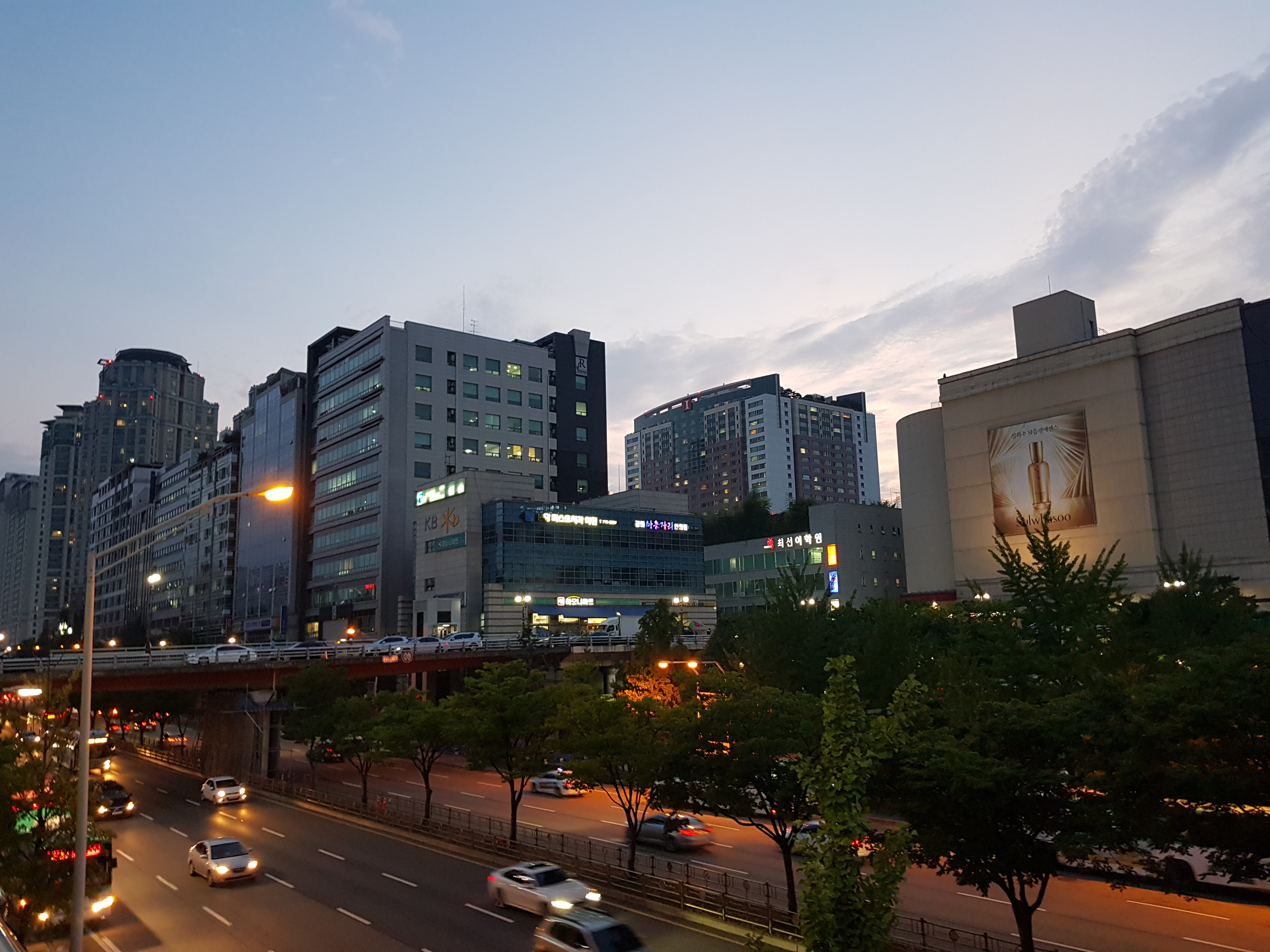
- Commercial area in Sunae-dong
- Country: South Korea
- Region: Gyeonggi Province

Government
  - mayor: Jeon Dong-eok (전동억)

Area
  - Total: 69.4 km^{2} (26.8 sq mi)
- Time zone: UTC+9 (Korea Standard Time)
- Area code: +82-31

Korean name
- Hangul: 분당신도시
- Hanja: 盆唐新都市
- RR: Bundang sindosi
- MR: Pundang sindosi

Bundang (Korean: 분당) is a planned community in Bundang District, Seongnam, Gyeonggi Province, South Korea. It was developed to encourage affordable housing and urban decentralization. The community has a sports complex, a park and a youth center.

== Origin ==
Bundang was developed during the late 1980s to address rising housing prices, and excessive population density in Seoul, and to support the middle class.

== Tancheon ==
Tancheon is a stream which flows through central Seongnam in Gyeonggi Province. A tributary of the Han River, it flows into the Han near Seoul. Tancheon is a fast-moving stream with an area of 302 square kilometres (117 sq mi) and a length of 35.6 kilometres (22.1 mi). The Tancheon Project Night Workshop is a collection of city projects to increase the Tancheon's popularity by sponsoring local arts. During the late 1990s, development in Yongin abruptly degraded the Tancheon's water quality with sewage and construction soil. Seongnam and Yongin implemented river-restoration projects, and the Tancheon's surrounding landscape and water quality are slowly improving.

== Transport ==
Two subway lines—the Bundang Line and Shinbundang Line—connect Bundang with the rest of the Seoul Capital Area. The Bundang line, first opened in 1994, connected Ori Station with Suseo Station, and numerous expansions have been made since, with the line now spanning from Wangsimni Station to Suwon Station. Phase 1 of the Shinbundang Line was completed in October 2011, connecting Jeongja Station with Gangnam District, and Phase 2 opened in January 2016, expanding the line southward. From Migeum Station, it takes 19 minutes to reach Gangnam station, and 17 minutes to reach Gwanggyo station. Compared to bus travel, the subway reduces travel time by up to 25 minutes to Gangnam and up to 30 minutes to Gwanggyo. The increase in accessibility to Seoul has caused the prices of apartments in Bundang to increase. There are also a number of bus routes which service the communities in Bundang. The Yongin–Seoul, Gyeongbu and Bundang-Suseo Urban Expressways connect Bundang with Seoul and nearby city centers.

== Landmarks ==
=== Tancheon Sports Complex ===
Tancheon Sports Complex, in Bundang's Yatap-dong neighborhood, was known as the Seongnam 2nd Complex during construction and renamed in January 2006. It consists of a multipurpose stadium which includes a main stadium, a soccer pitch and a baseball diamond; a multipurpose gym, a swimming pool, an ice rink and a tennis court. A Bundang Line subway station and the Seongnam Central Library are nearby. Seongnam FC, runner-up in the 2012 Peace Cup plays its K League 1 home games here. The club is owned and operated by the Seongnam Urban Development Corporation.

=== Bundang Central Park ===
Bundang Central Park, which opened on July 31, 1994, is in the Sujeon neighborhood and covers 42,982 square metres (10.62 acres) at the foot of the 88-metre-high (289 ft) Yongjangsan. Native species have been planted in the original terrain and forest. The park is a popular location for film and television and print advertising, and is a popular destination for tourists from Japan and Taiwan. Four pedestrian bridges, wheelchair-accessible with Braille blocks, connect an apartment complex surrounding the park. A breastfeeding room is available, and strollers may be rented.

Athletic facilities include badminton and gateball fields. The park has lawn, evergreen and hawthorn open spaces. The round, 12,500-square-metre (3.1-acre) Bundang Pond and its fountain are next to the Central Square rollerblading area. Cultural events and performances are presented at outdoor theaters. Free summer concerts were presented from 2013 to 2019. The park has a clock tower, parking and toilets, and is 500 metres (550 yd) from Seohyeon station.

=== Bundang Jeongja Youth Center ===
The Bundang Jeongja Youth Training Center opened in 2004, and joined the Youth Foundation in 2010. In 2012, it won the National Youth Training Center's Presidential Award and the eighth Blue Growth Grand Prix. The center unites youth, local people, families and schools.

Family-centered programs focus on strengthening community familial bonds. A reading program fosters knowledge and increases creativity. Other programs stimulate self-reliance and growth, and community programs create spaces where local teenagers can communicate.

== Police station ==
Bundang has a police department due to its population growth, number of businesses and standard of living. It conducts criminal investigations, crime prevention Including patrolling), and traffic control to protect lives and property.

On January 27, 1995, the Seongnam South police department was divided and installed in the Yatap neighborhood. At that time, it had 223 police officers. Four police boxes have been added since then, and the police station incorporated the auditor's office in 1999. In 2003, with the implementation of the local police system, three police patrols and one police box were installed. In May 2006, construction of the Jeongja-dong complex began; the building was completed on July 3, 2008. In April 2009, the Pankyo police station was newly established.

In July 2007, a blood pressure monitor was set up in the Traffic Civil Service Office for employees. The Citizen Discomfort and Abuse Reporting Center encourages community cooperation. Women's counselors are always available, and monthly meetings are held to encourage morale. Children's safety guard houses, which protect children threatened by strangers and animals or in an emergency, are in each district. The children's department provides field trips which include boarding traffic-patrol cars, abduction prevention and traffic safety education, and information about police equipment.
