= Sanghyeon station =

Metro station in Yongin, South Korea

Coordinates: 37.2970°N 127.0691°E

D17 상현 Sanghyeon
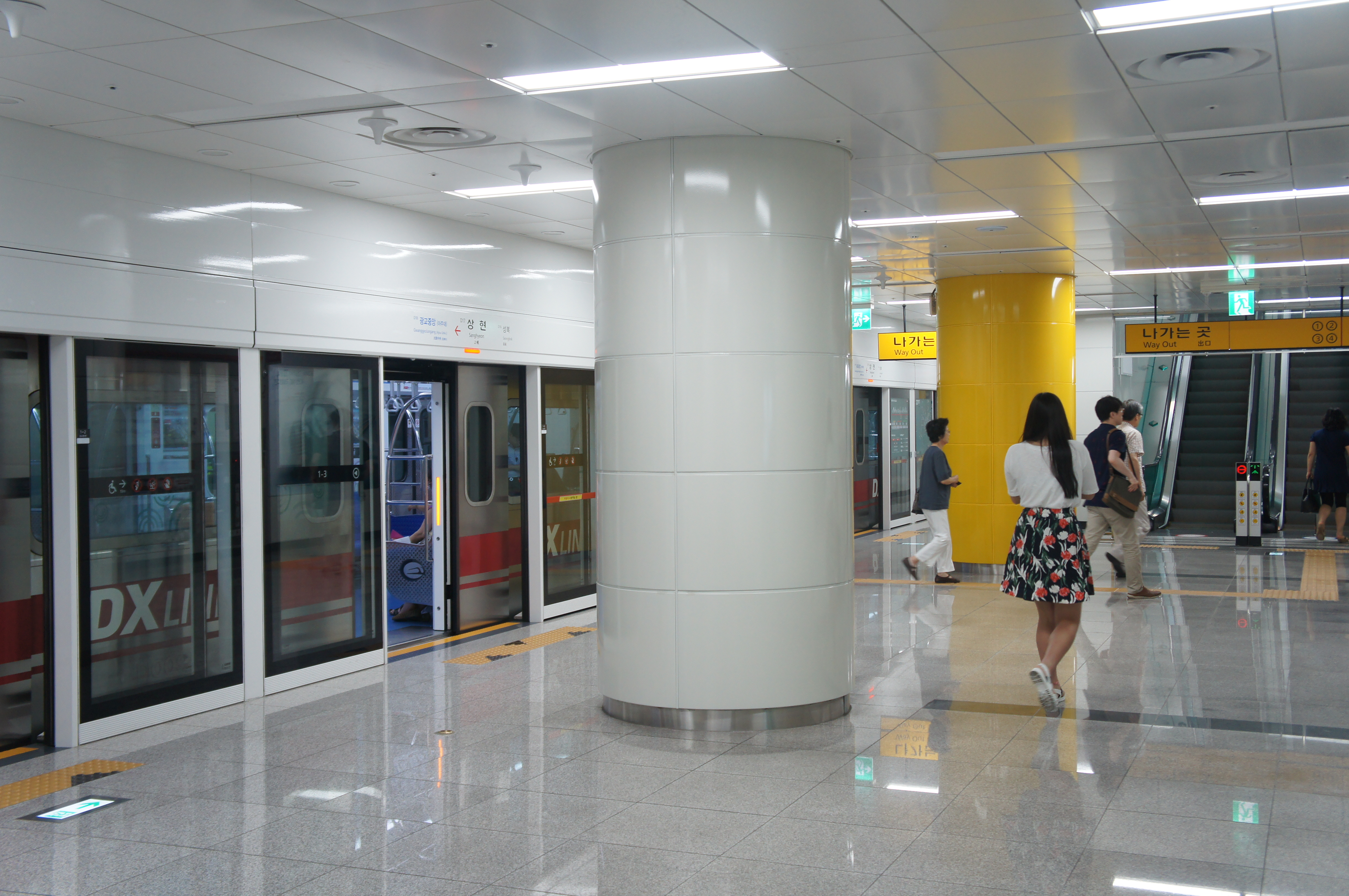

Korean name
- Hangul: 상현역
- Hanja: 上峴驛
- Revised Romanization: Sanghyeon yeok
- McCune–Reischauer: Sanghyŏn yŏk

General information
- Location: Sanghyeon-dong, Suji-gu, Yongin, Gyeonggi-do
- Operator: Gyeonggi Railroad Co., Ltd.
- Line: Shinbundang Line
- Platforms: 2
- Tracks: 2

Construction
- Structure type: Underground

Key dates
- January 30, 2016: Shinbundang Line opened
Location

Sanghyeon Station is a metro station located in Sanghyeon-dong, Suji-gu, Yongin, Gyeonggi-do, South Korea. The station's floors are decorated with LCD screens displaying water ripples and fish that interact with people's footsteps, symbolic of the popular Gwanggyo lake park that is located 10 minutes by foot from this station.

Many shops, restaurants, clinics, banks and commercial buildings surround this station, which is part of the Gwanggyo new city.

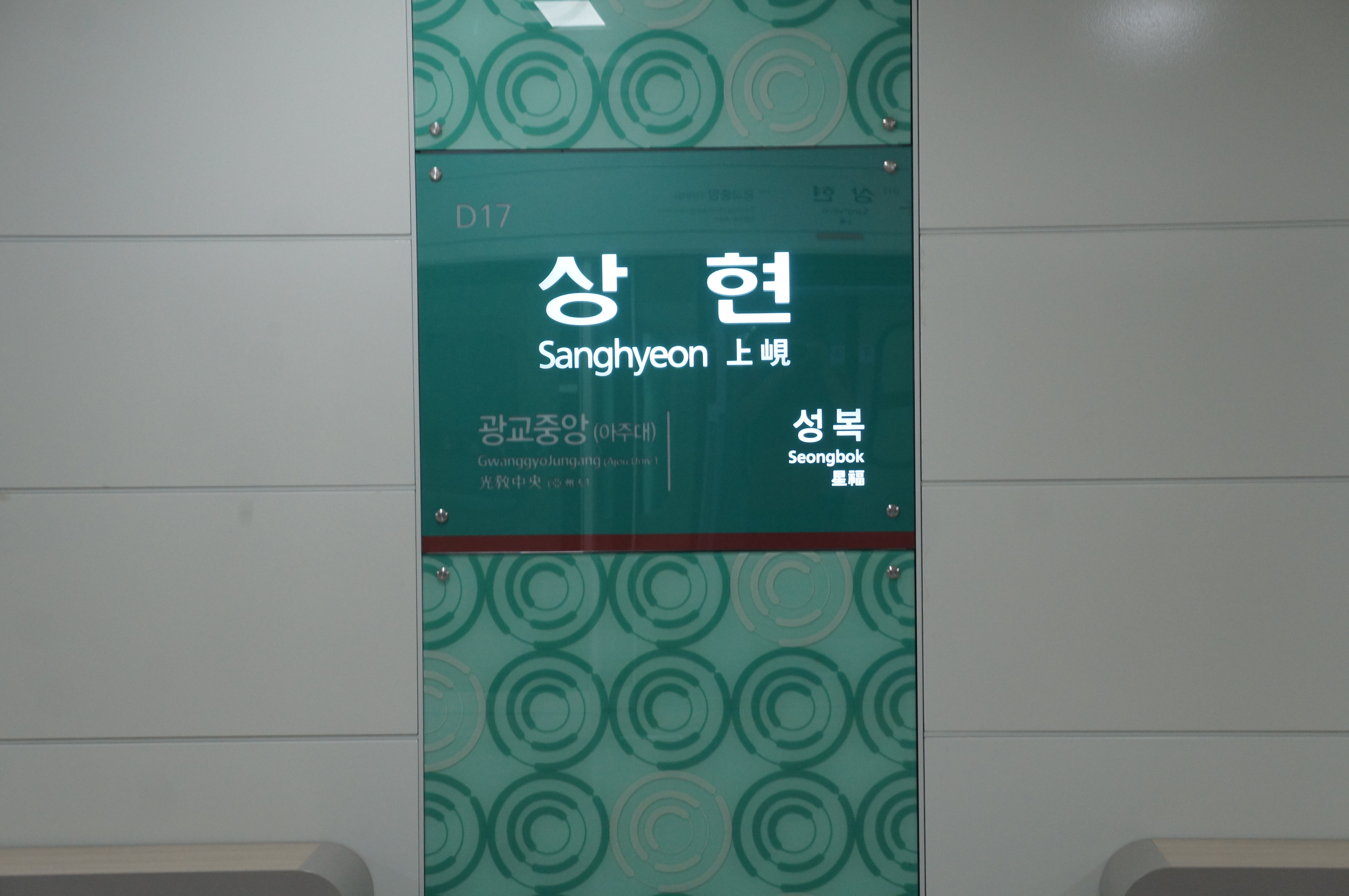
Station nameplate

Preceding station	Seoul Metropolitan Subway	Following station
Seongbok towards Sinsa	Shinbundang Line	GwanggyoJungang towards Gwanggyo
