= GwanggyoJungang station =

Metro station in Yongin, South Korea

Coordinates: 37.2885°N 127.0516°E

D18 광교중앙 (아주대) GwanggyoJungang (Ajou Univ.)
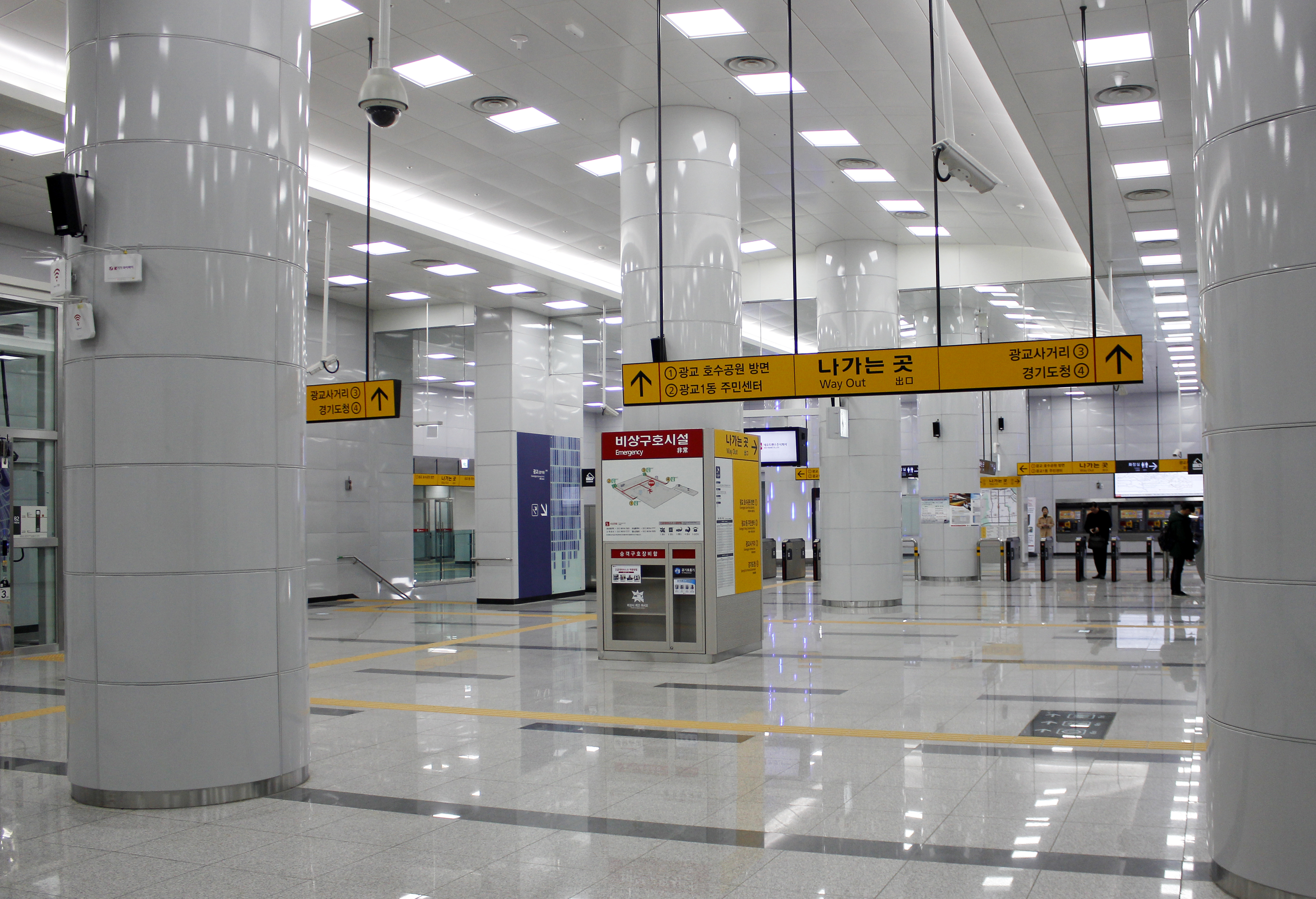

Korean name
- Hangul: 광교중앙역
- Hanja: 光敎中央驛
- Revised Romanization: Gwanggyojungang yeok
- McCune–Reischauer: Kwangkyochungang yŏk

General information
- Location: Iui-dong, Yeongtong-gu, Suwon, Gyeonggi-do
- Operator: Gyeonggi Railroad Co., Ltd.
- Line: Shinbundang Line
- Platforms: 2
- Tracks: 2

Construction
- Structure type: Underground

Key dates
- January 30, 2016: Shinbundang Line opened
Location

GwanggyoJungang (Ajou Univ.) Station is a major metro station located in Gwanggyo, Yeongtong-gu, Suwon, Gyeonggi-do, South Korea. Jungang means "center" in Korean, denoting the station's central location in Gwanggyo. The station is close to Ajou University and its hospital.

Forming the downtown of Gwanggyo new city, the Gyeonggi Provincial Office is scheduled to be built here and it is directly surrounded by many large shopping malls such as Avenue France and World Square, a Lotte outlet and cinema and the popular Gwanggyo lake park and cafe street.

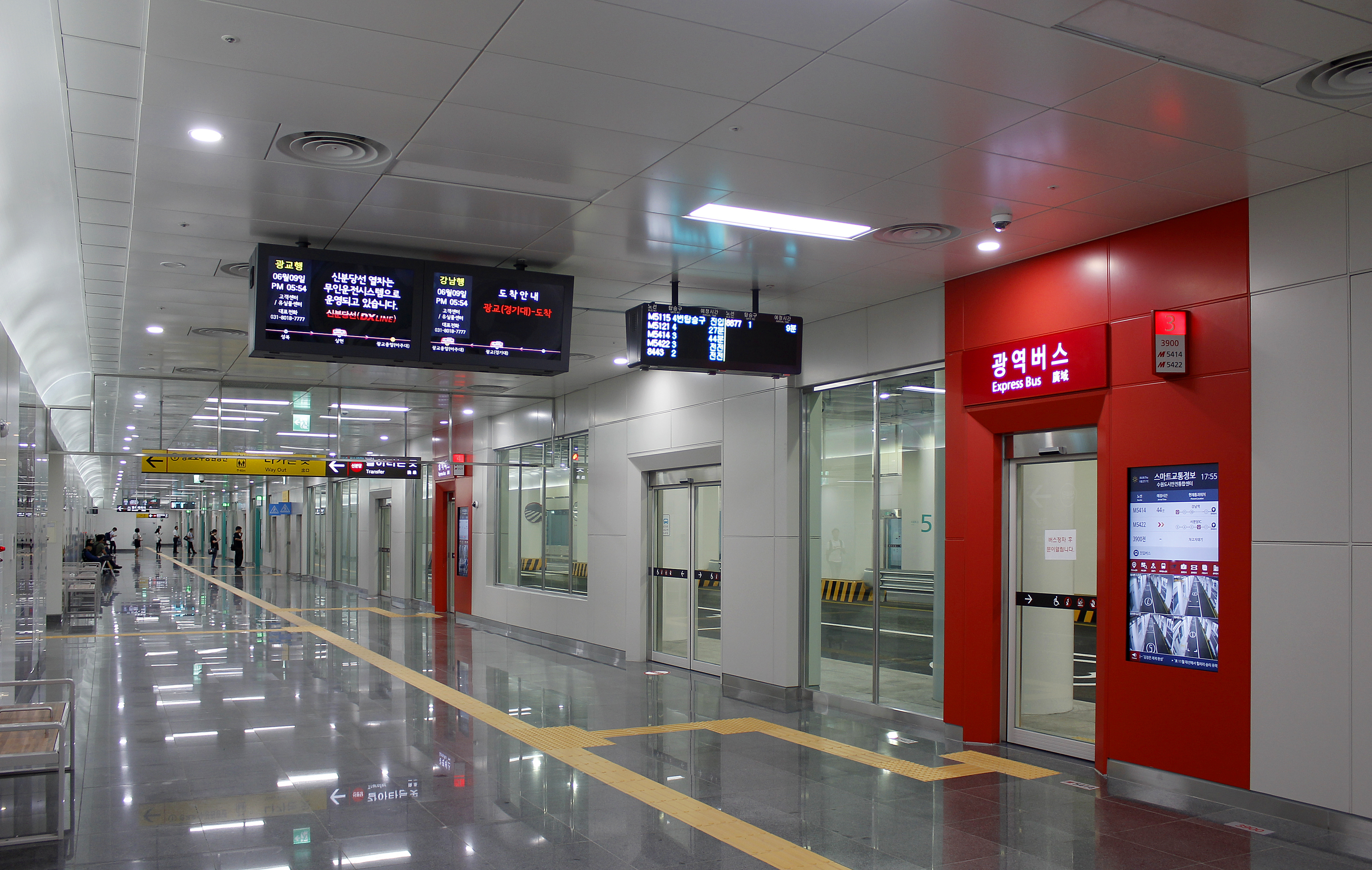
Underground bus transfer station

The station is the country's first subway station to have an underground bus transfer station which was planned to open in early March 2016, where screen doors are installed on bus platforms so bus riders from all over Suwon can transfer to the subway directly by walking down only one floor.

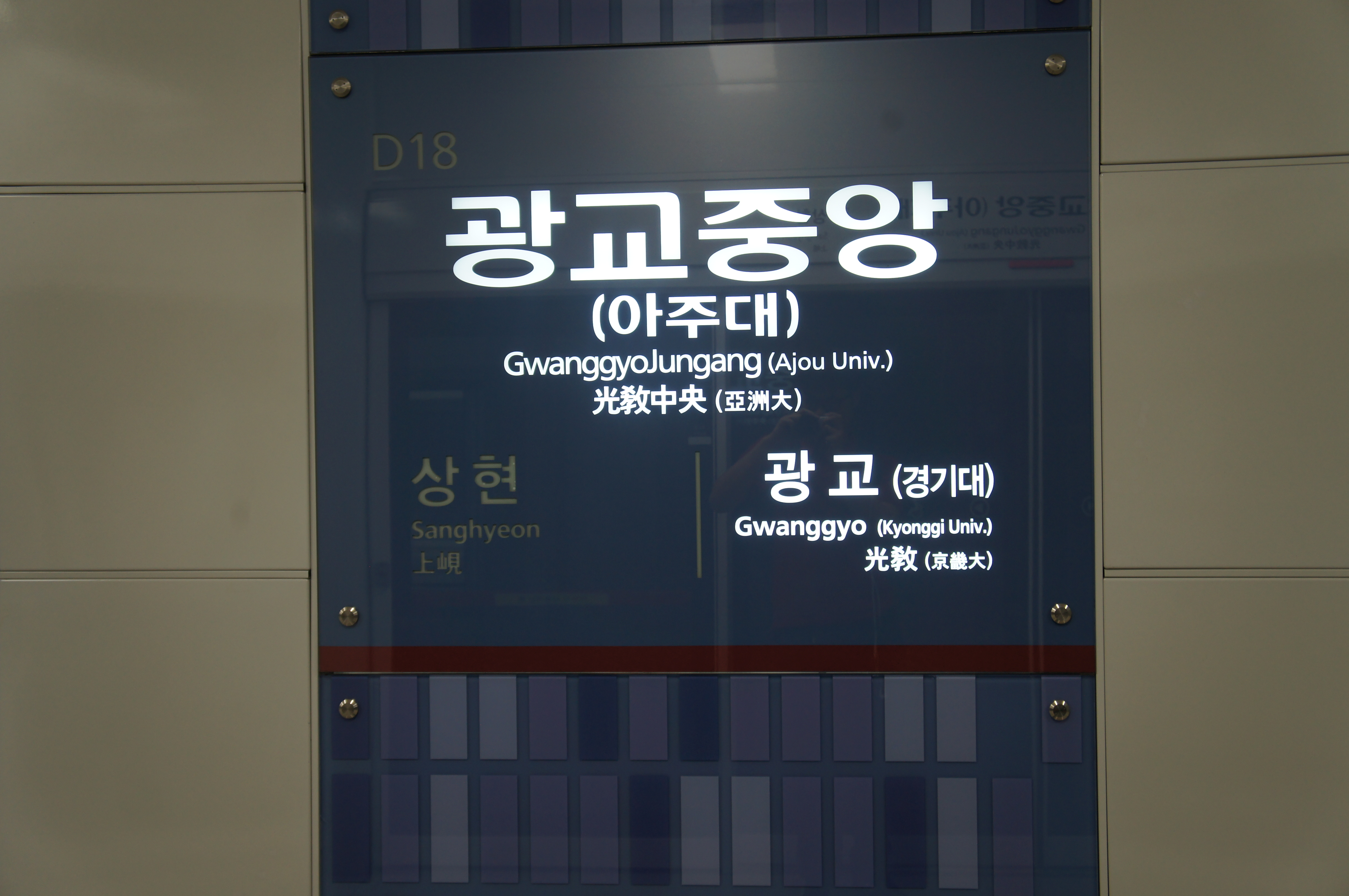
Station nameplate

Preceding station	Seoul Metropolitan Subway	Following station
Sanghyeon towards Sinsa	Shinbundang Line	Gwanggyo Terminus
