= Dongcheon station (Yongin) =

Metro station in Yongin, South Korea

Coordinates: 37.3379°N 127.1029°E

D14 동천 Dongcheon
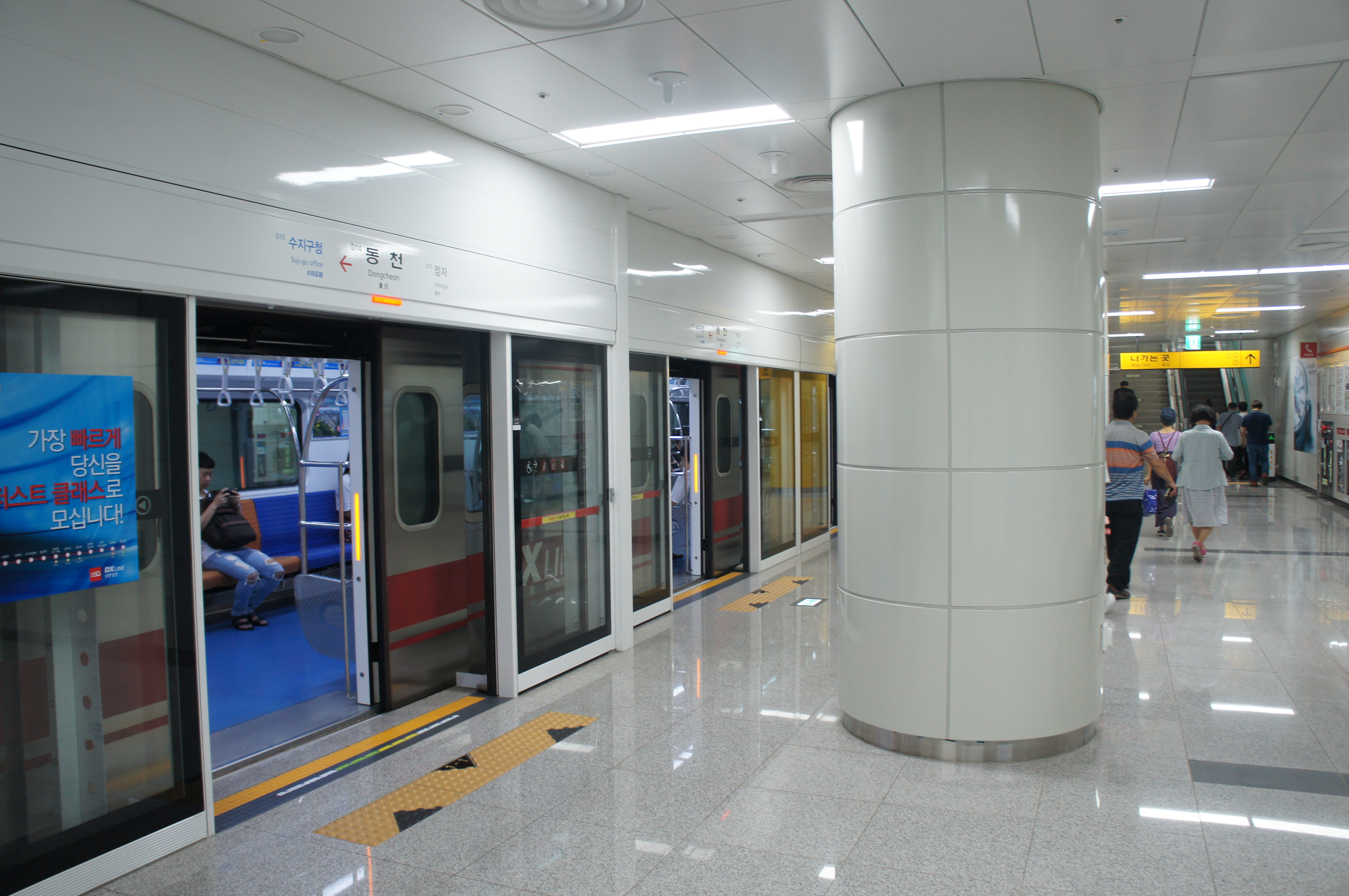

Korean name
- Hangul: 동천역
- Hanja: 東川驛
- Revised Romanization: Dongcheon yeok
- McCune–Reischauer: Tongch'ŏn yŏk

General information
- Location: Dongcheon-dong, Suji-gu, Yongin, Gyeonggi-do
- Operator: Gyeonggi Railroad Co., Ltd.
- Line: Shinbundang Line
- Platforms: 2
- Tracks: 2

Construction
- Structure type: Underground

Key dates
- January 30, 2016: Shinbundang Line opened
Location

Dongcheon Station is a metro station located in Dongcheon-dong, Suji District, Yongin, Gyeonggi Province, South Korea. It is located right next to the Gyeongbu Expressway and riders can immediately transfer to a bus on the highway via a bus transfer stop located directly at Exit 1.

Frequent riders from Dongcheon Station to Pangyo Station can claim a cashback once they fill discounts of 200 won for every ride until 5000 won, when it can be claimed.

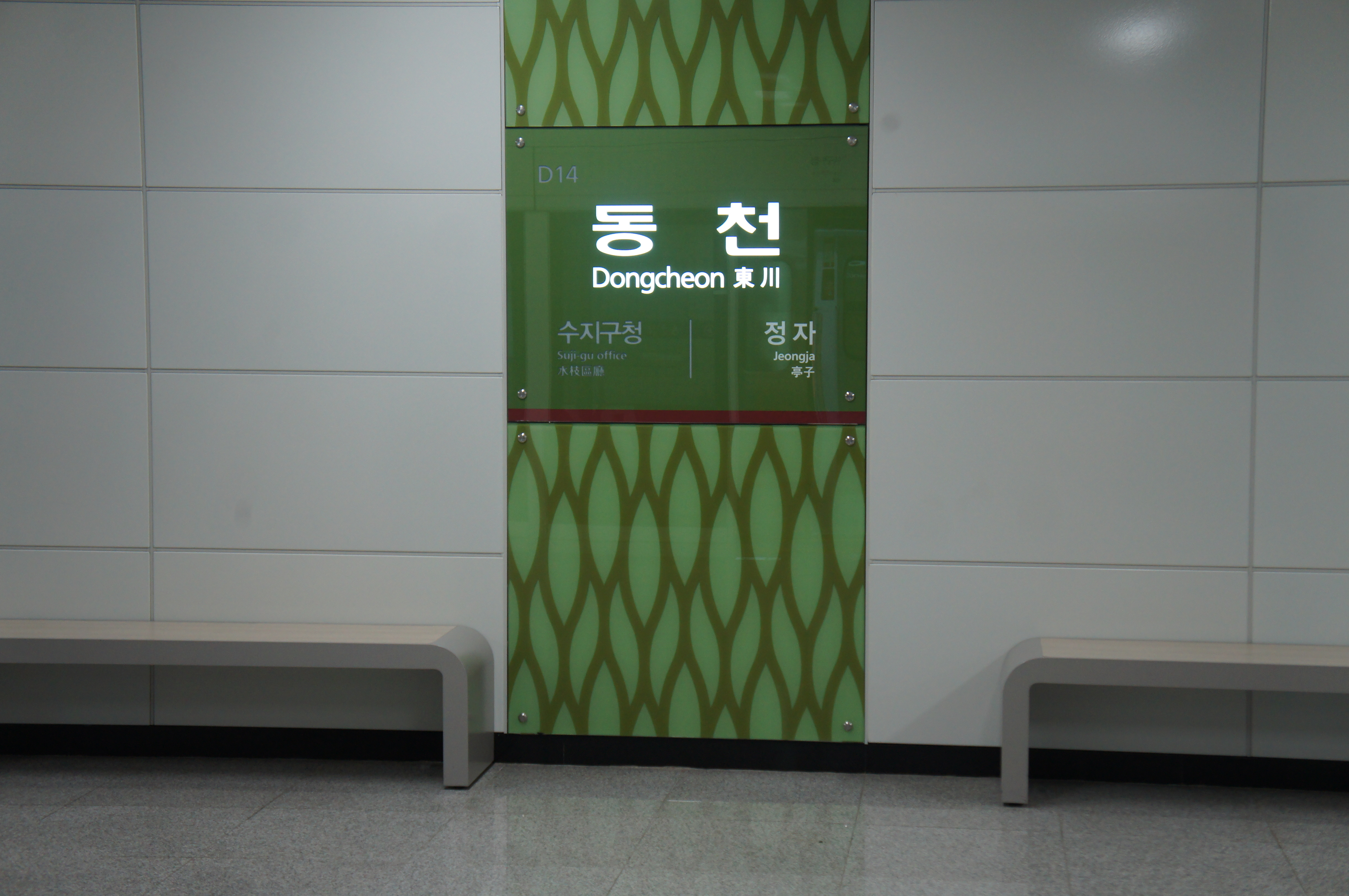
Station nameplate

Preceding station	Seoul Metropolitan Subway	Following station
Migeum towards Sinsa	Shinbundang Line	Suji-gu office towards Gwanggyo
