= Seongbok station =

Metro station in Yongin, South Korea

Coordinates: 37.3132°N 127.0802°E

D16 성복 Seongbok
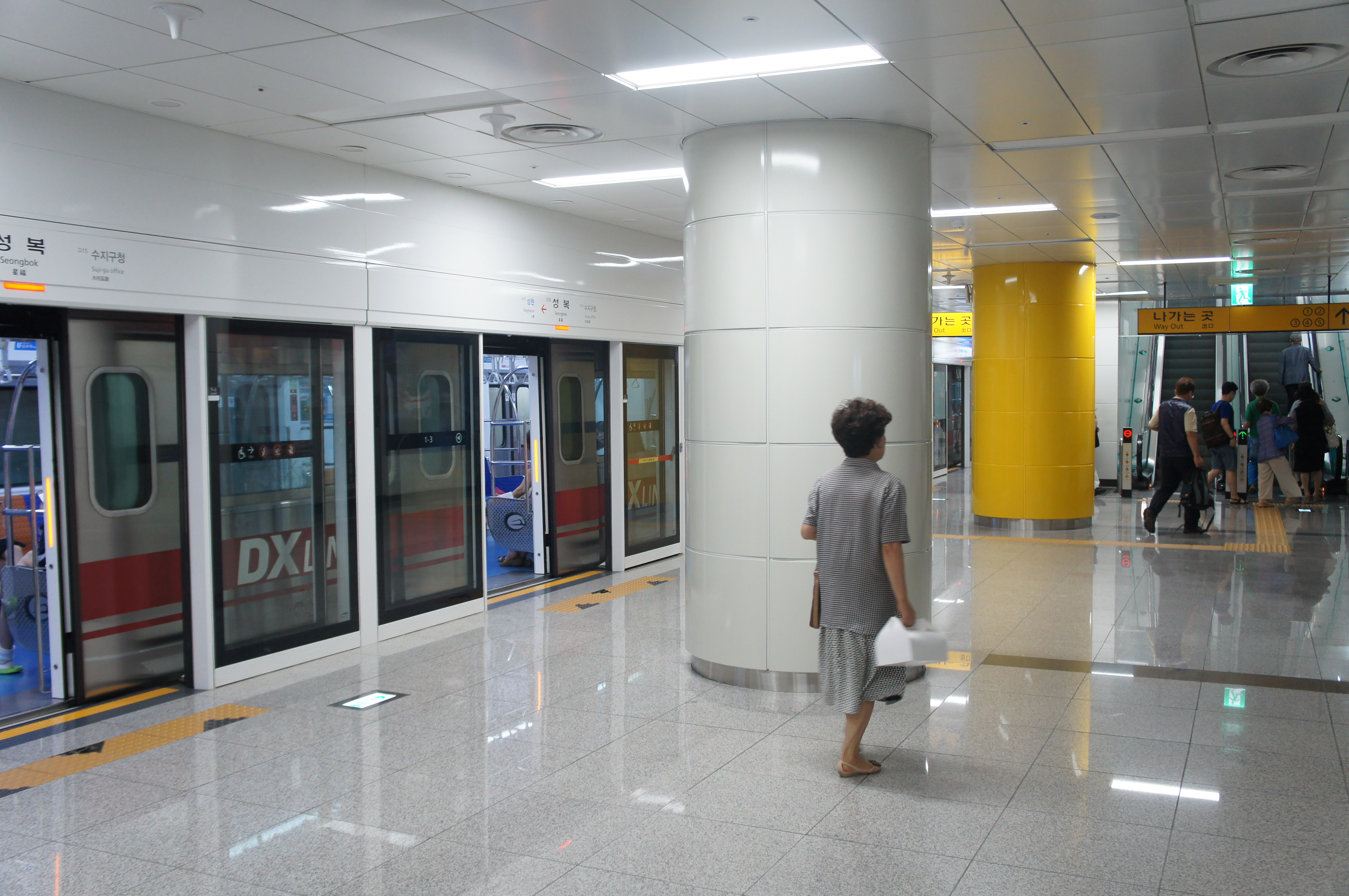

Korean name
- Hangul: 성복역
- Hanja: 星福驛
- Revised Romanization: Seongbok yeok
- McCune–Reischauer: Sŏngpok yŏk

General information
- Location: Seongbok-dong, Suji-gu, Yongin, Gyeonggi-do
- Operator: Gyeonggi Railroad Co., Ltd.
- Line: Shinbundang Line
- Platforms: 2
- Tracks: 2

Construction
- Structure type: Underground

Key dates
- January 30, 2016: Shinbundang Line opened
Location

Seongbok Station is a metro station located in Seongbok-dong, Suji-gu, Yongin, Gyeonggi-do, South Korea. The station has a popular cafe street and shopping mall called Day Park directly in front of Exit 4.

A large Lotte shopping mall larger than COEX in scale, is scheduled to be built between Exits 1 and 2, slated for opening in September 2019. This is the Lotte Mall Suji Branch, which is connected to the station. Nearby the station are four apartment complexes, three of them belonging to the Lotte Castle brand, and these complexes are also connected to Lotte Mall.

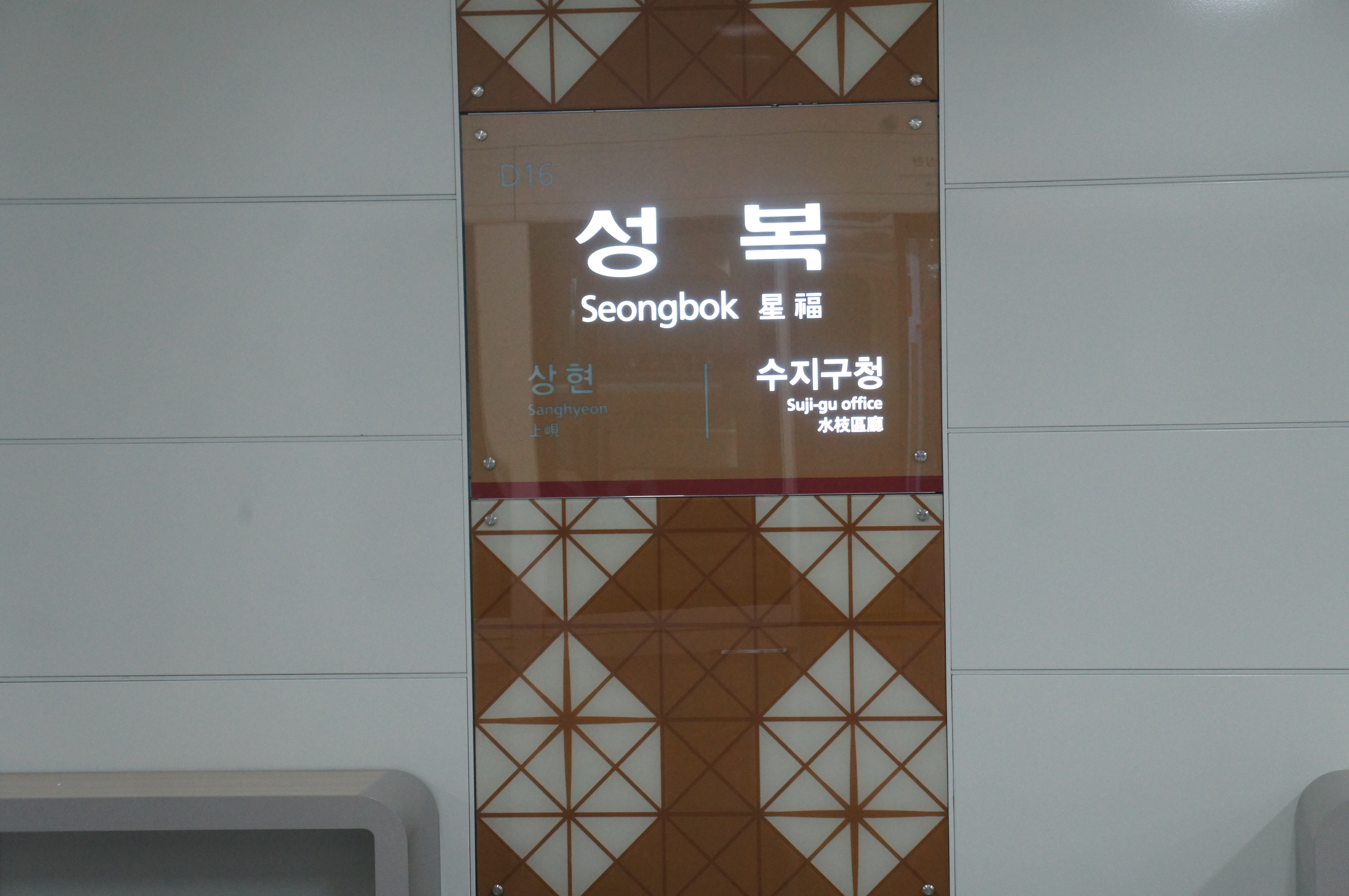
Station nameplate

Preceding station	Seoul Metropolitan Subway	Following station
Suji-gu office towards Sinsa	Shinbundang Line	Sanghyeon towards Gwanggyo
