= Suji-gu office station =

Metro station in Yongin, South Korea

Coordinates: 37.3228°N 127.0953°E

D15 수지구청 Suji-gu office
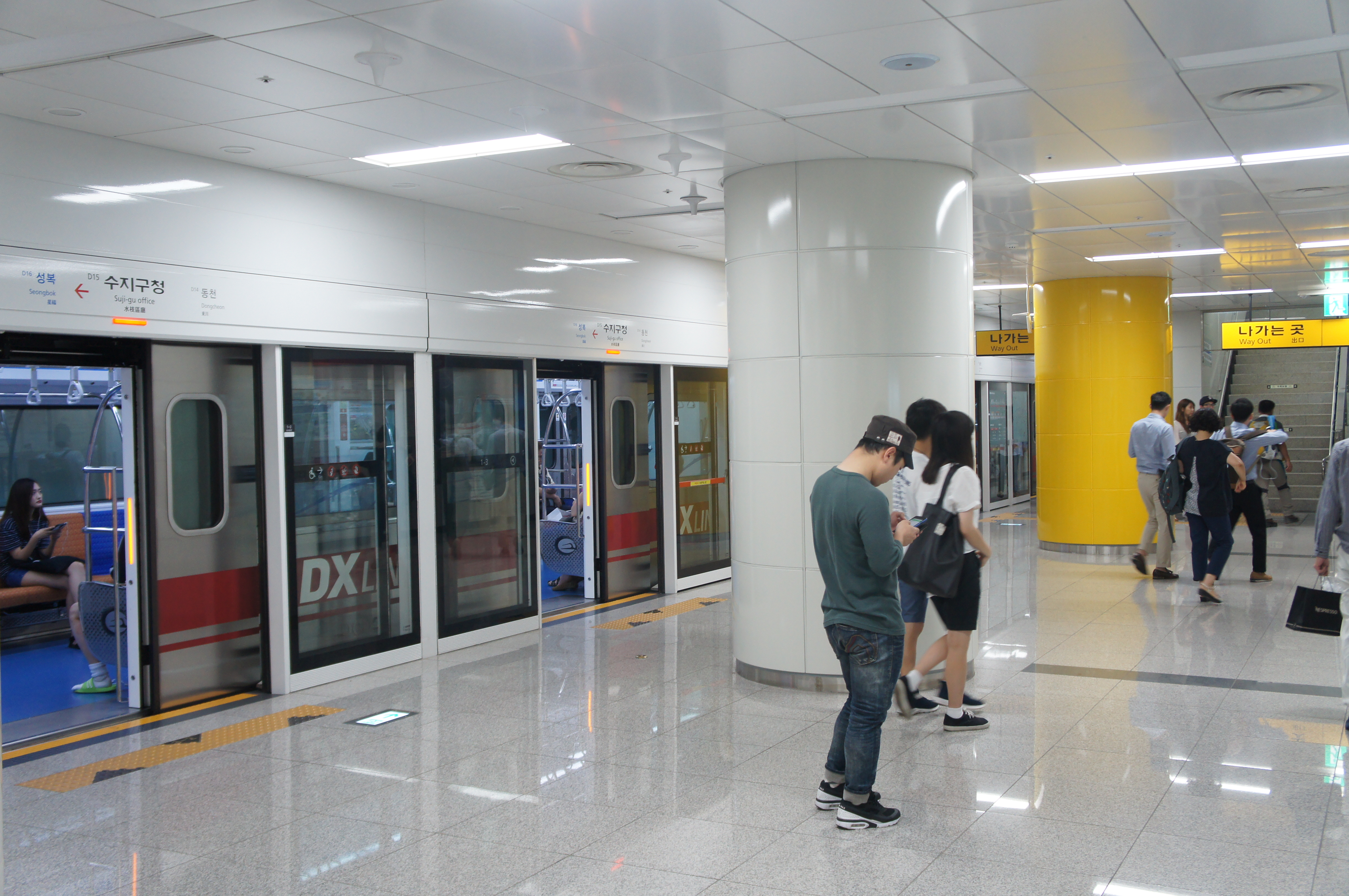

Korean name
- Hangul: 수지구청역
- Hanja: 水枝區廳驛
- Revised Romanization: Sujigucheong yeok
- McCune–Reischauer: Sochikuch'ŏng yŏk

General information
- Location: Pungdeokcheon-dong, Suji-gu, Yongin, Gyeonggi-do
- Operator: Gyeonggi Railroad Co., Ltd.
- Line: Shinbundang Line
- Platforms: 2
- Tracks: 2

Construction
- Structure type: Underground

Key dates
- January 30, 2016: Shinbundang Line opened
Location

Suji-gu office Station is a metro station located in Pungdeokcheon-dong, Suji-gu, Yongin, Gyeonggi-do, South Korea. The station is decorated with a holographic aquarium.

It is located at the center of the Suji-gu district and the district office, surrounded by many shops, restaurants, cafés, bars, clinics and banks. The Royal Sports Center, which houses large swimming pools, is located directly in front of the station. A large Lotte Mart with Toys R Us is also located nearby.

A sinkhole was formed nearby the station on April 21, 2025.

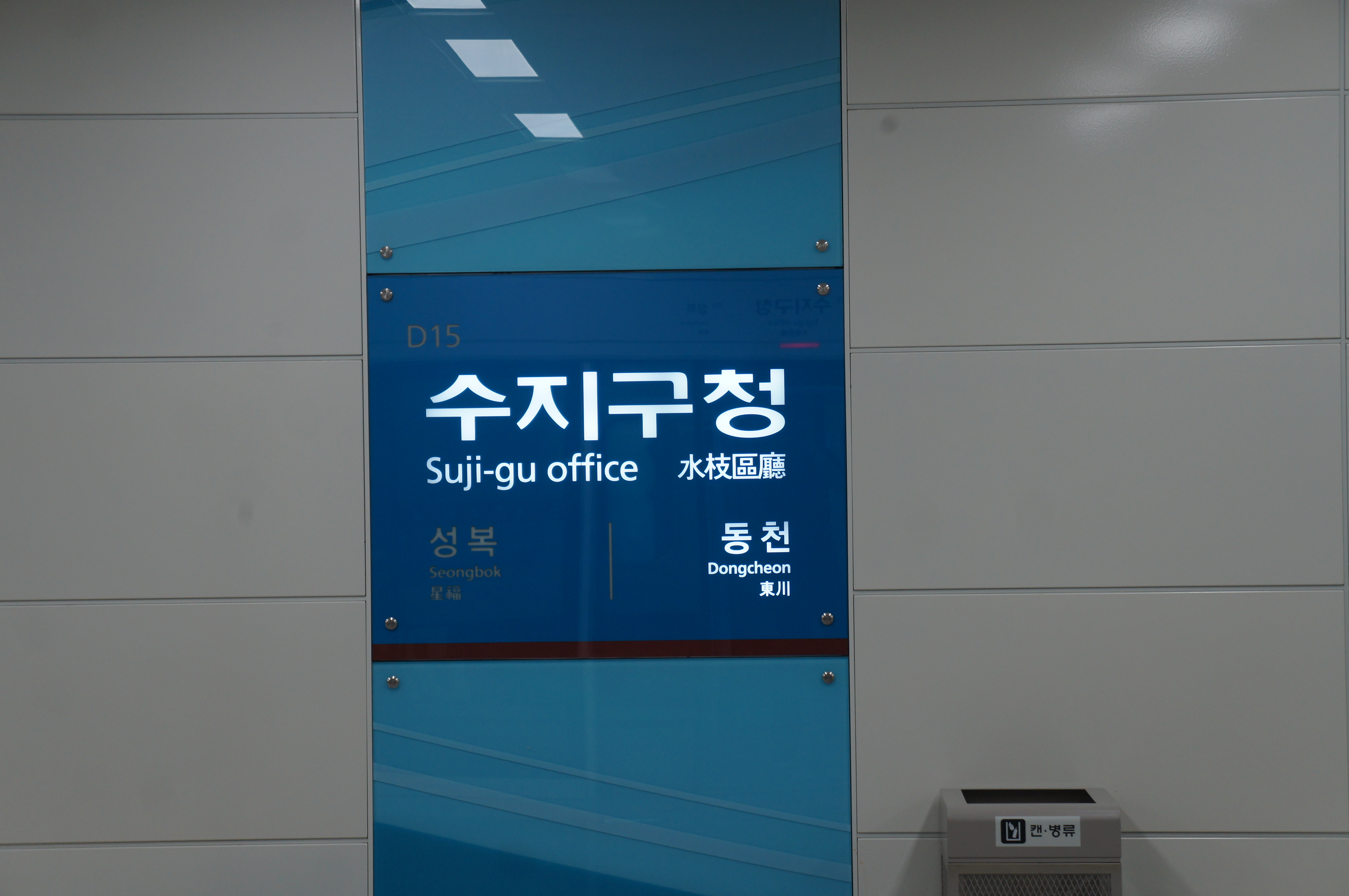
Station nameplate

Preceding station	Seoul Metropolitan Subway	Following station
Dongcheon towards Sinsa	Shinbundang Line	Seongbok towards Gwanggyo
