= Gwanggyo =

Gwanggyo may refer to:

- Gwanggyo (Korean: 광교; Hanja: 廣橋), a historic bridge over Cheonggyecheon in Seoul, South Korea
- Gwanggyo New Town (Korean: 광교신도시; Hanja: 光敎新都市), a South Korean planned city built on Suwon city and Yongin city in 2010s
