= Migeum station =

Metro station in Seongnam, South Korea

Coordinates: 37°20′59.92″N 127°06′32.22″E

미금 (분당서울대병원); Migeum (Seoul National University Bundang Hospital)
D13
미금 (분당서울대병원)
Migeum
(Seoul National University Bundang Hospital)
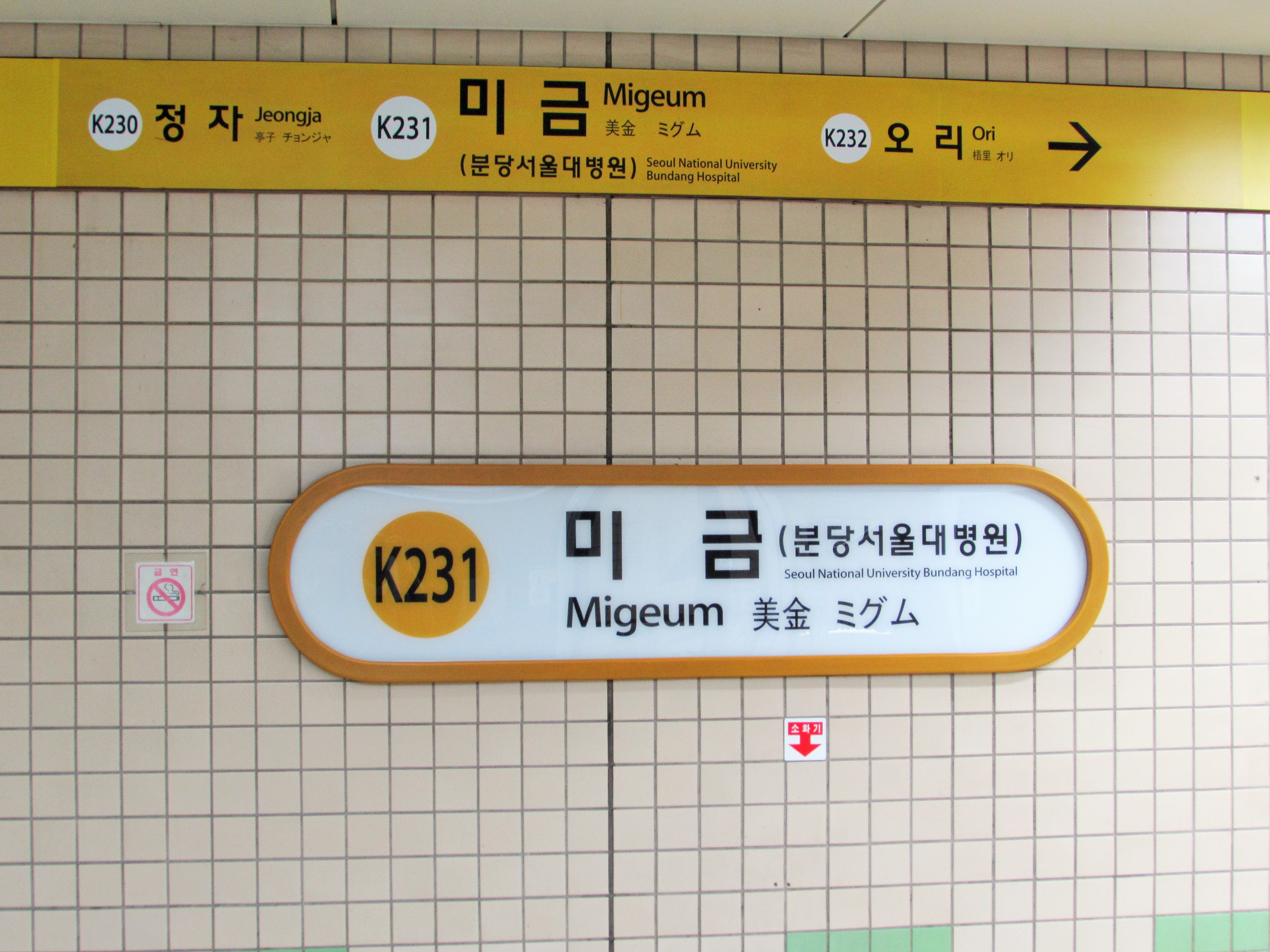
- Suin-Bundang Line station name sign

Korean name
- Hangul: 미금역
- Hanja: 美金驛
- Revised Romanization: Migeum-yeok
- McCune–Reischauer: Migŭm-yŏk

General information
- Location: 222 Geumgok-dong, Bundang-gu, Seongnam-si, Gyeonggi-do
- Operator: Korail; Gyeonggi Railroad Co., Ltd.
- Lines: Suin–Bundang Line; Shinbundang Line
- Platforms: 4
- Tracks: 4

Construction
- Structure type: Underground

Key dates
- September 1, 1994: Suin–Bundang Line opened
- April 28, 2018: Shinbundang Line opened
Location

Migeum station is a subway station located in Geumgok-dong. It is between Jeongja station and Ori station on the Suin–Bundang Line. It became a transfer station to the Shinbundang Line in April 2018.

There was a debate between Seongnam City and Suwon City regarding whether Migeum should be included in the Phase 2 extension of Shinbundang Line. Supporters argued that the distance between Jeongja Station and Dongcheon Station would be unusually long at 3.76 km. They also argued that the inclusion of Migeum will alleviate traffic in the area. On the other hand, opposition in Suwon claims that the inclusion would delay travel time to Gwanggyo, a planned area of Suwon in construction.

One of the largest commercial districts in Bundang, Migeum has a variety of boutiques, Korean and Western restaurants, chicken-and-beer restaurants, karaoke places, Korean-style barbecues, hagwons, and a 2001 Outlet department store. The Tancheon stream is close by.

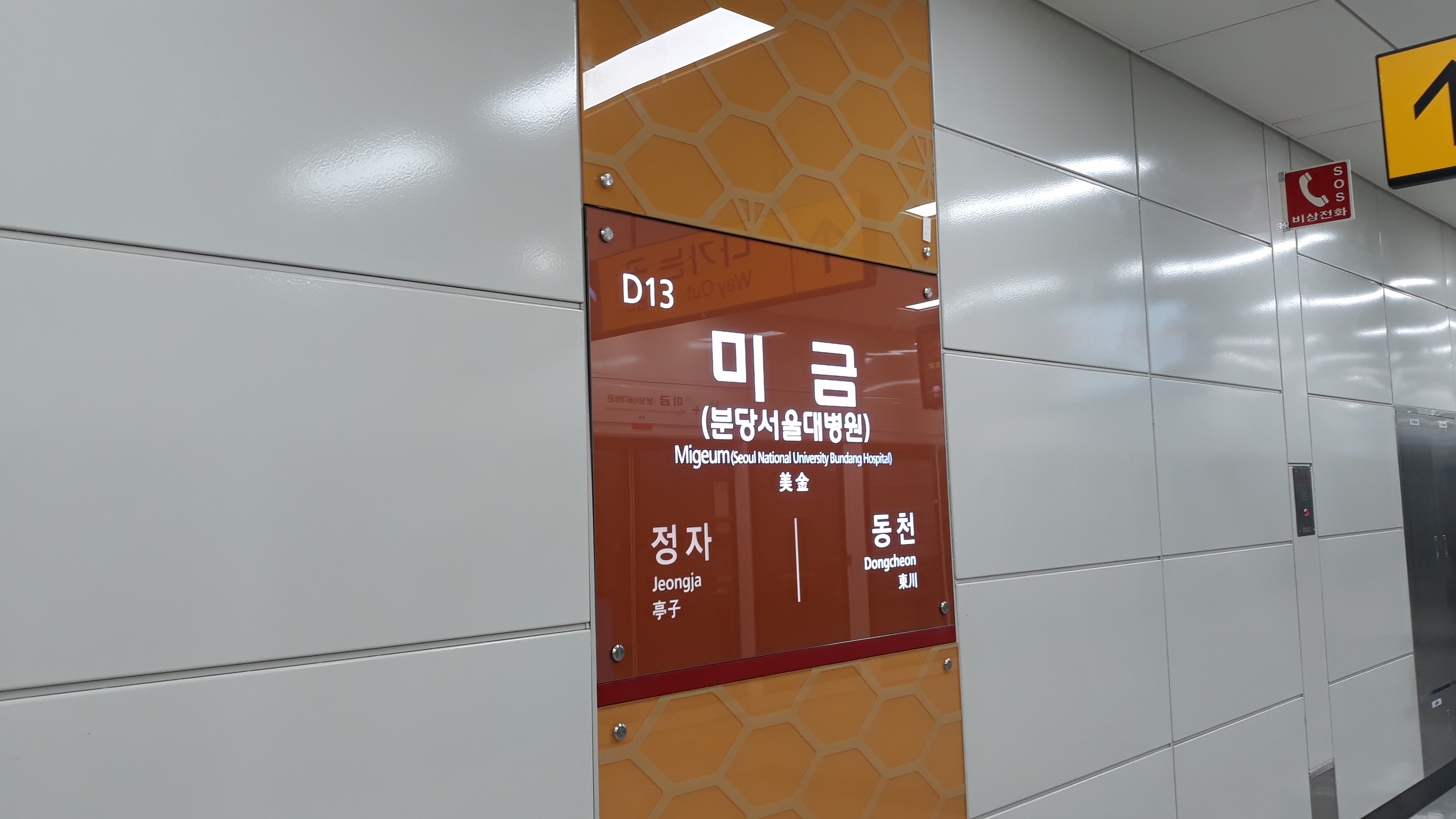
Shinbundang Line station name sign

Preceding station	Seoul Metropolitan Subway	Following station
Jeongja towards Cheongnyangni	Suin–Bundang Line	Ori towards Incheon
Jeongja towards Sinsa	Shinbundang Line	Dongcheon towards Gwanggyo
