= Gangnam station =

Line 2 station on the Seoul Subway

Coordinates: 37°29′52.54″N 127°1′39.30″E

강남 (하루플란트치과); Gangnam (Haruplant Dental Clinic)
D07
강남
Gangnam
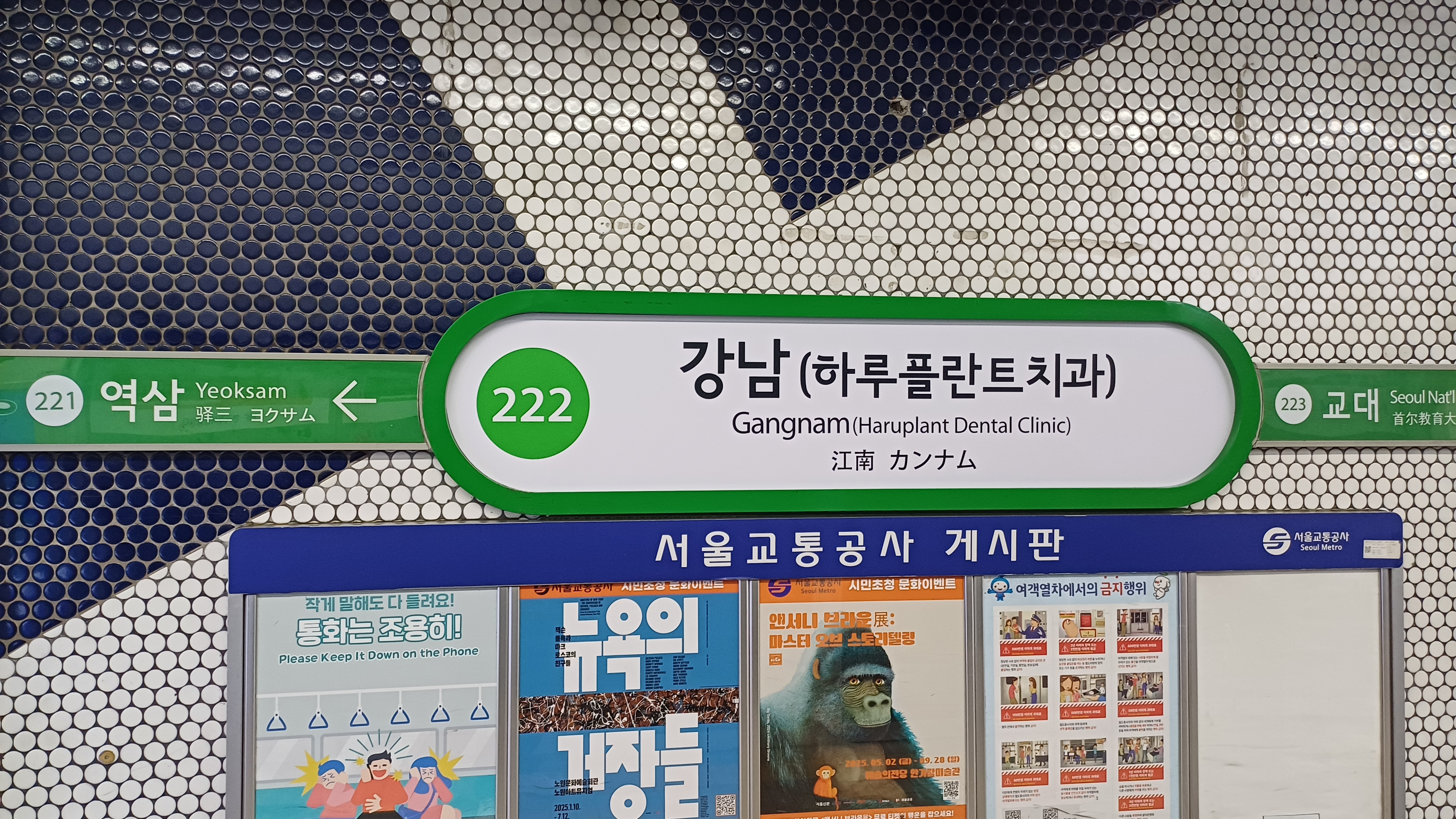
- Station Sign (Line 2)

Korean name
- Hangul: 강남역
- Hanja: 江南驛
- RR: Gangnam-yeok
- MR: Kangnam-yŏk

General information
- Location: 804 Yeoksam 2-dong, 303 Gangnamdaero Jiha, Gangnam-gu, Seoul
- Operator: Seoul Metro; Shinbundang Railroad Corporation
- Lines: Line 2 Shinbundang Line
- Platforms: 4
- Tracks: 4

Construction
- Structure type: Underground

Key dates
- December 23, 1982: Line 2 opened
- October 28, 2011: Shinbundang Line opened

Passengers
- (Daily) Based on Jan-Dec of 2012. Line 2: 207,410; Shinbundang Line: 19,856

Services
Preceding station	Seoul Metropolitan Subway	Following station
Yeoksam Next counterclockwise	Line 2	Seoul National University of Education Next clockwise
Sinnonhyeon towards Sinsa	Shinbundang Line	Yangjae towards Gwanggyo
Location

Gangnam station (Korean: 강남역) is a station on Line 2 of the Seoul Metropolitan Subway. The station is located within the Greater Gangnam Area between the Gangnam and Seocho Districts of Seoul, South Korea. The station is the busiest station on the Seoul Metropolitan Subway, serving over 70,000 daily passengers on average.

This station serves as a crucial transfer point between Line 2 and buses to all over Seoul and southern Gyeonggi Province. It became the northern terminus of the Shinbundang Line on October 29, 2011 until May 28, 2022 when it was extended north to Sinsa, whereas the southern terminus being at Gwanggyo.

Both stations have two tracks and two side platforms.

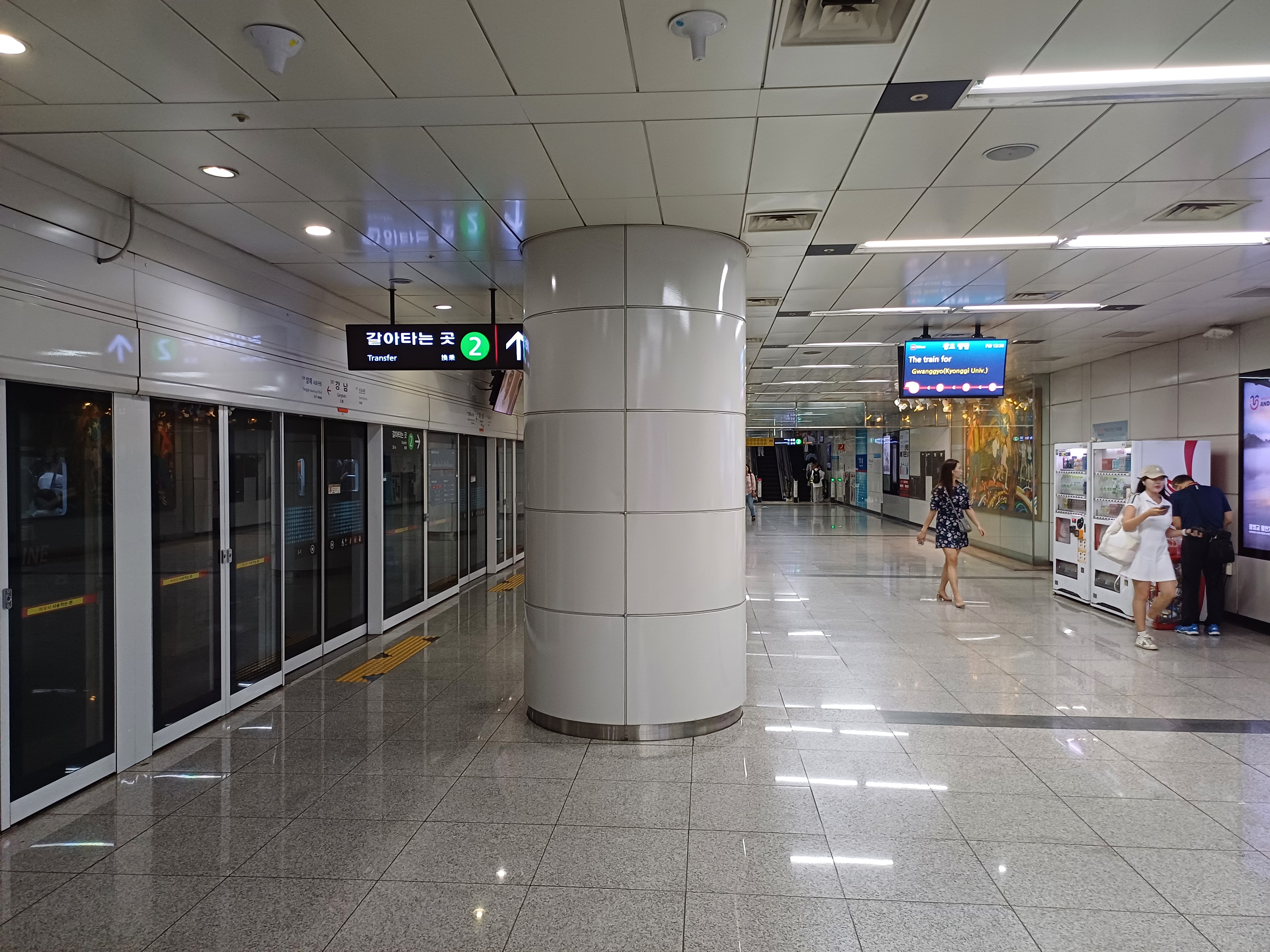
Shinbundang Line platform

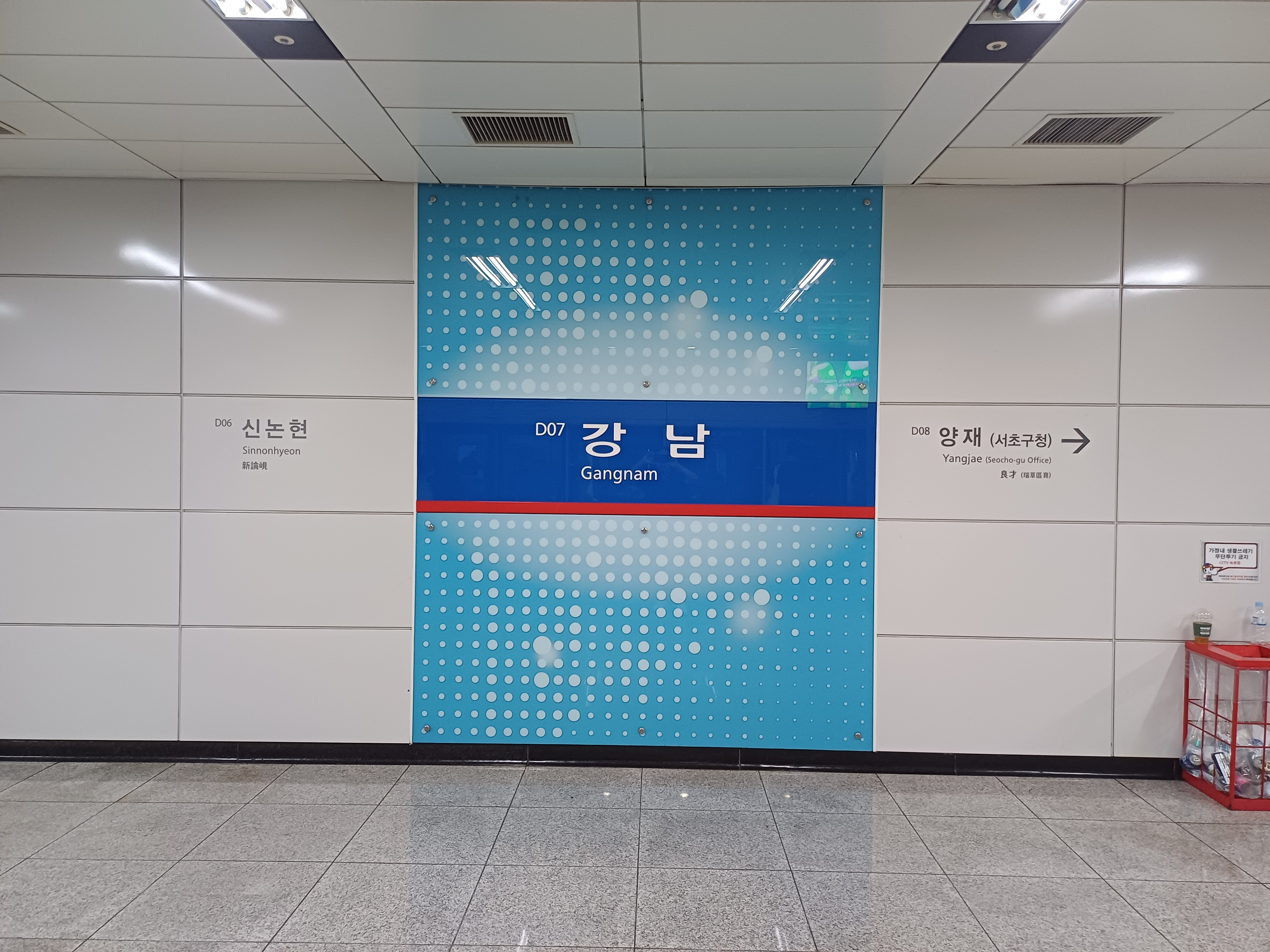
Station sign (Shinbundang Line)

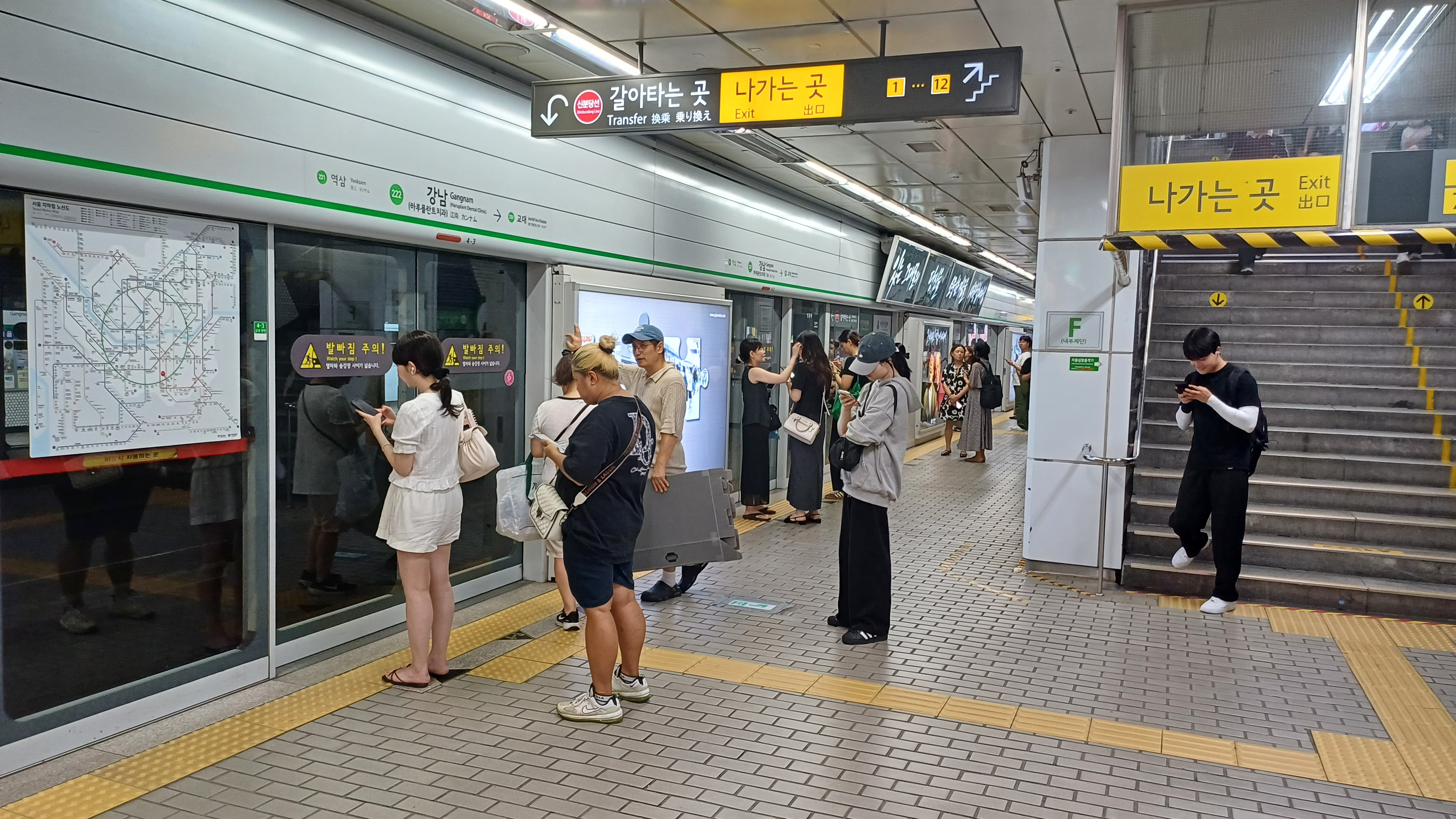
Line 2 platform

== History ==
- December 9, 1982 - The station name was decided to be 'Gangnam Station'.
- December 23, 1982 - Line 2 station completed.
- October 29, 2011 - Shinbundang Line station completed.

== The station ==
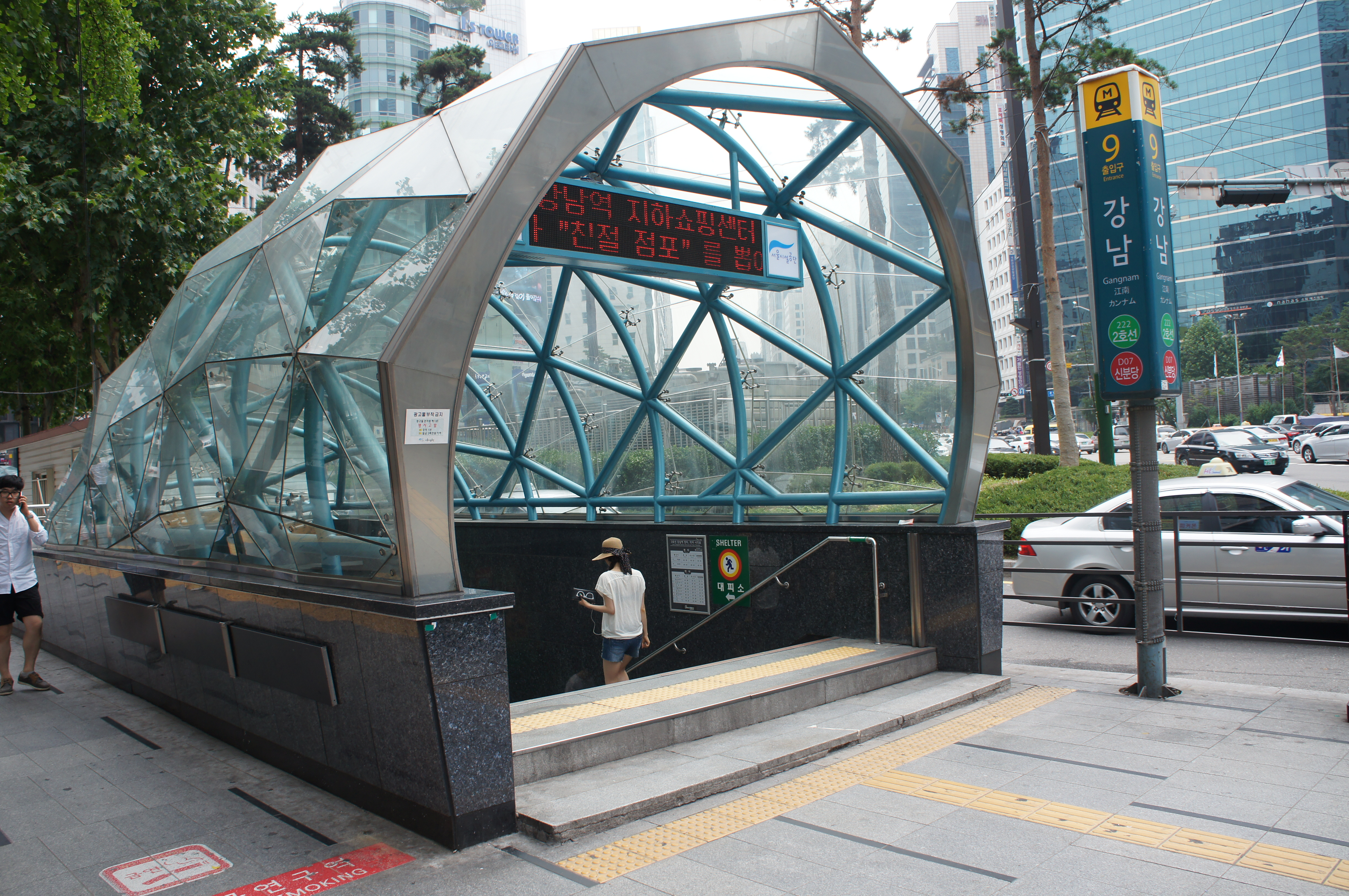
Entrance number 9 to the station

The area surrounding the station is an important commercial and entertainment district. The station is located at the western end of Teheranno, home to many corporate headquarters and impressive towers, while the area immediately to the north of the station is densely packed with bars, restaurants and clubs. There are also many shops in the subway station below ground. In 2007, the area was the 10th most expensive shopping street in the world with an average rent of US$431 per square foot.

The section of Gangnam Boulevard from exit No.2 of this station to exit No.5 of Sinnonhyeon Station of Line 9 is designated as a smoke-free zone by the Gangnam District office.

Line 2 runs on the right hand track, whereas the Shinbundang Line runs on the left hand track; this is because the Shinbundang Line is a national railway line (which typically runs on the left), while Line 2 is a subway line (which typically runs on the right in Seoul). This can be confusing to tourists making a transfer here, as many tourists are accustomed to riding on either the left-hand track or the right-hand track.

== Station layout ==
G	Street level	Exit
L1; Concourse	Lobby	Customer Service, Shops, Vending machines, ATMs
L2; Platform level	Side platform, doors will open on the right
L2; Platform level	Inner circle	← Line 2 Next clockwise (Seoul Nat'l Univ. of Education)
L2; Platform level	Outer circle	Line 2 Next counterclockwise (Yeoksam) →
L2; Platform level	Side platform, doors will open on the right
L3; Platform level	Side platform, doors will open on the left
L3; Platform level	Southbound	Shinbundang Line toward Gwanggyo (Yangjae) →
L3; Platform level	Northbound	← Shinbundang Line toward Sinsa (Sinnonhyeon)
L3; Platform level	Side platform, doors will open on the left

== Passenger load ==
In 2007, it was the busiest subway station in the Seoul Metropolitan Subway system, with approximately 123,000 daily passengers using it on average.

In a survey conducted in 2011 by the Ministry of Land, Transport and Maritime Affairs on 92 Administrative divisions across the country, it reported that Gangnam station had a daily average of 110,129 people boarding and 114,338 people alighting the subway. Making this the busiest public transit stop, with more than 100,000 people every day.

== Vicinity ==
- Exit 1: KIPO Seoul Office, Yeoksam Tax Office
- Exit 8: Kukkiwon (World Taekwondo Headquarters)
- Exit 10 : Seoul Seocho Elementary School
- Exit 12 : Yeoksam Post Office, National Library for Children and Young Adults

The headquarters of South Korean skincare and cosmetics manufacturer Skin Food is in the DaeRyung Scecho Tower in Seocho-dong, Seocho District nearby to this station.
