= Shinbundang Line =

Driverless subway line in Gyeonggi-do and Seoul, South Korea

Shinbundang Line (DX Line)
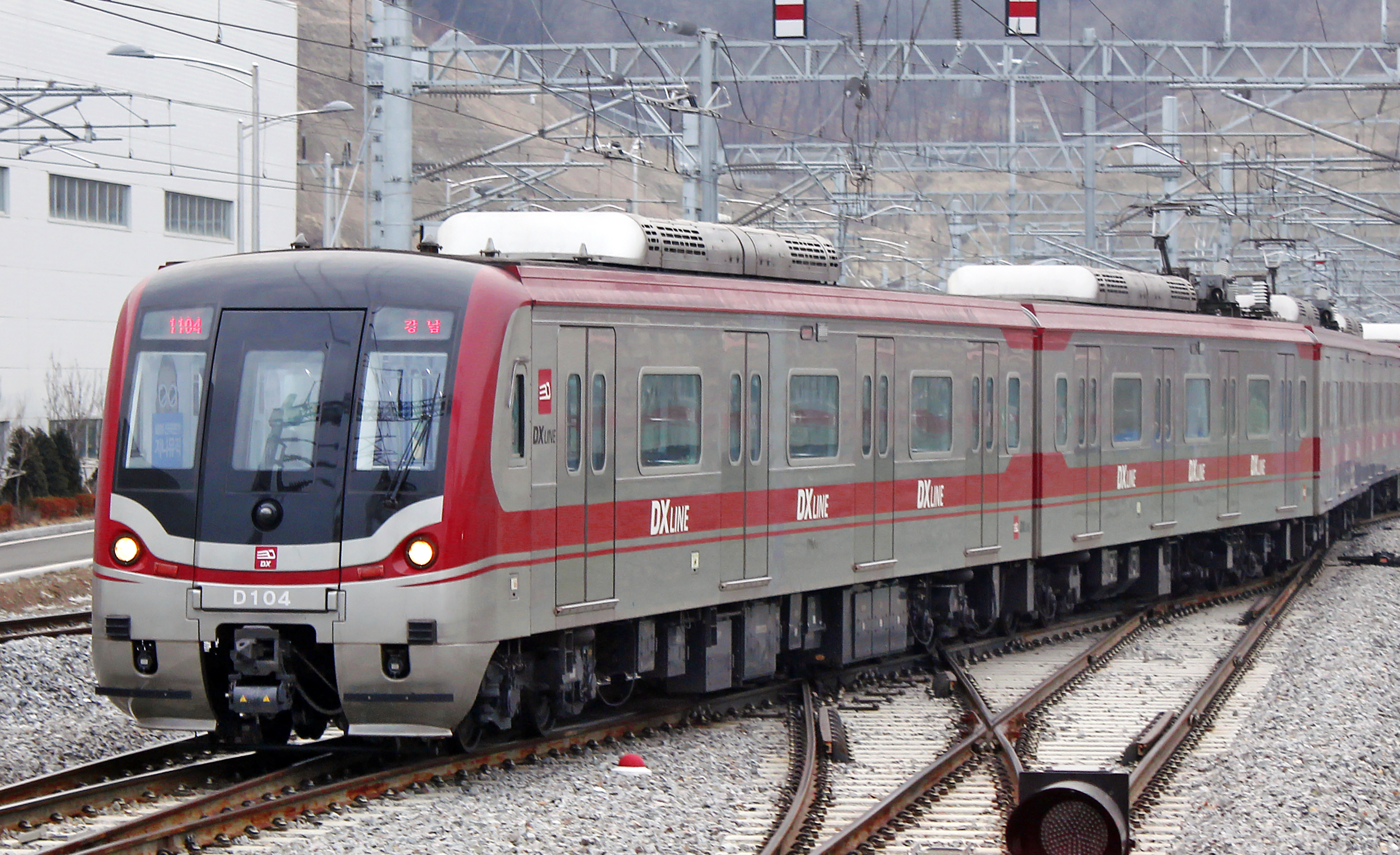
- Shinbundang line train

Overview
- Native name: 신분당선(新盆唐線); Sinbundangseon
- Status: Operational
- Termini: Sinsa; Gwanggyo
- Stations: 16

Service
- Type: Commuter Rail
- System: Seoul Metropolitan Subway
- Operator(s): Shinbundang Railroad Corporation, Gyeonggi Railroad Co., Ltd., New Seoul Railroad Co., Ltd., Neo Trans

History
- Opened: 28 October 2011; 15 years ago

Technical
- Line length: 33.4 km (20.8 mi)
- Number of tracks: 2
- Track gauge: 1,435 mm (4 ft 8 1/2 in) standard gauge
- Electrification: 25 kV, 60 Hz AC

The Shinbundang Line (Korean: 신분당선; Hanja: 新盆唐線; literally, New Bundang Line) or DX Line for Dynamic Express Line is a 33.4 km (20.8 mi) long line of the Seoul Metropolitan Subway. It is the world's fifth subway to run completely driverless and the second completely driverless metro line to open in South Korea, after Busan Subway Line 4. It connects Sinsa station and Gwanggyo station in 42 minutes, a feat achieved by being the first line to operate South Korea's next-generation subway car travelling at over 90 km/h (56 mph), with the fastest average speed of any subway line in the country.

The initial route opened in October 2011 passed through 6 stations intersecting with three existing lines at Gangnam station (Line 2), Yangjae station (Line 3), and Jeongja station (Bundang Line). Phase 2 opened on 30 January 2016 added 6 stations to the south, extending the line to serve Yongin's Suji-gu and Suwon's Gwanggyo New Town. Construction for Phase 3's extension northwards to Sinsa station started in 2016, with opening on 28 May 2022. Construction of the line started in mid-2005, for revenue start in September 2011. However, because of the flooding of late July 2011, the opening was delayed and eventually opened on 28 October 2011.

Gwanggyo Jungang (Ajou Univ.) station opened its underground bus transfer station in early March 2016, where screen doors are installed on bus platforms so bus riders from all over Suwon can transfer to the subway directly.

The price to ride the Shinbundang Line is higher than standard fare for the rest of the Seoul subway system. There are zone based surcharges in addition to regular fares which are identical to other lines.

== Phases ==
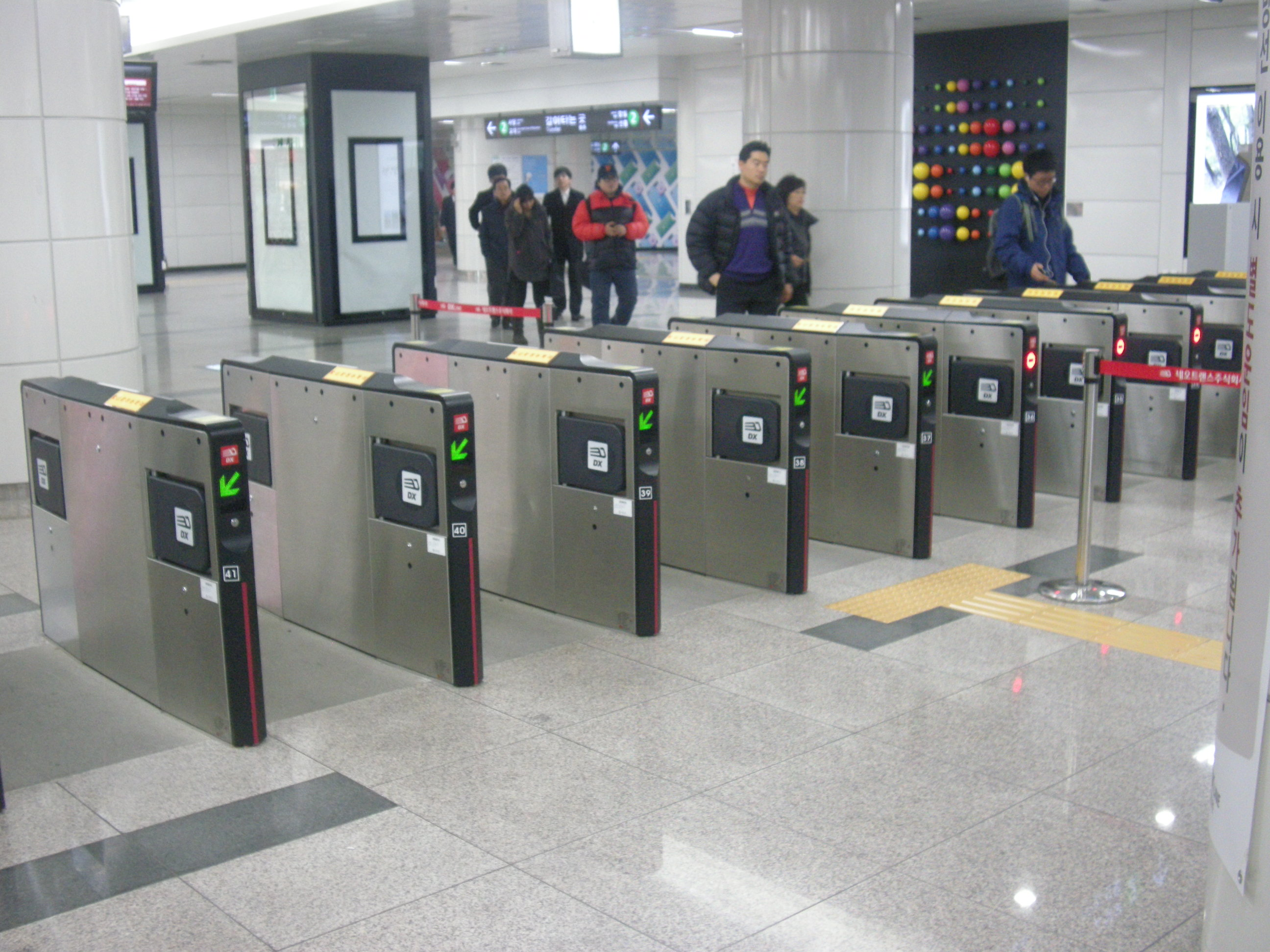
Transfer gate to Seoul Subway Line 2 at Gangnam station

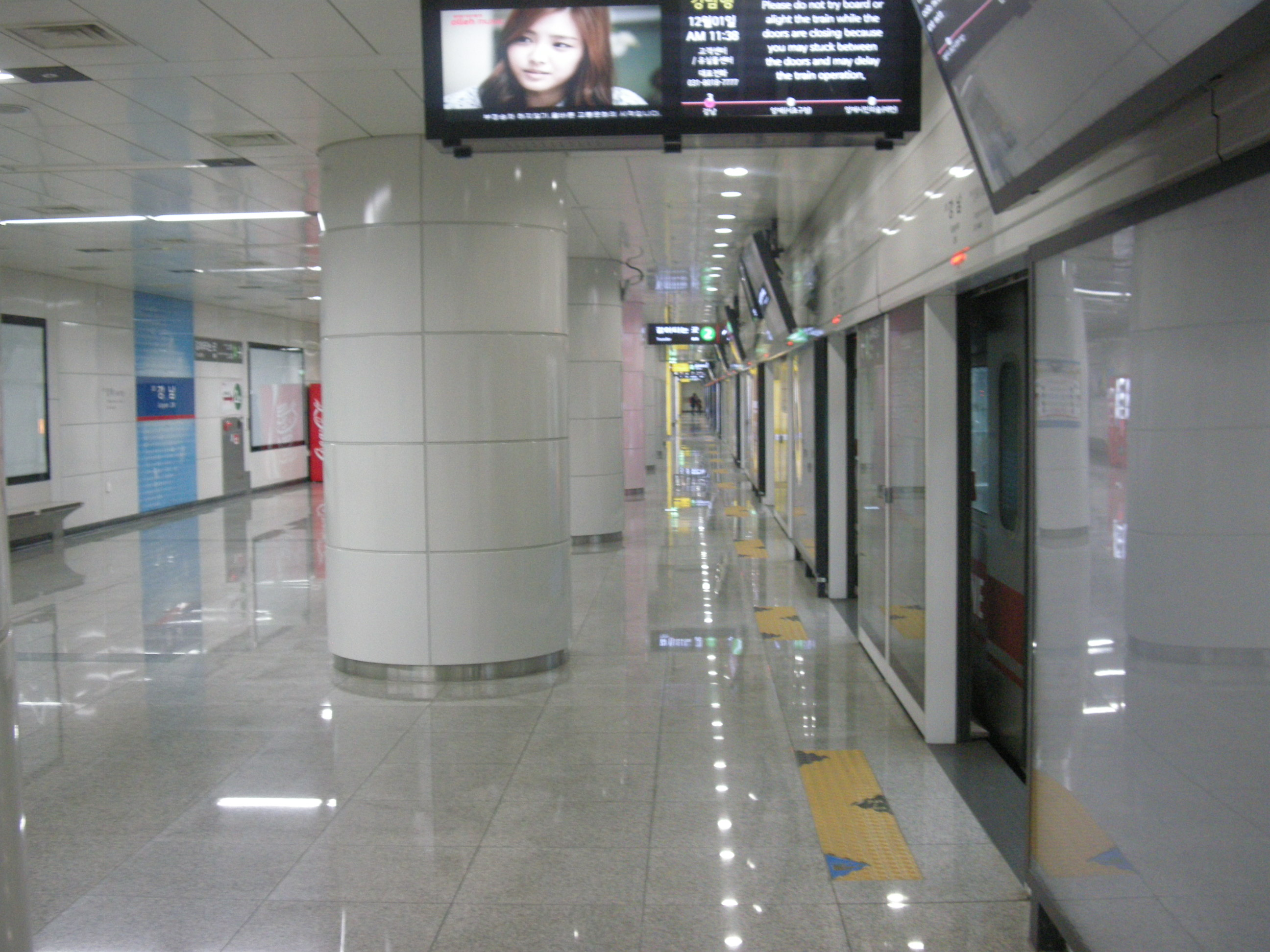
Gangnam station platform

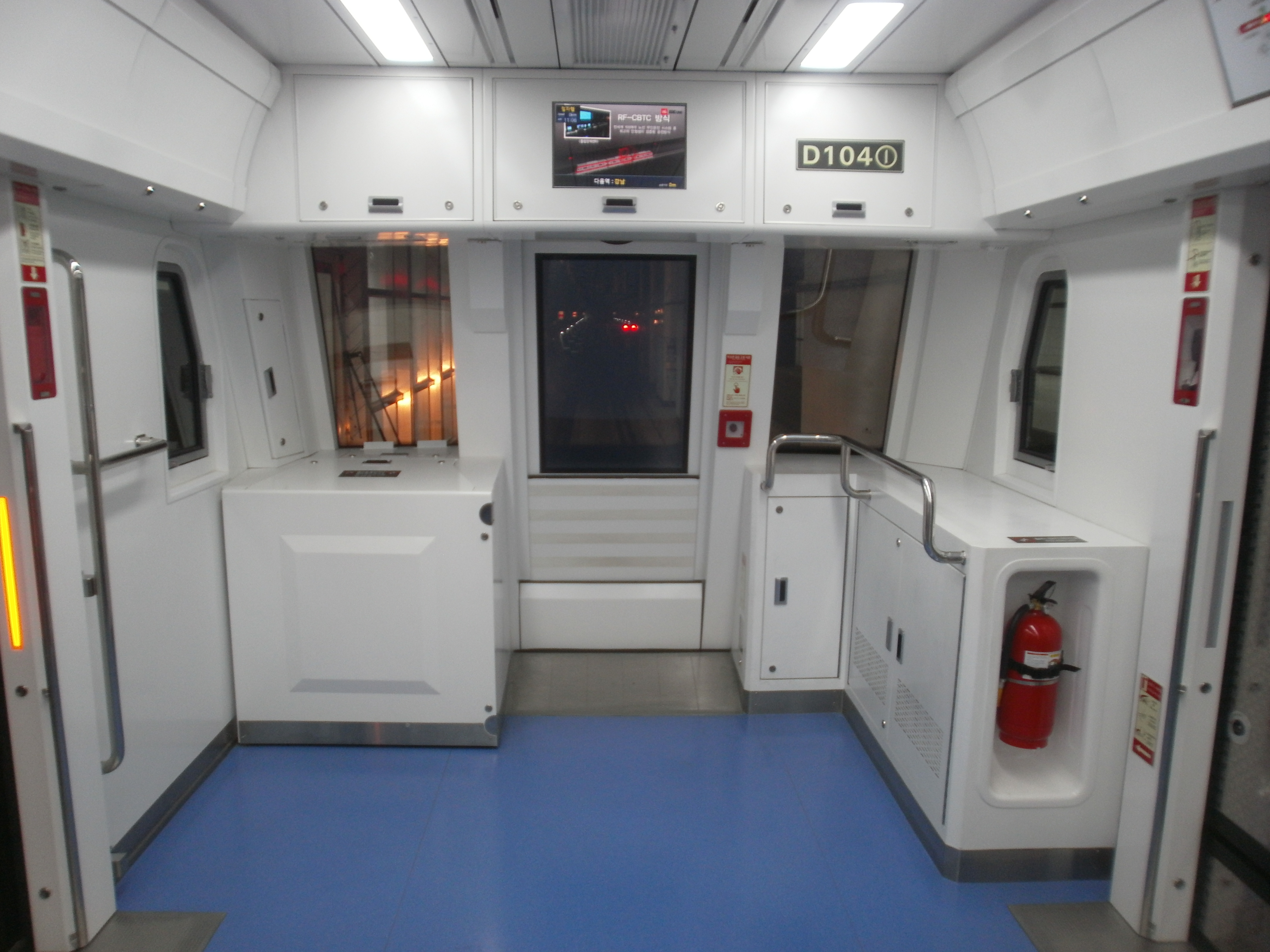
The front of the subway car is open for viewing thanks to driverless operation.

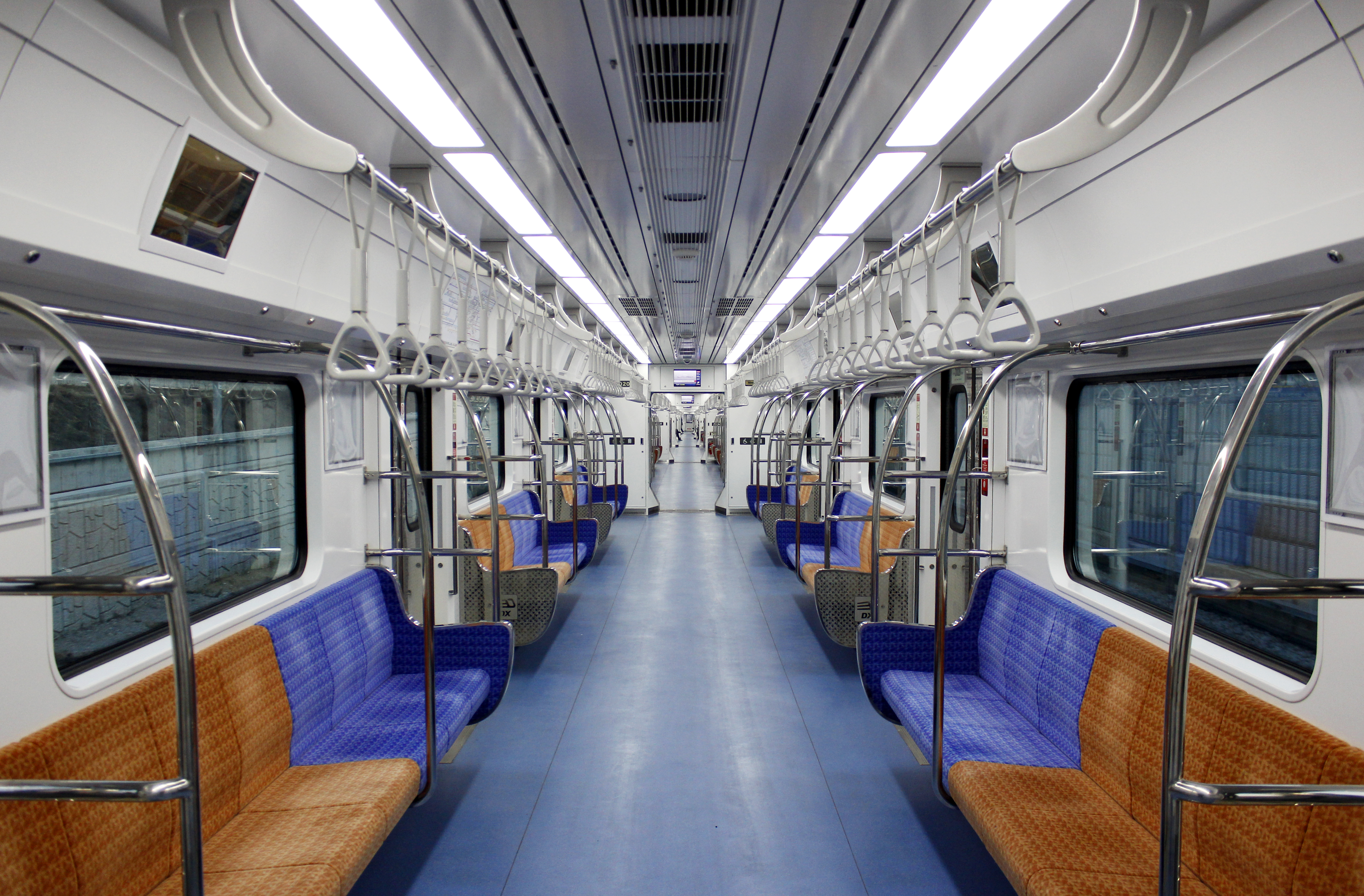
The interior of the 2011 introduced subway car built by Hyundai Rotem

Phase 1 alleviated some of the traffic from inner Seoul to Bundang which is mainly residential and within the Seoul Capital Area. Phase 1 was 17.3 km (10.7 mi) and intersects with several subway lines in south-eastern Seoul as well as with the Bundang Line. Travel from one end to the other was 16 minutes. Construction lasted for roughly six years starting in mid-2005 and ended at the end of October 2011. Total cost between public and private sectors was estimated at 1.169 trillion won.

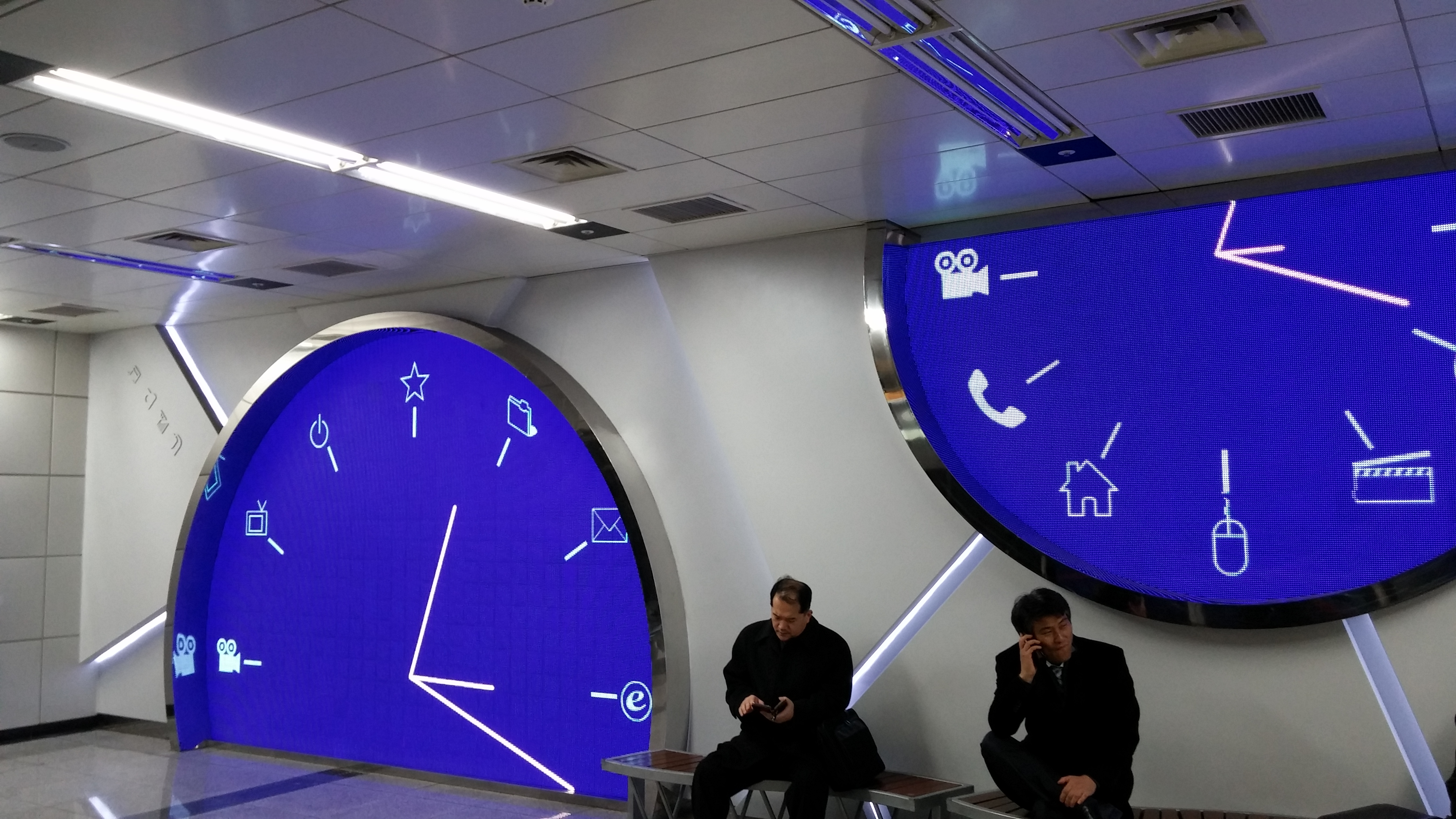
Platform of Gangnam station

Phase 2, a southern extension of the line, was primarily designed to ease heavy traffic between Yongin's Suji-gu and Bundang/Seoul, as Suji-gu was not a planned city like Bundang but abruptly and organically developed with large apartment complexes. As a result, Suji-gu is even more residential than Bundang, resulting in heavy traffic in connecting roads. The other aim was to connect the newly planned Gwanggyo New Town rapidly to Seoul. Because of the investors and owners of Phase 1 and 2 being different, a 300 won extra charge was added on top of the 900 won extra charge if riders crossed Jeongja station. Residents of Suji and Gwanggyo criticized the fare discrimination, despite a cashback being offered to frequent riders between Pangyo station and Dongcheon/Suji-gu Office Station (200 won for Dongcheon and 100 won for Suji-gu Office). The mayor of Yongin and Suwon, along with officials from Gyeonggi-do asked the Ministry of Land, Infrastructure and Transport to lower the fares, which announced that it is trying to cut the fare by using low interest rate loans but it would take at least a year for it to be finalized.

There was a debate between Seongnam City and Suwon City regarding whether Migeum should be included in the Phase 2 extension of Shinbundang Line. Supporters argued that the distance between Jeongja station and SB01, an originally planned station to follow Jeongja, would be unusually long at 3.76 km (2.34 mi). They also argued that the inclusion of Migeum will alleviate traffic in the area. Meanwhile, the Suwon opposition claims that the inclusion would delay travel time to Gwanggyo, a planned area of Suwon in construction.

Phase 3, a northern extension of the line, will extend the line northwest of Gangnam to Yongsan station. This additional stretch is estimated to cost at least 400 billion won. Because part of the line lies inside the Yongsan Garrison, the phase was split into two sections. One section, an extension from Gangnam to Sinsa, began construction in 2016 and was opened on May 28, 2022. The other section, a further extension from Sinsa to Yongsan, will start construction and will open no earlier than 2027.

Phase 4, a further extension of the line, will extend the line southwest to Suwon's Homaesil and Hwaseo station. It will be constructed in the 2020s and open no earlier than 2027.

An additional consideration is to push the line north beyond Yongsan Station and end around Gwanghwamun station and Gyeongbokgung station, making it easier for commuters to access Gangnam from the central business district of Seoul. It was unclear if this idea has been scrapped or pushed back for a later reevaluation but resurfaced as a March 2012 campaign promise by Hong Sa-duk to expand the line near Gyeongbokgung Station.

== Operation ==
From Gangnam station, trains are available from 05:30 until 24:50 on weekdays, cut to 23:48 on weekends and public holidays. However, the last train to Gwanggyo departs at 24:26 on weekdays, cut to 23:48 on weekends, with the remainder going until Jeongja station only.

The trains are automated and run every 5 minutes during peak times to 8 minutes during off-peak hours. The SBL Line signal system is based on state-of-the-art communications-based train control (CBTC) technology, utilizing two-way digital radio communications between intelligent trains, and wayside equipment, and a network of ATS/ATO computers designed for very high system reliability and availability. Platforms can accommodate 10-car trains at 200 m (656 ft 2 in) but initially 6-car trains will be used.

== Stations ==
=== Current line ===
Station; Number	Station name English	Station name Hangul	Transfer	Distance in km	Total; Distance	Location	
D04	Sinsa	신사	Seoul Subway Line 3	---	0.0	Seoul	Gangnam-gu
D05	Nonhyeon	논현	Seoul Subway Line 7	0.7	0.8	Seoul	Gangnam-gu
D06	Sinnonhyeon	신논현	Seoul Subway Line 9	0.8	1.6	Seoul	Gangnam-gu
D07	Gangnam	강남	Seoul Subway Line 2	0.9	2.4	Seoul	Gangnam-gu
D08	Yangjae (Seocho-gu Office)	양재 (서초구청)	Seoul Subway Line 3	1.5	3.9	Seoul	Seocho-gu
D09	Yangjae Citizen's Forest (Maeheon)	양재시민의숲 (매헌)		1.6	5.5	Seoul	Seocho-gu
D10	Cheonggyesan	청계산입구		2.9	8.4	Seoul	Seocho-gu
D11	Pangyo (Pangyo Techno Valley)	판교 (판교테크노밸리)	Gyeonggang Line	8.2	16.6	Gyeonggi-do	Seongnam City
D12	Jeongja	정자	Suin–Bundang Line	3.1	19.7	Gyeonggi-do	Seongnam City
D13	Migeum (Seoul National University Bundang Hospital)	미금 (분당서울대병원)	Suin–Bundang Line	1.9	21.6	Gyeonggi-do	Seongnam City
D14	Dongcheon	동천		1.6	23.2	Gyeonggi-do	Yongin City
D15	Suji-gu office	수지구청		2.1	25.3	Gyeonggi-do	Yongin City
D16	Seongbok	성복		1.7	27.0	Gyeonggi-do	Yongin City
D17	Sanghyeon	상현		2.1	29.1	Gyeonggi-do	Yongin City
D18	GwanggyoJungang (Ajou Univ.)	광교중앙 (아주대)	Underground bus transfer station	2.4	31.5	Gyeonggi-do	Suwon City
D19	Gwanggyo (Kyonggi Univ.)	광교 (경기대)		1.9	33.4	Gyeonggi-do	Suwon City

=== Yongsan extension and Samsong extension proposal ===
Although initially planned to be opened simultaneously with the Sinsa-Gangnam extension, due to the extension from Sinsa to Yongsan potentially sharing tracks with the newly approved GTX A line towards Ilsan, construction on this section has been delayed. The stations' locations will be determined when the Yongsan Garrison moves out and the freed space becomes a public park. Current call for the line to split at Dongbinggo to Noksapyeong station, Seoul station, City Hall station, Gwanghwamun station, Gyeongbokgung station, terminating at Samsong station in Goyang. However, the Yongsan extension will begin construction earlier than the Samsong extension, as the latter has not been evaluated yet.

Station; Number	Station name English	Station name Hangul	Transfer	Distance in km	Total; Distance	Location	
D01	Yongsan	용산	Honam Saemaeul-ho Mugunghwa-ho	-	0.0	Seoul	Yongsan-gu
D02	Yongsan Park	용산공원				Seoul	Yongsan-gu
D03	Dongbinggo	동빙고				Seoul	Yongsan-gu

=== Homaesil extension and Bongdam extension proposal ===
The southwestern extension to Homaesil passed the economic feasibility research in late 2019. It is expected that construction will begin in 2023, with opening potentially in 2027, given that construction usually take 5 years to complete. A further extension to Hwaseong City's Bongdam has been proposed but not evaluated yet.

Station; Number	Station name English	Station name Hangul	Station name Hanja	Transfer	Distance in km	Total; Distance	Location	
D20	Suwon World Cup Stadium	수원월드컵경기장	水原월드컵競技場				Gyeonggi-do	Suwon City
D21	Jangan	장안	長安				Gyeonggi-do	Suwon City
D22	Hwaseo	화서	華西	Seoul Subway Line 1			Gyeonggi-do	Suwon City
D23	Homaesil	호매실	好梅實				Gyeonggi-do	Suwon City

== See also ==
- Subways in South Korea
- Seoul Metropolitan Subway
