= Gwanggyo station =

Metro station in Suwon, South Korea

Coordinates: 37.3018957°N 127.0443287°E

D19 광교 (경기대) Gwanggyo (Kyonggi Univ.)
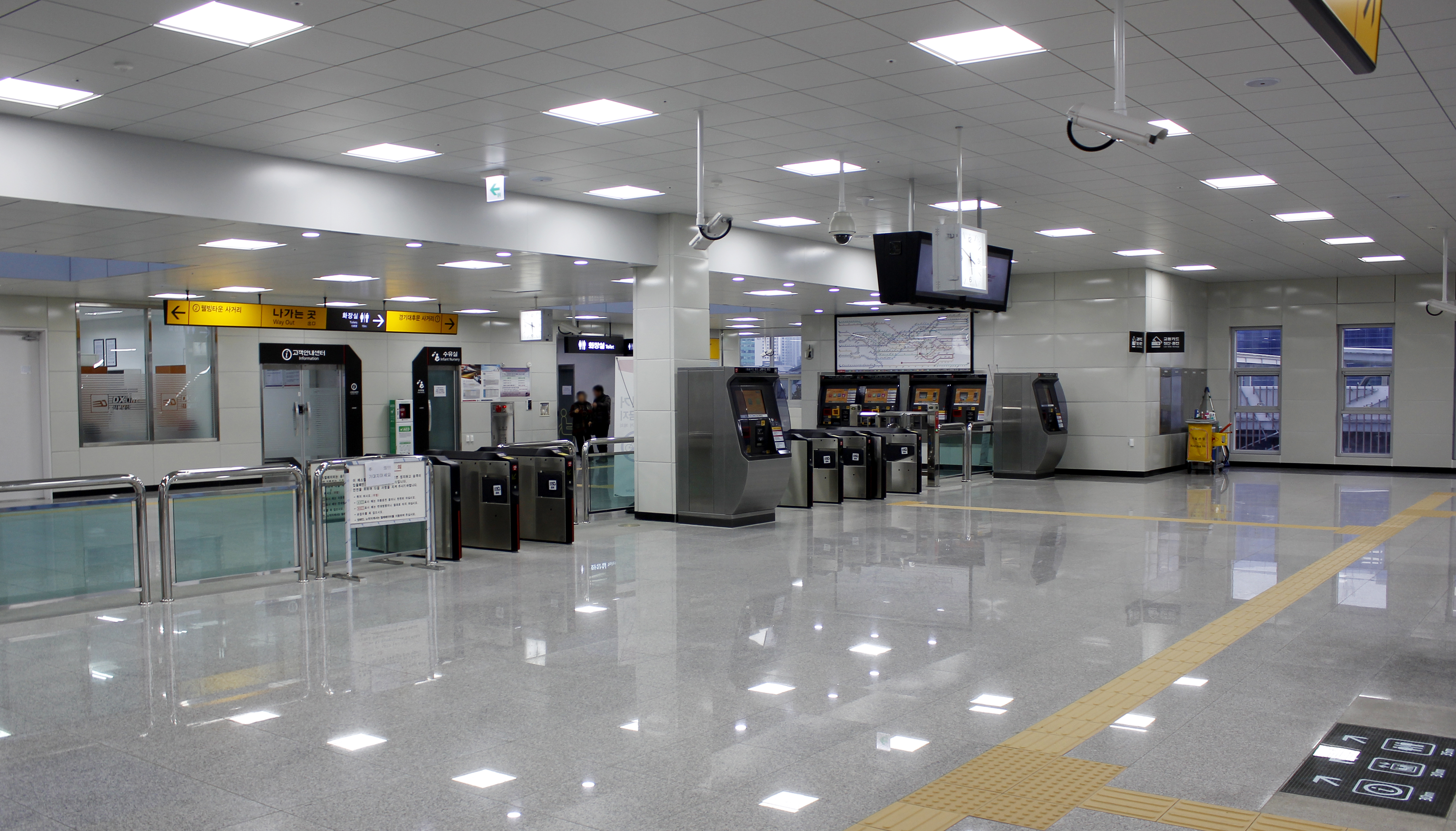
- Concourse

Korean name
- Hangul: 광교역
- Hanja: 光敎驛
- Revised Romanization: Gwanggyo yeok
- McCune–Reischauer: Kwangkyo yŏk

General information
- Location: 742 Iui-dong, Yeongtong-gu, Suwon, Gyeonggi-do
- Operator: Gyeonggi Railroad Co., Ltd.
- Line: Shinbundang Line
- Platforms: 2
- Tracks: 2

Construction
- Structure type: Aboveground

Key dates
- January 30, 2016: Shinbundang Line opened
Location

Gwanggyo (Kyonggi Univ.) Station is a metro station located in Gwanggyo, Yeongtong-gu, Suwon, Gyeonggi-do, South Korea. It is the only overground station in the line and built on the train depot.

The station is located directly in front of Kyonggi University and has many shops, restaurants and bars catering for university students around it.

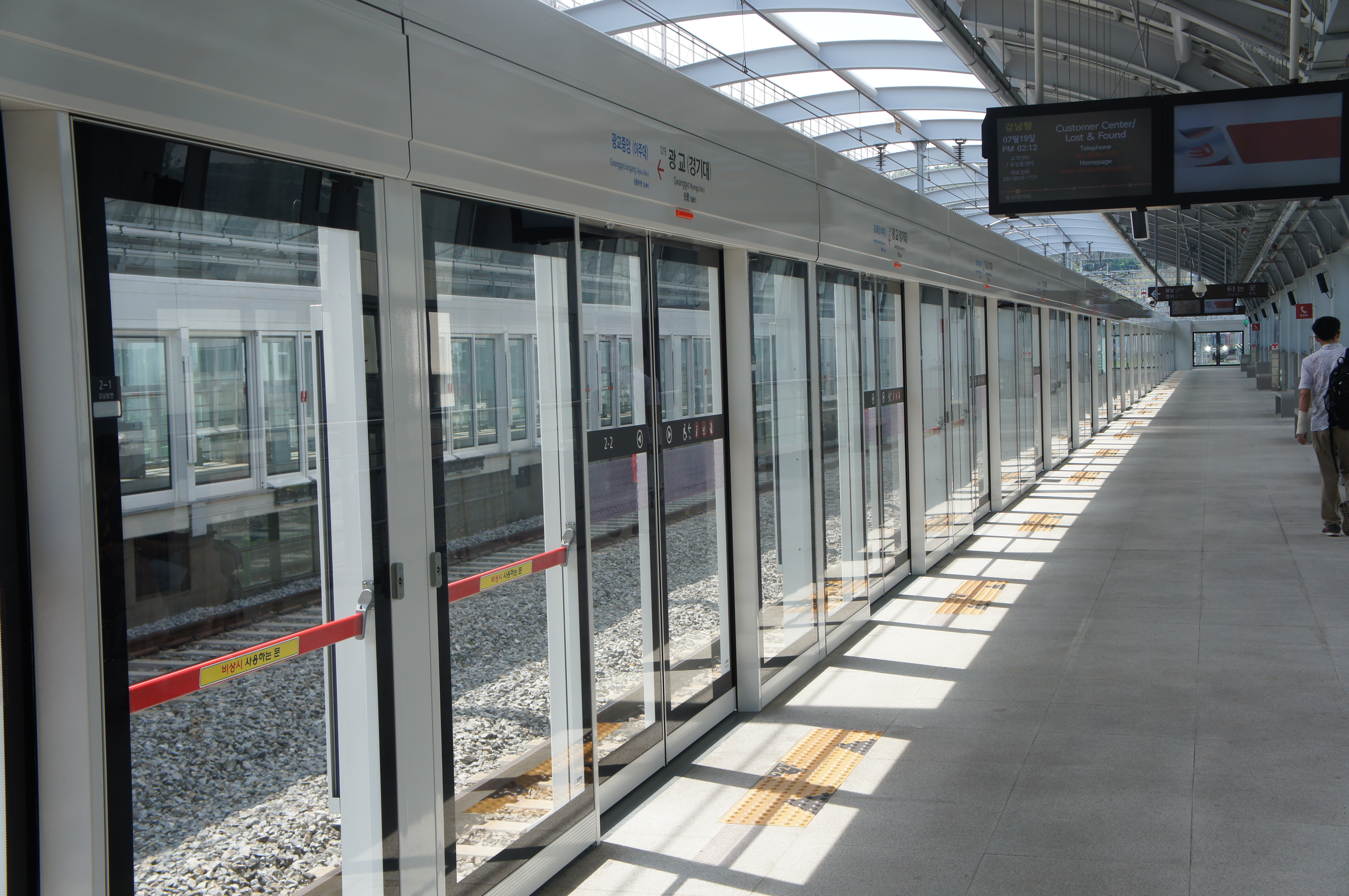
The platform of the station, the only above-ground of the line

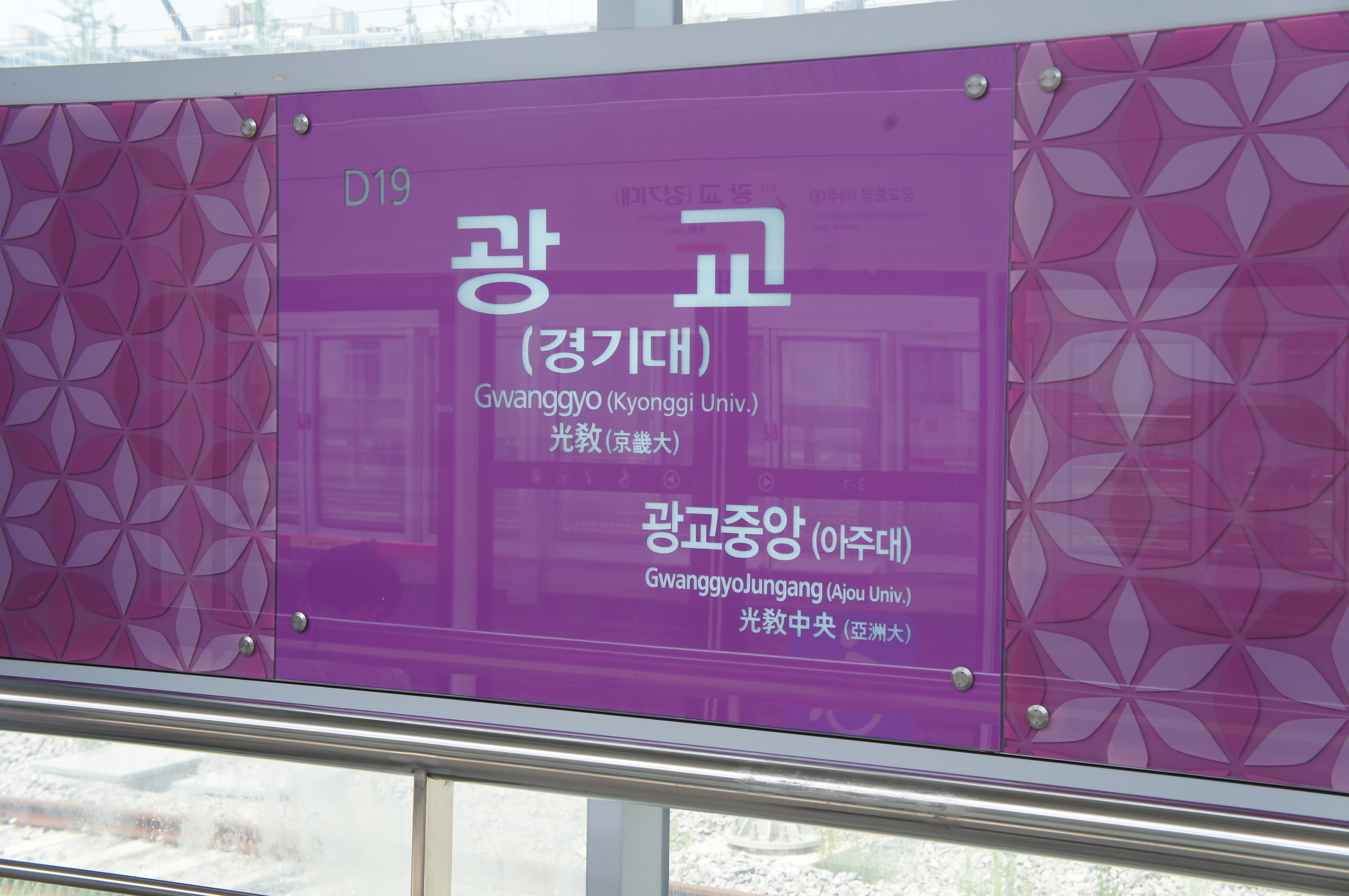
Station nameplate

== History ==
- September 4, 2015: Notice of commencement of service
- January 30, 2016: Opened as a terminal station with the extension of the Shinbundang Line from Jeongja Station to Gwanggyo Station (excluding Migeum Station)

== Around the station ==
- 신분당선 광교차량사업소
- 영동고속도로 동수원 나들목
- 경기대학교 수원캠퍼스
- 경기대학교 체육관 (대학배구리그 경기대학교 홈구장)
- 경기대학교 운동장 (대학축구리그 경기대학교 홈구장)
- 경기도남부경찰청
- 광교테크노밸리
- 수원광교박물관
- 수원역사박물관
- 이마트 광교점
- 광교홍재도서관
- 봉녕사
- 수원외국어고등학교

Preceding station	Seoul Metropolitan Subway	Following station
GwanggyoJungang towards Sinsa	Shinbundang Line	Terminus
