= Gwanggyo New Town =

- Hangul: 광교신도시
- Hanja: 光敎新都市
- RR: Gwanggyo sindosi
- MR: Kwanggyo sindosi

Gwanggyo New Town refers to a planned city surrounding Yeongtong District of Suwon and Suji District (or Giheung District) of Yongin. Located about 25 km south of Seoul, Gwanggyo New Town has an area 11 square kilometers and was designated as such in 2004 by Gyeonggi Province, the city governments of Suwon and Yongin, and Gyeonggi Development Corp. (GICO). It will accommodate more than 31,000 households. In addition to increasing housing supply, Gwanggyo New Town also aims to achieve several other regional goals such as relocation of the provincial office, a new convention center, and creating a core for economic growth in Gyeonggi province. Its infrastructure was scheduled to be constructed by 2012.
