= Sinsa station =

Station of the Seoul Metropolitan Subway

신사 (KCC건설); Sinsa (KCC E&C)
D04
신사
Sinsa
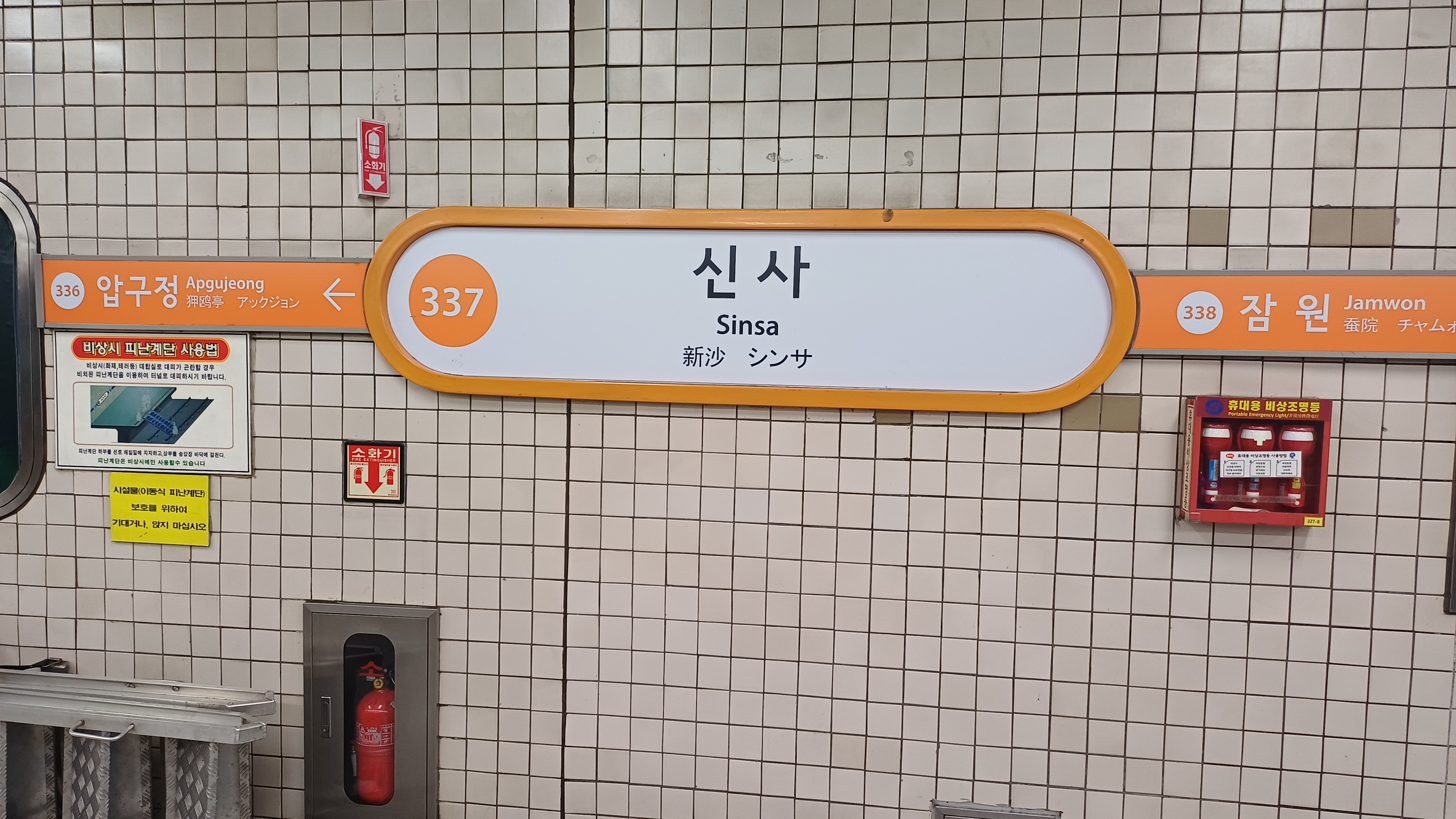
- The Line 3 station nameplate of Sinsa station in 2025

Korean name
- Hangul: 신사역
- Hanja: 新沙驛
- RR: Sinsa-yeok
- MR: Sinsa-yŏk

General information
- Location: 667 Sinsa-dong, 102 Dosandaero Jiha, Gangnam-gu, Seoul
- Coordinates: 37°30′46″N 127°00′40″E
- Operator: Seoul Metro; New Seoul Railroad Co., Ltd.
- Lines: Line 3 Shinbundang Line
- Platforms: 4
- Tracks: 4

Construction
- Structure type: Underground

Key dates
- October 18, 1985: Line 3 opened
- May 28, 2022: Shinbundang Line opened

Passengers
- (Daily) Based on Jan-Dec of 2012. Line 3: 63,679

Services
Preceding station	Seoul Metropolitan Subway	Following station
Apgujeong towards Daehwa	Line 3	Jamwon towards Ogeum
Terminus	Shinbundang Line	Nonhyeon towards Gwanggyo
Location

Sinsa station is a station on the Seoul Subway Line 3 and the Shinbundang Line. It is located in Sinsa-dong, Gangnam-gu and Jamwon-dong, Seocho-gu, Seoul. It will serve as the northern terminus of the Wirye–Sinsa Line when it is opened in 2025.

== Surrounding ==
There are national pension management corporations such as Gangnam branch office, Sinsa-dong resident center, Apgujeong district, Yeongdong market, Hadong park, Korea Basketball Federation, and Hannam Grand Bridge.

== Station layout ==
G	Street level	Exit

L1; Concourse	Lobby	Customer Service, Shops, Vending machines, ATMs

L2; Platform	Side platform, doors will open on the right
L2; Platform	Northbound	← Line 3 toward Daehwa (Apgujeong)
L2; Platform	Southbound	Line 3 toward Ogeum (Jamwon) →
L2; Platform	Side platform, doors will open on the right

== Ridership ==
Station	Passengers						
Station	2000	2001	2002	2003	2004	2005	2006
Line 3	27282	24564	24853	24136	24237	23797	23794

== Gallery ==
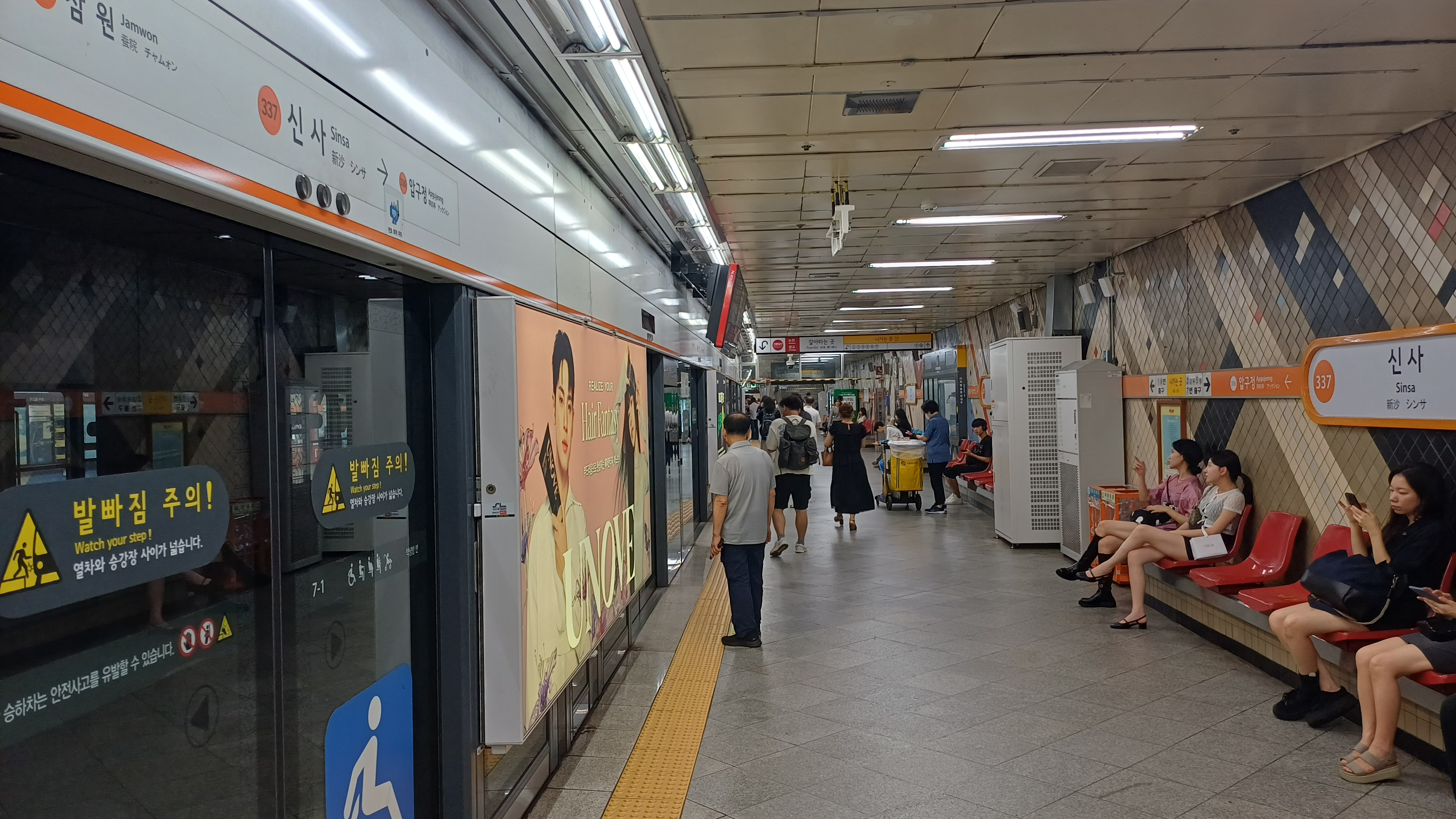
Line 3 platform

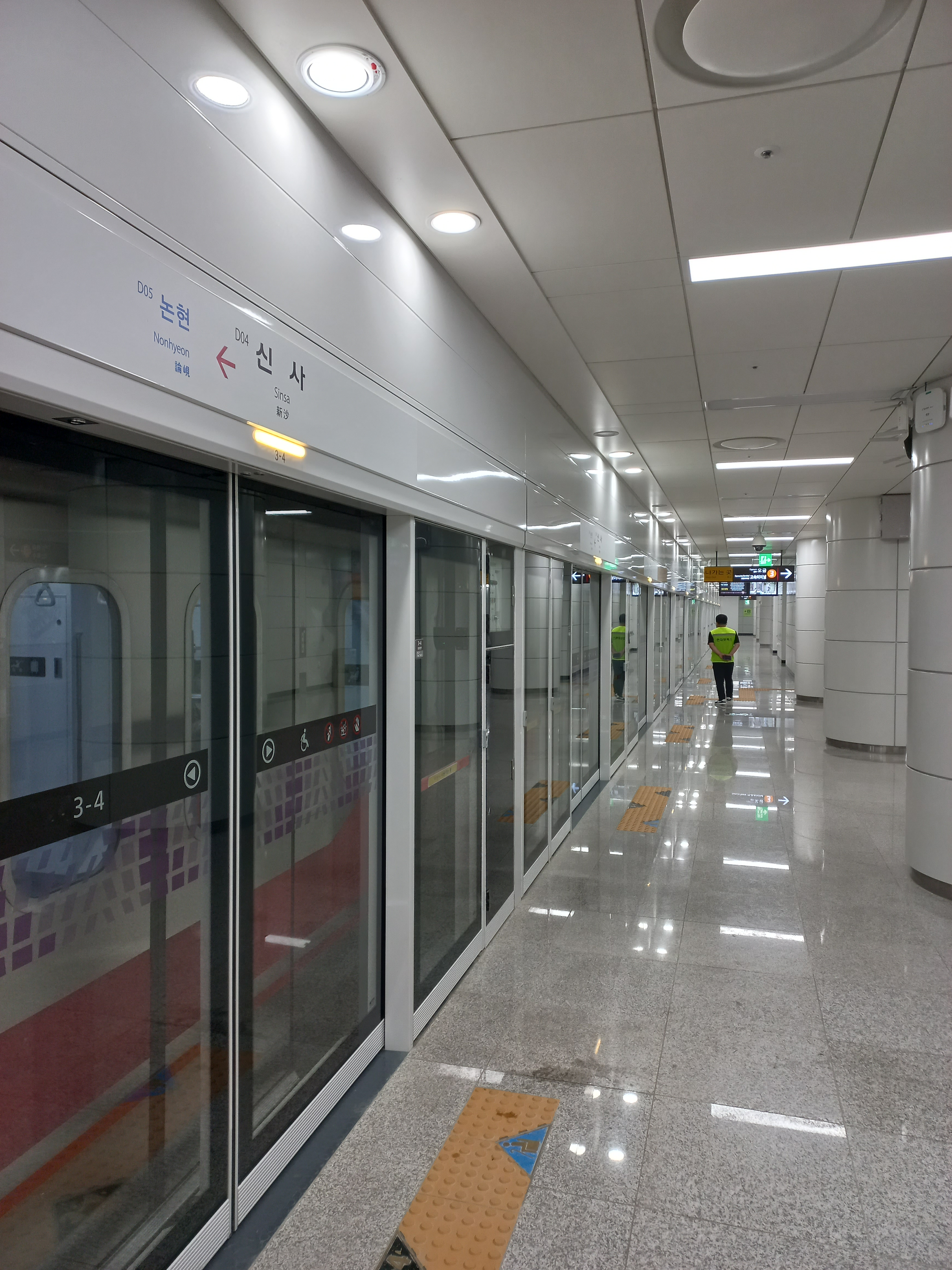
Shinbundang Line platform

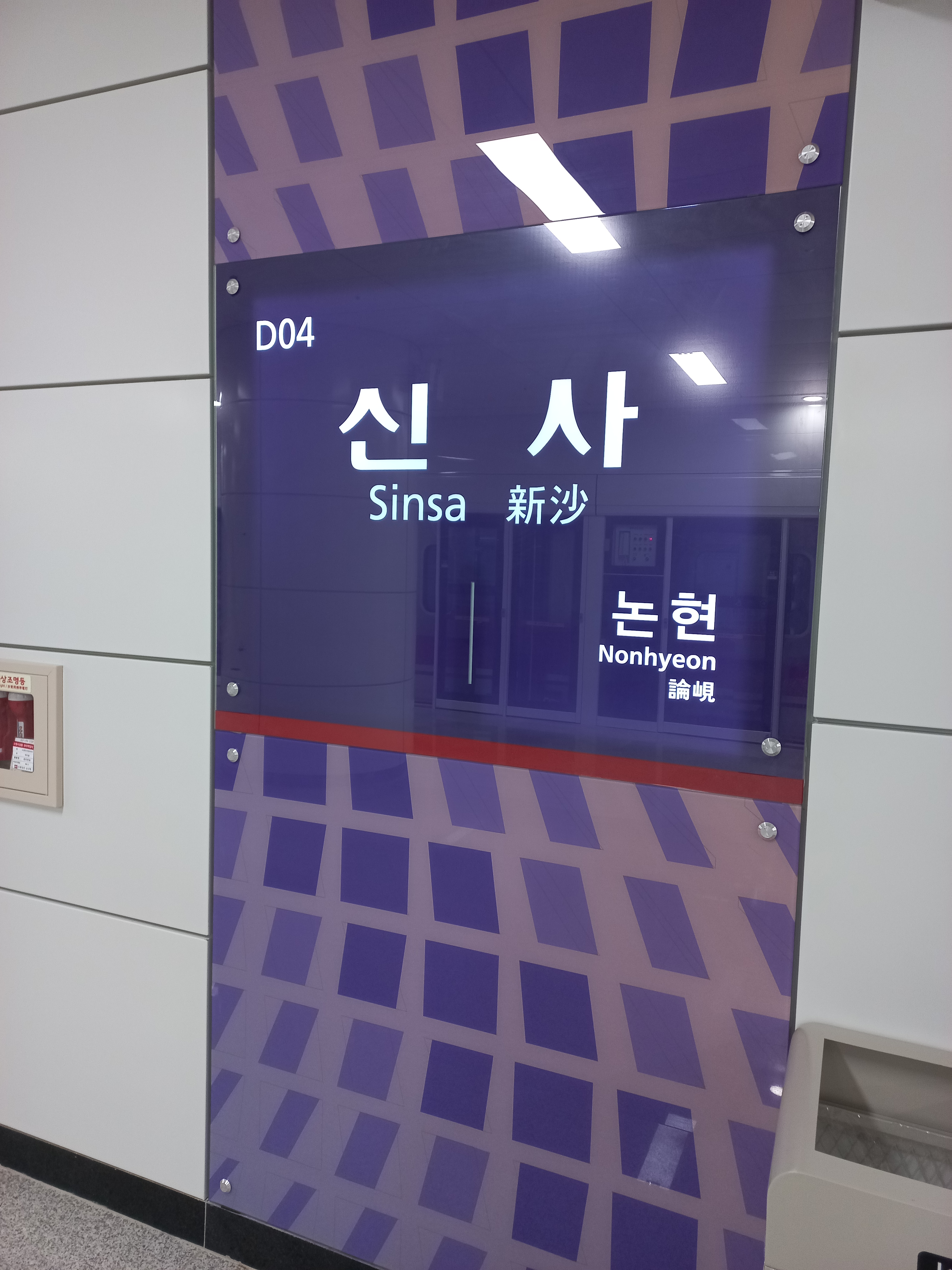
Shinbundang Line station nameplate
