= Korail Class 351000 =

South Korean train

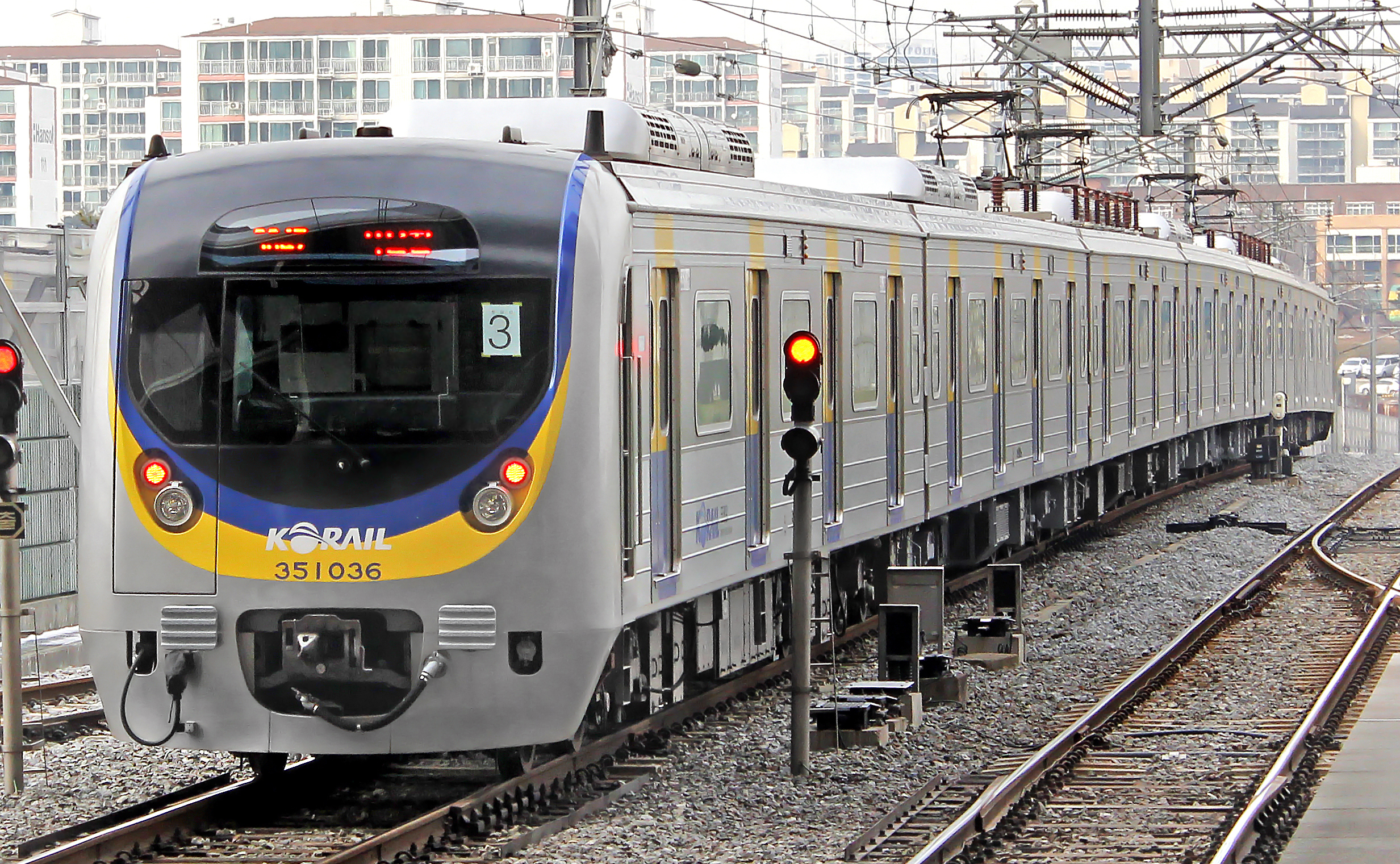
- A Korail Class 351000 (3rd generation) train on the Suin-Bundang Line at Jukjeon
- In service: 1993-present
- Manufacturers: Hyundai Rotem (formerly Daewoo Heavy Industries, Hyundai Precision & Industries, Hanjin Heavy Industries, and Rotem)
- Constructed: 1st generation: 1993, 1996, 1999; 2nd generation: 2003; 3rd generation: 2011-2014, 2017; 4th generation: 2021-2022
- Refurbished: 2003-2005 (1st & 2nd generation)
- Number built: 474: 1st generation: 132; 2nd generation: 36; 3rd generation: 198; 4th generation: 108
- Number in service: 1st generation: 0; 2nd generation: 36; 3rd generation: 198; 4th generation: 108
- Number scrapped: 132
- Formation: 6 cars per train TC-M-M'-T-M'-TC
- Fleet numbers: 351x01~351x43(Bundang), 351x61~351x78(Suin)
- Operator: Korail
- Depots: Bundang; Siheung
- Line served: Suin-Bundang Line (수인분당선)

Specifications
- Car body construction: Steel
- Car length: 19.6 m (64 ft 4 in)
- Width: 3.12 m (10 ft 3 in)
- Height: 3.8 m (12 ft 6 in)
- Doors: 4 per side, 8 per car
- Maximum speed: 110 km/h (68 mph) (under ATS); 110 km/h (68 mph) (under ATC)
- Traction system: GTO-VVVF and IGBT-VVVF (Toshiba)
- Traction motors: 200 kW (268 hp) 3-phase AC induction motor (Toshiba)
- Power output: 4,400 kW (5,900 hp)
- Acceleration: 3.0 km/(h⋅s) (1.9 mph/s)
- Deceleration: 3.5 km/(h⋅s) (2.2 mph/s) (service); 4.5 km/(h⋅s) (2.8 mph/s) (emergency)
- Electric systems: 25 kV 60 Hz AC and 1,500 V DC, both from overhead catenary
- Current collection: Pantograph
- Safety systems: ATS, ATC
- Coupling system: Shibata-type
- Track gauge: 1,435 mm (4 ft 8 1/2 in)

The Korail Class 351000 trains, formerly identified as Korail Class 2000 trains, are commuter electric multiple units in South Korea used on Suin-Bundang Line. Class 351000 trains were manufactured and delivered between 1993.

== Technical details ==
=== Formation ===
The Class 351000 cars are arranged in 6-car trains. Details of the car types of each train are listed below:

3510XX (ex-20XX) - Tc (trailer driving car with SIV, air compressor, and battery)
3511XX (ex-22XX) - M (motor car with inverter and controller)
3512XX (ex-23XX) - M' (motor car with pantograph, transformer, inverter, and controller)
3513XX (ex-24XX) - T (trailer car)
3514XX (ex-25XX) - M'
3519XX (ex-21XX) - Tc

=== Electrical parts ===
Trains 351x09, 351x11~351x12, 351x14, 351x17~351x18, and 351x20~351x28 use Toshiba GTO-based VVVF controls with active cooling, while all other trains use IGBT controls with passive cooling through a heat pipe. The trains are equipped with regenerative braking, reducing energy consumption and simplifying train inspection. The trains feature a more powerful air conditioning system than that on the Class 1000 trains.

=== Interior design ===
The 1st and 2nd generation Class 351000 trains used an ivory-colored interior with a long sheet prior to their overhauls. All 1st and 2nd generation trains, as well as subsequent generation, use a white interior. LED display monitors are installed on the top of each car. The end cars have a space for wheelchairs.

=== Cabin ===
The Class 351000 trains equipped with TGIS use color displays, and service machines can be automatically controlled in TGIS after a refurbishment of these trains in 2005. Dead section notifiers are also installed.

== Depot ==
Most of the Class 351000 trains are stored at the Bundang Depot, which is located between Jukjeon Station and Bojeong Station. The remaining other Class 351000 trains are stored at the Siheung Depot, which is located between Oido Station and Darwol Station.

== Generations ==
=== 1st generation ===
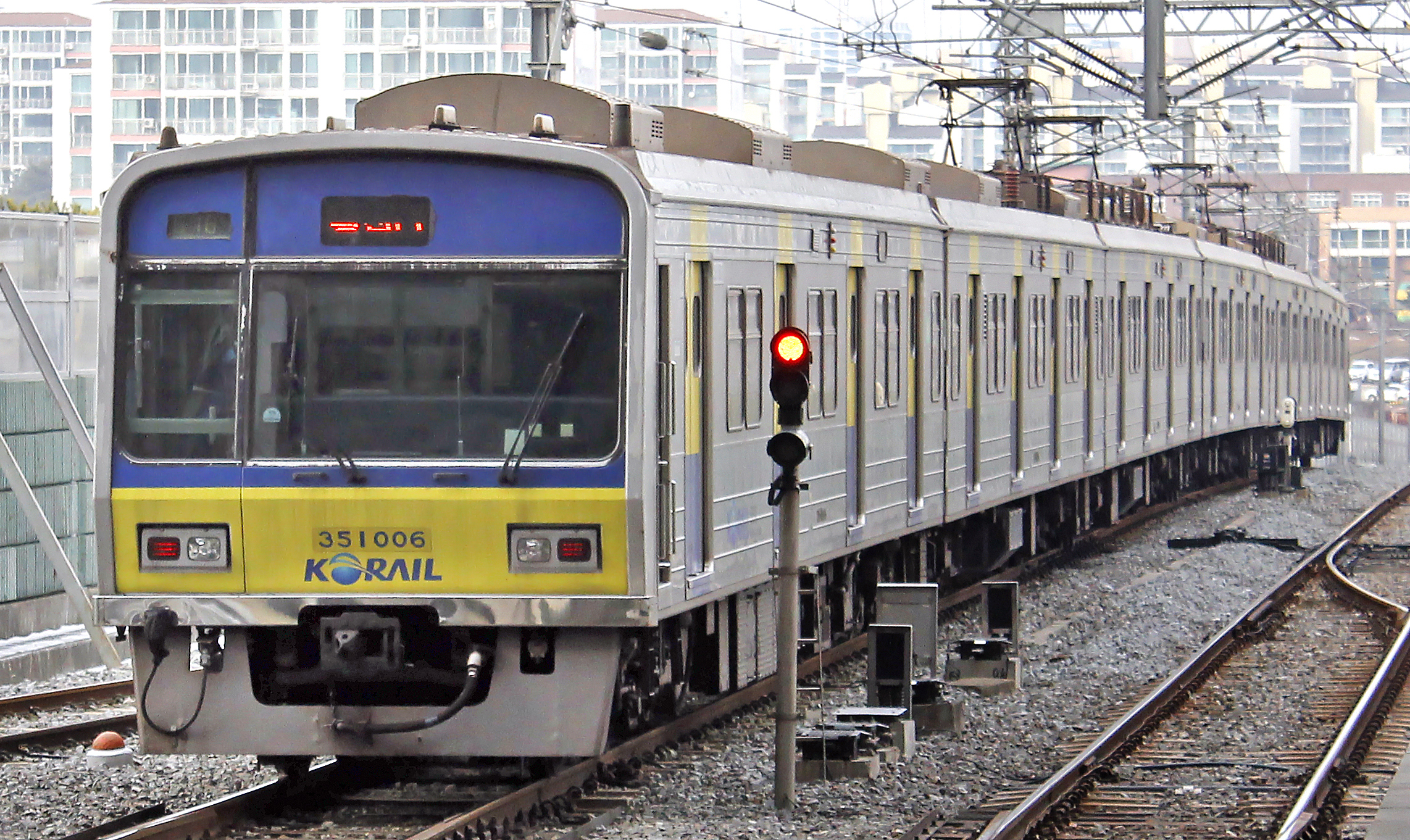
Class 351000 (1st generation) train 351-06 (ex-Class 2030 train 2-57)

The first generation of Class 351000 trains were built from 1993 to 1999 by Daewoo Heavy Industries and Hanjin Heavy Industries. Because of the flat front ends, the trains are nicknamed "flat face" (납작이).

The trains are numbered 351x01~351x22; the trains were renumbered from trains 2x47~2x48, 2x50, 2x55~2-69, and 2x73~2x76.

Trains 351x01~351x18 were manufactured from 1993 to 1995 by Daewoo Heavy Industries and Hanjin Heavy Industries to address the opening of the Bundang Line from Suseo station to Ori station. Trains 351-19~351-22 were manufactured in 1999 by Hanjin Heavy Industries to expand the rolling stock on Bundang Line.

Trains 351x01~351x18 were fully retired by July 2023. They were replaced by 4th generation trains manufactured by Hyundai Rotem. Trains 351x19~351x22 were fully retired by June 2024, being replaced by new Hyundai Rotem trains.

=== 2nd generation ===
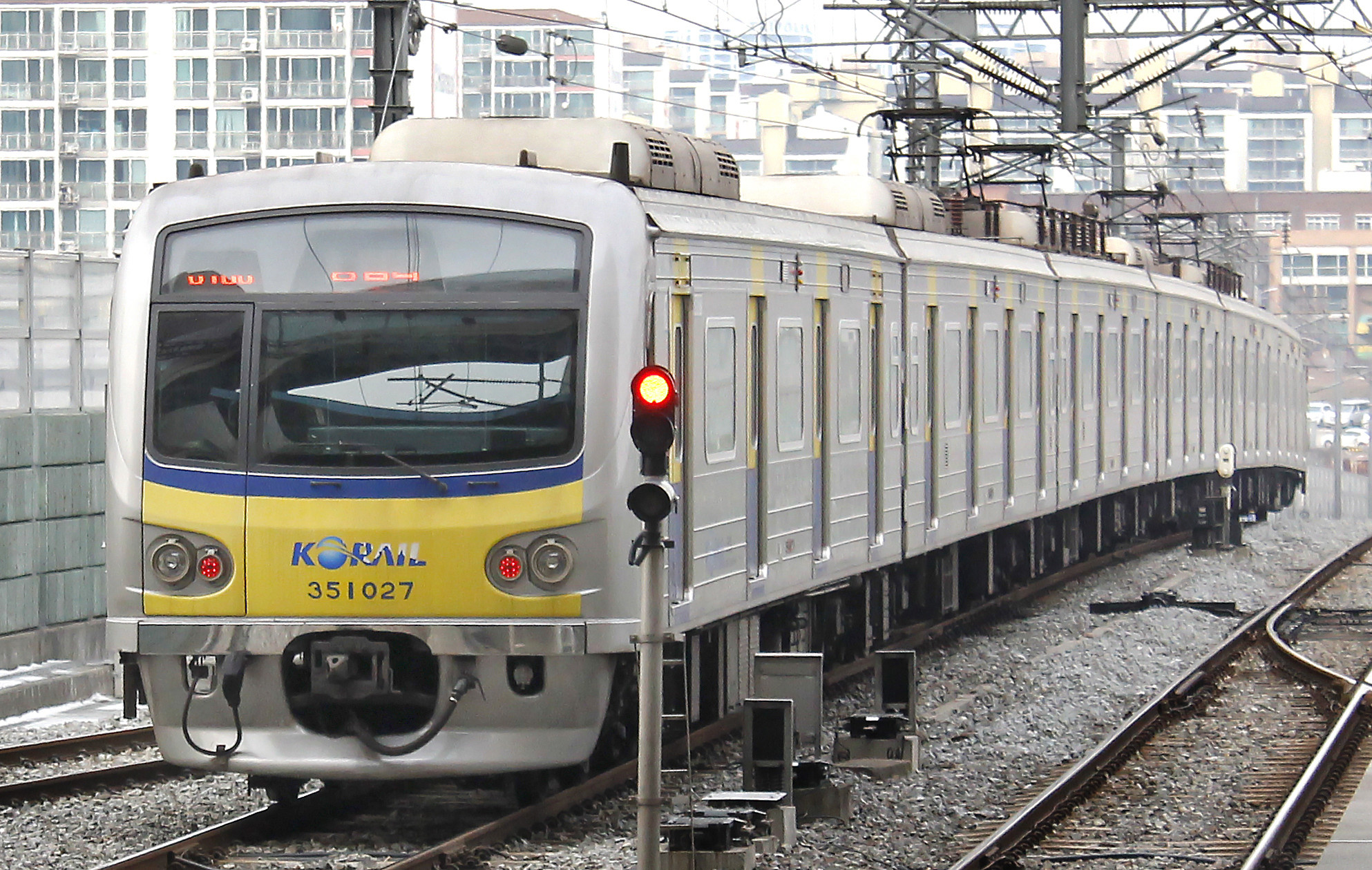
Class 351000 (2nd generation) train 351x27 (ex-Class 2030 train 2x86)

The second generation of Class 351000 trains were built in 2003 by KOROS to address the extension of the Suin-Bundang Line from Suseo station to Seolleung station. The car body as a whole was redesigned; the cab ends of the driving cars were changed completely, and the side windows are now coated and in a single piece (as opposed to the two-window setup between doors). Because of the circular front view, the trains are nicknamed "round face" (동글이).

The trains are numbered 351-23~351-28.

=== 3rd generation ===
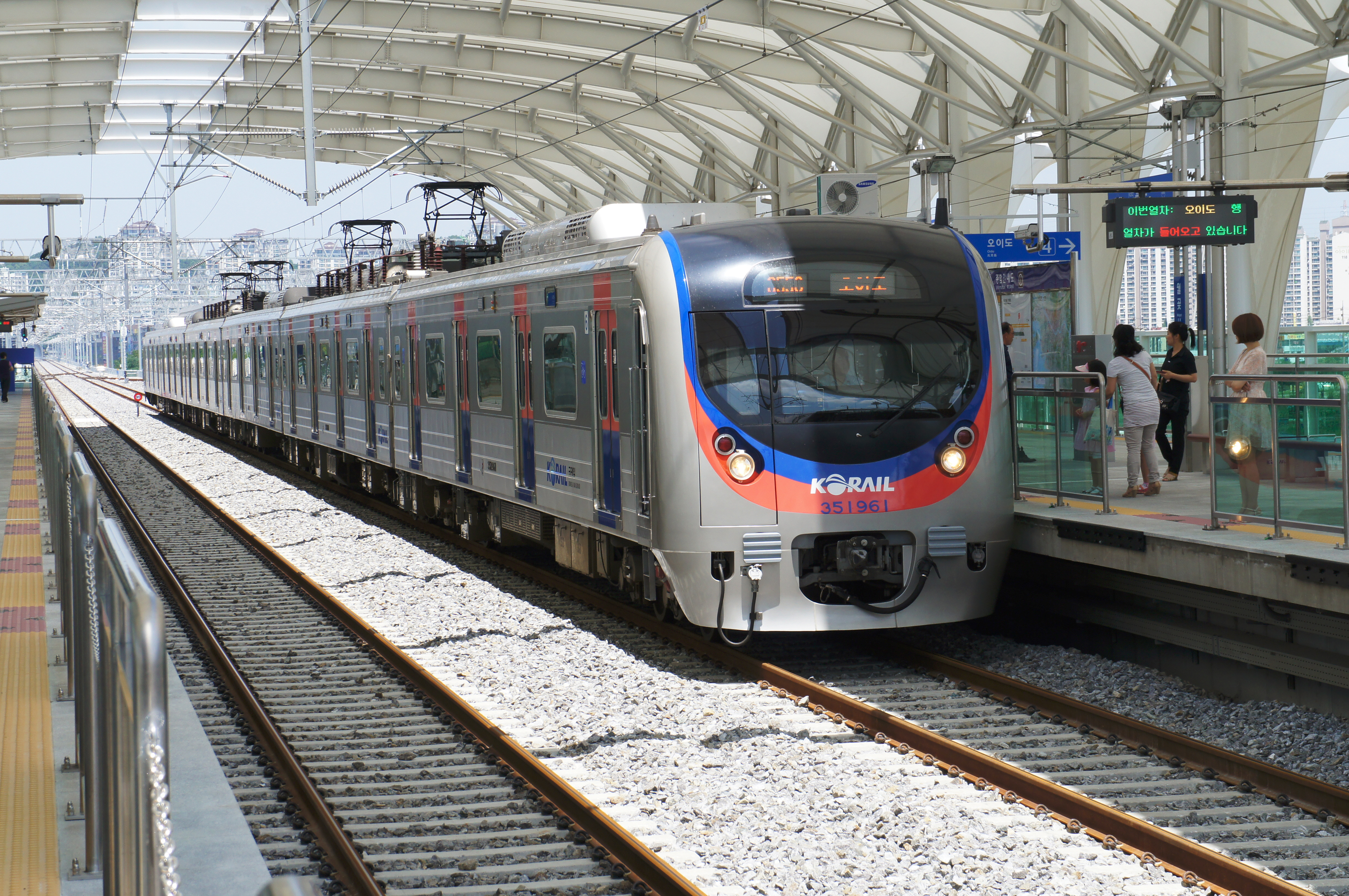
Class 351000 (3rd generation) train 351x61 on the Suin-Bundang Line, prior to its repaint

The third generation Class 351000 trains were built from 2011 to 2017 by Hyundai Rotem to address numerous extensions of the Suin-Bundang Line. The front ends have been updated once again, and the trains feature snake-like headlights, giving the trains the nickname "뱀눈이" (roughly translated as "snake eyes"). The interior was also updated, and the door motors are now electric-powered as opposed to air-powered. The third generation trains operating on the Suin-Bundang Line are numbered 351x29~351x43, and 351x61~351x78.

Trains 351x29~351x33 and 351x61~351x68 were manufactured in 2011 to address the extension of the Suin-Bundang Line from Bojeong station to Giheung station. Because the new rebuilt Suin-Bundang Line had not yet opened before the trains were delivered, trains 351-61~351-64 provided additional service on the former Jungang Line when existing trains on the line were suddenly reduced from eight cars to six cars.

Trains 351x34~351x40 were originally manufactured in 2012 to address the extension of the Suin-Bundang Line from Giheung station to Mangpo station. These trains originally used two converted Class 321000 cars per train, but when the Class 321000 trains were re-extended to eight cars per train, the trains were taken out of service until two new cars were created per train in 2014.

Trains 351x41~351x43 and 351x69~351x72 were manufactured in 2013 to address the extension of the Suin-Bundang Line from Mangpo station to Suwon station. They were among the first cars to be delivered with LED headlights.

Trains 351x73~351x78 were manufactured in 2017 to address the final extension of the Suin-Bundang Line, which linked the Bundang Line with the Suin Line. The front ends have been updated once again, and the trains feature updates such as single-arm pantographs (similar to those used on ITX-Saemaeul trains and KTX trains), CCTV cameras, and a third headlight in the same compartment as the destination sign and the run number indicator, giving the trains the nickname "삼눈이" (roughly translated as "3 eyes").

=== 4th generation ===
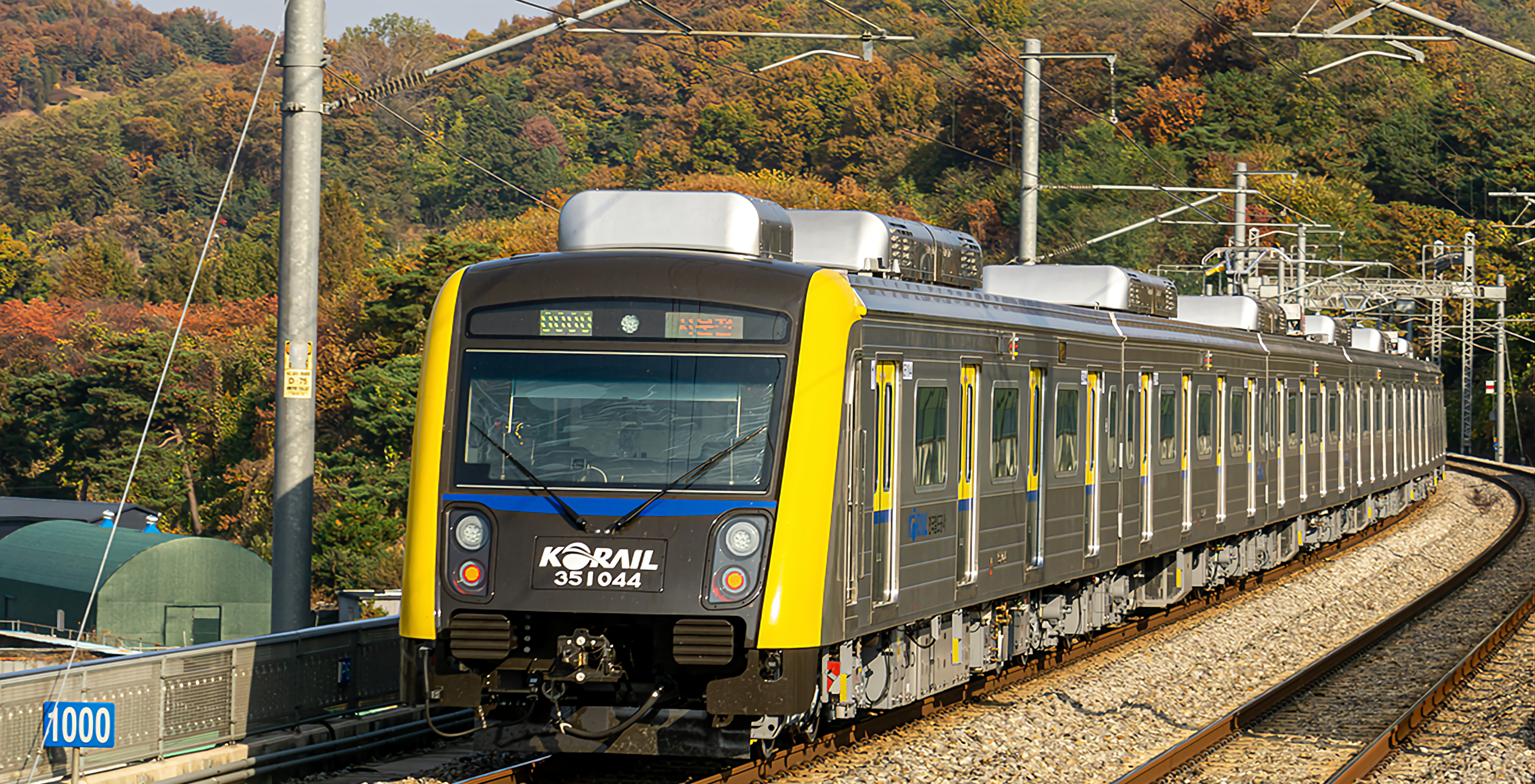
Class 351000 (4th generation) train 351x44

The fourth generation of Class 351000 trains were built by Hyundai Rotem from 2021 to 2022, to replace the aging first generation trains that were nearing the end of their service lifespans. The trains have a drastic change compared to the previous generations, such as the change in the propulsion system and a significant change in the design of the end cabs; because of the snout-like appearance, railfans nicknamed the trains "주둥이" (roughly translated as "snout face"). The trains will be delivered in an updated version of the current livery. The new trains also have a change in the interior design.

At this time, 18 sets, numbered 351x44~351x60 and 351x79, were delivered between fall 2021 and winter 2022, and entered service from summer 2022 to summer 2023. These sets serve as replacements for aging first generation Class 351000 trains.

== Refurbishment ==
The first and second generation Class 351000 trains were overhauled from 2003 to 2005 (though minor refurbishments were started in 2002). Major and minor refurbishments are listed below.

=== Overhaul ===
The Daegu subway fire compelled Korail to introduce flame-resistant interiors for passenger safety. As a result, all first and second generation trains were overhauled with fire-retardant interiors from 2003 to 2005. All third and fourth generation trains were delivered to be fire-retardant from the beginning.

=== New livery ===
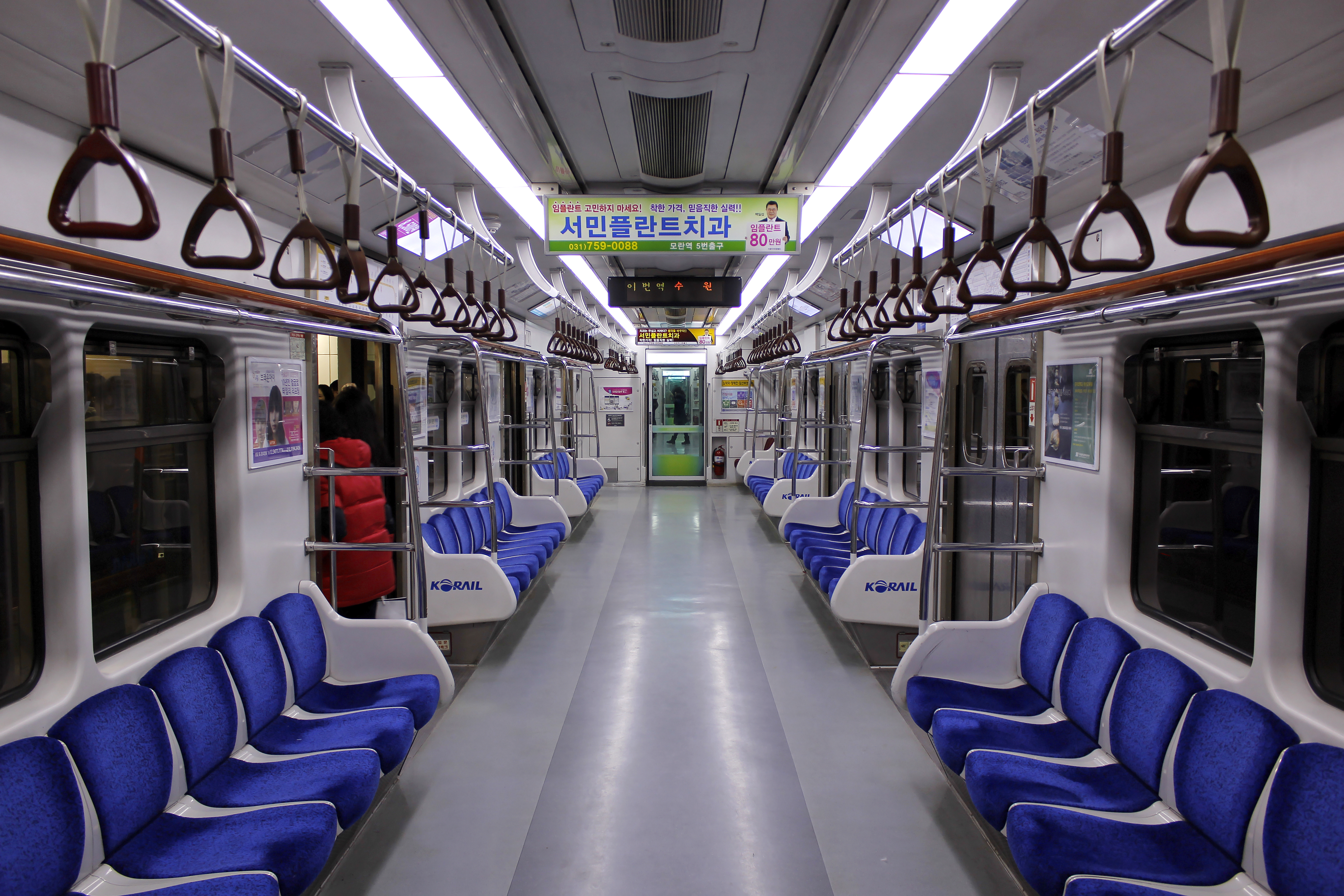
Refurbished interior of a first batch train

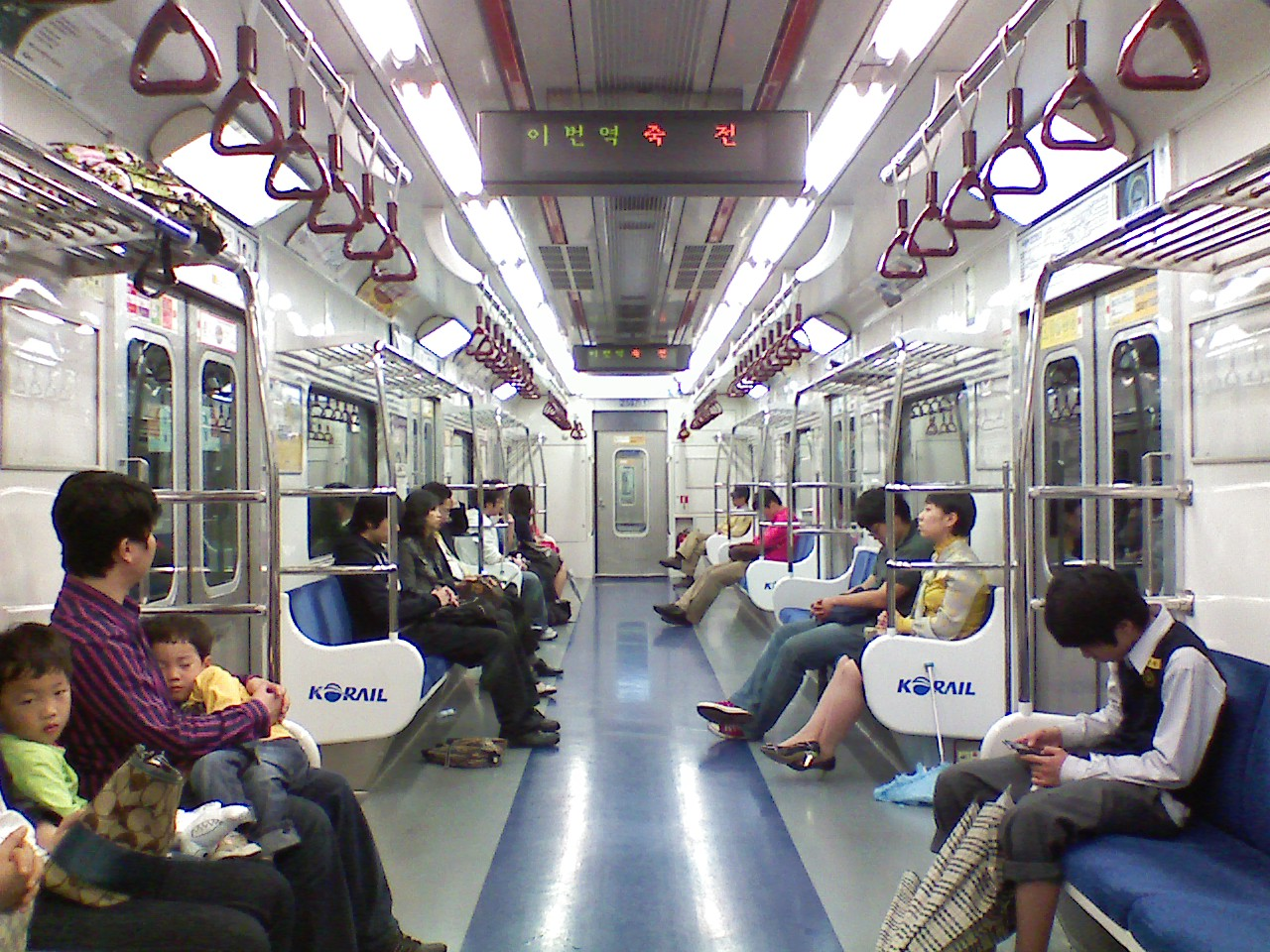
Refurbished interior of a second batch train

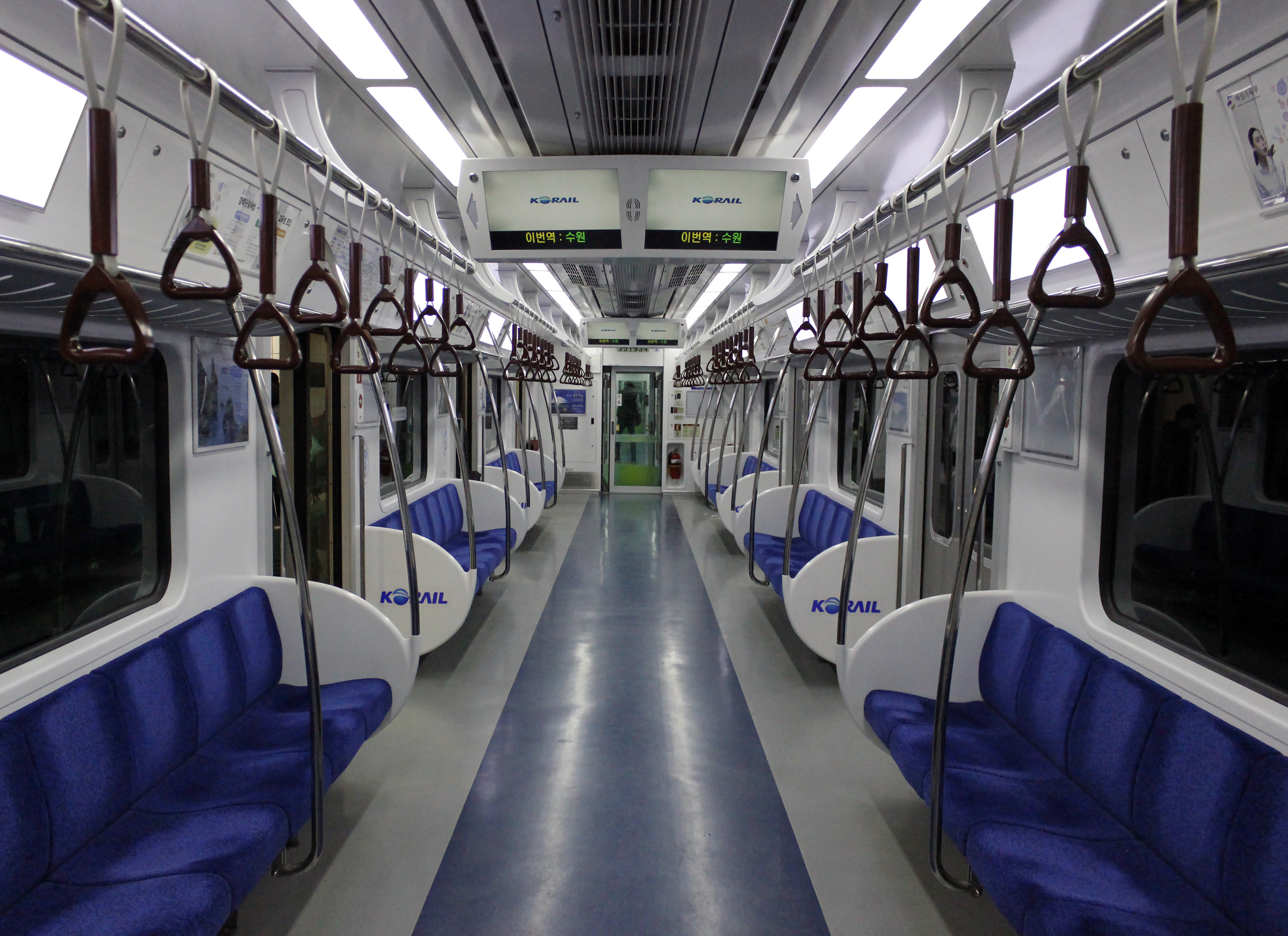
Interior of a third batch train

All first and second generation trains featured a livery consisting of red and orange stripes. These trains were repainted into a two-tone blue and yellow livery from 2003 to 2005. The new livery has a metaphor of Taegeuk, but was criticized as being too primitive-looking. The livery is applied only on the front and on the doors.

Until 2017, trains 351x61~351x72 used a two-tone red and blue livery, the same livery used on Line 1 and Gyeongui-Jungang Line trains.

=== Electric parts ===
- 2002: Trains 351x01~351x22 were retrofitted with Comonet broadcasting systems. They have since been removed.
- 2003: All 1st generation trains except trains 351x09, 351x11~351x12, 351x14, 351x17~351x18, and 351x20~351x22 had their GTO inverters replaced with IGBT inverters.
- 2004: All trains' braking systems are refurbished to generate less noise.
- 2004-2005: SIV traction systems were replaced with IGBT traction systems built by Woojin Industrial Systems.
- 2005: Various new components in all trains (public address systems, newer cooling systems, and LED destination signs) were added.

From July 2008, all 1st and 2nd generation trains were retrofitted with automatic gangway doors (similar retrofits were also done in Class 311000, Class 321000, and Class 341000 trains). This retrofit included the installation of automatic doors to replace the older doors that were manually pulled open; gangway doors can now be automatically opened by the push of a button. This retrofit process was completed by February 2012.

All trains that were delivered with incandescent headlights are now being retrofitted with LED headlights, following the successful testing of LED headlights on the Korail Class 311000 cars.

=== Renumbering ===
In 2011, the 1st and 2nd generation Class 351000 trains were renumbered from the 2030-series to the 351000-series as a part of a new numbering scheme by Korail (the leading "3" indicating a metro car). Renumbering was finished by mid-2011.

== See also ==
- Korail
- Bundang Line
- Suin Line
- Korail Class 311000
- Korail Class 341000
