= Ori station =

Metro station in Seongnam, South Korea

오리; Ori
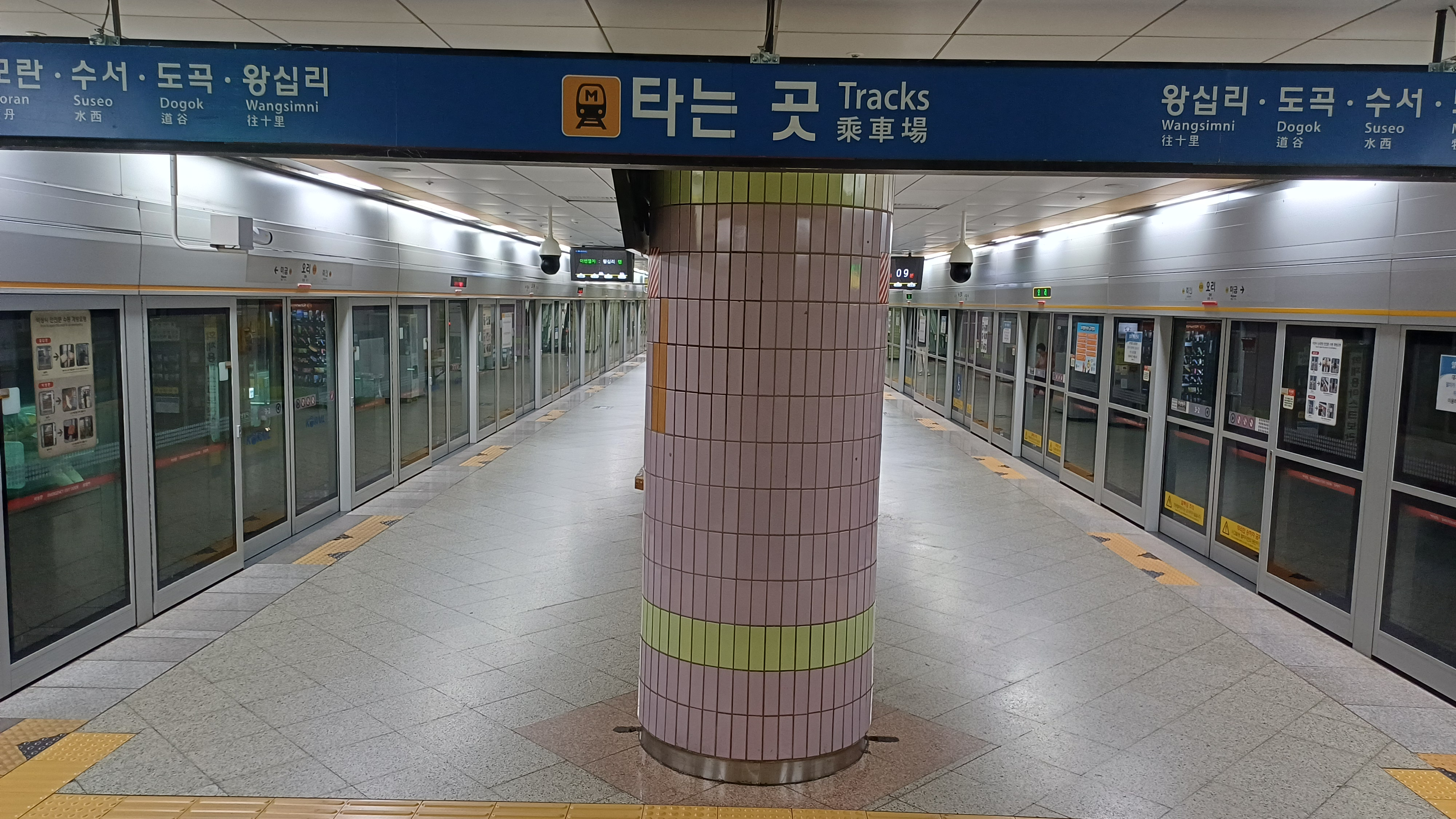
- Station platform

Korean name
- Hangul: 오리역
- Hanja: 梧里驛
- Revised Romanization: Ori-yeok
- McCune–Reischauer: Ori-yŏk

General information
- Location: 795 Gumi-dong, Bundang-gu, Seongnam-si, Gyeonggi-do
- Coordinates: 37°20′23.19″N 127°6′32.19″E
- Operator: Korail
- Line: Suin–Bundang Line
- Platforms: 2
- Tracks: 4

Construction
- Structure type: Underground

Key dates
- September 1, 1994: Suin–Bundang Line opened
Location

Ori Station is a subway station on the Suin–Bundang Line. Prior to the opening of Bojeong Station in 2004, it was the southern terminus of the Bundang Line. It is the first underground railway station built in Korea to have two island platforms and four rail tracks.

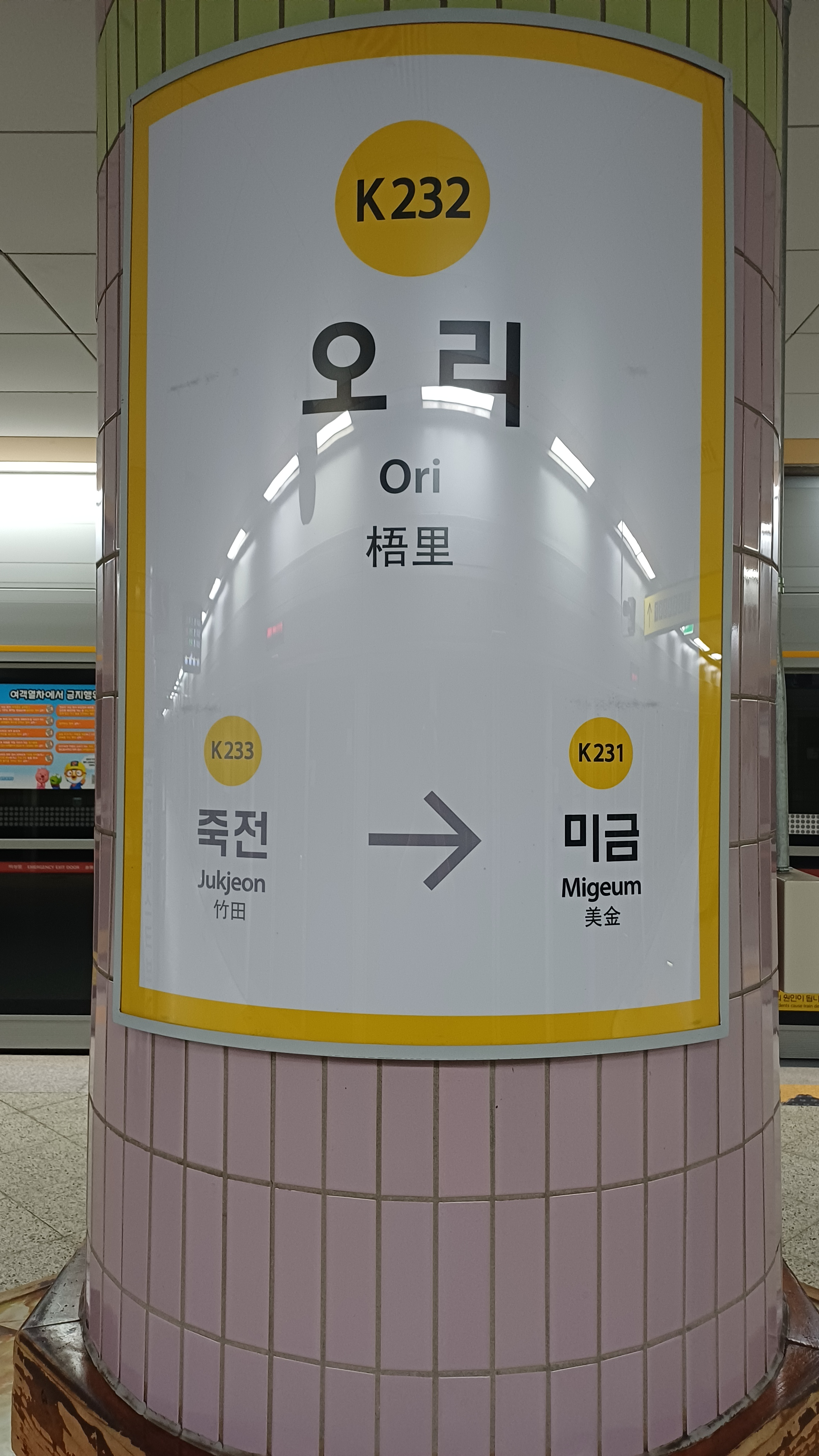
Station nameplate

Preceding station	Seoul Metropolitan Subway	Following station
Migeum towards Cheongnyangni	Suin–Bundang Line	Jukjeon towards Incheon
