= Hagik station =

Metro station in Incheon, South Korea

Coordinates: 37°26′16″N 126°38′54″E

Hagik Station (Korean: 학익역) is an under-construction railway station on Suin-Bundang Line of the Seoul Metropolitan Subway system.

- Hakik means the wings of a crane and has the same meaning as in Hakikjin.
- Seoul Metropolitan Subway Suin·Bundang Line K268. Located at 587-189 Hakik-dong, Michuhol-gu, Incheon.

== Hagik-dong ==
It is a legal and administrative dong located in the southern part of Nam-gu, Incheon. Hakiksan, the stem of Mt. Munhaksan, is located here. Hakiksan means 'a mountain in the shape of a crane with its wings spread out', and the name of the mountain was derived from this mountain. The name of Hakik-ri is confirmed in 『Data on the Support of Joseon』. It was called Hakik-ri in 1903, and then changed to Hakik-dong in 1946. Hakik-dong also has the nickname 'Jeun-ri', which comes from the fact that there lived a person named Je-un of the Bupyeong-i clan during the reign of King Sukjong of the Joseon Dynasty. In 1981, it became Hakik-dong, Nam-gu, Incheon directly under the direct control of the city, and in 1995, it was reorganized into Hakik-dong, Nam-gu, Incheon.

=== Hagik Bridge ===
Hagik Bridge is a bridge with a length of about 1,812m in the section between Incheon Interchange in Yonghyeon-dong, Michuhol District, Incheon on the 2nd Gyeongin Expressway and Hagik Junction in Hagik-dong, Michuhol District, Incheon. Since this is the Yonghyeon-dong and Hagik-dong development district, other buildings and structures have not yet been built, and medical facilities, parking lots, and cultural facilities are planned to be built in the future. The closest road nearby is Dokbae-ro, which passes under the Hagik Bridge near the Hagik Junction. In 1914, it was incorporated into Bucheon-gun and named Hagik-ri by combining Nojeoksan and Jeun-ri. In 1940, it was transferred to Incheon-bu and renamed Hagikjeong, and in 1946 it was renamed Hagik-dong. In 1970, it was divided into Hagik 1 and 2 dong. The legal dong, Hagik-dong, consists of the administrative dong, Hagik 1 and 2 dongs.

== Around the station ==
- (Korean: 제2경인고속도로) 2nd Gyeongin Expressway
- (Korean: 학익 분기점) Hakik Junction
- (Korean: 현광아파트1차) Hyeongwang Apartment 1st
- (Korean: 인천미추홀경찰서) Incheon Michuhol Police Station
- (Korean: 인천병무지청) Incheon Military Manpower Administration
- (Korean: 송도고등학교) Songdo High School
- (Korean: 옥련여자고등학교) Okryun Girls' High School
- (Korean: 학익고등학교) Hakik High School
- (Korean: 학익여자고등학교) Hakik Girls' High School
- (Korean: 인주중학교) Inju Middle School
- (Korean: 인천학익초등학교) Incheon Hakik Elementary School
- (Korean: 인천학산초등학교) Incheon Haksan Elementary School
- (Korean: 인천연학초등학교) Incheon Yeonhak Elementary School
- (Korean: 인천인주초등학교) Incheon Inju Elementary School
- (Korean: 인천백학초등학교) Incheon Baekhak Elementary School
