= Songdo station =

Metro station in Incheon, South Korea

송도; Songdo
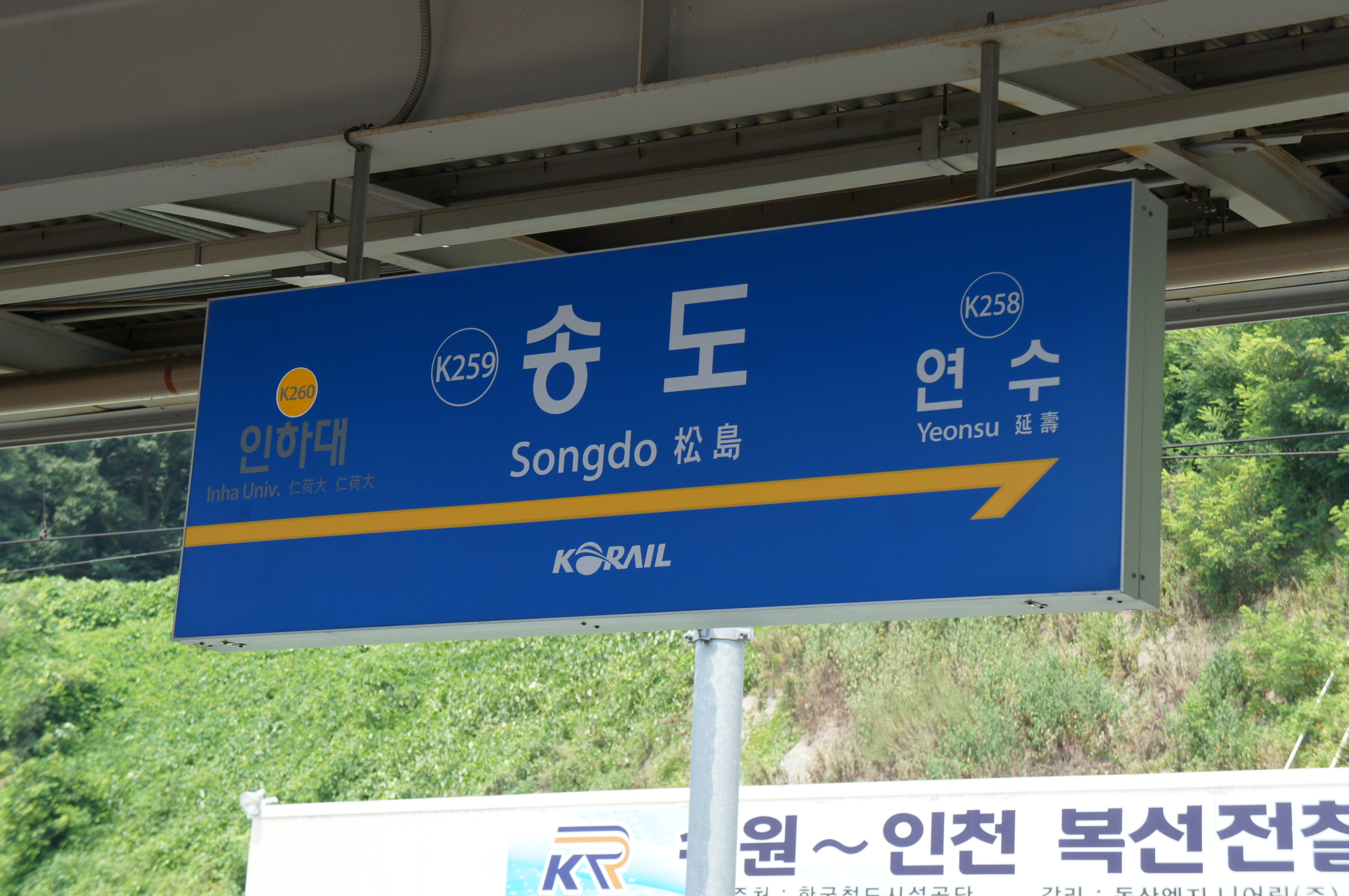

Korean name
- Hangul: 송도역
- Hanja: 松島驛
- Revised Romanization: Songdo-yeok
- McCune–Reischauer: Songdo-yŏk

General information
- Location: 51-3 Ongnyeon-dong, Yeonsu-gu, Incheon
- Coordinates: 37°25′47″N 126°39′16″E
- Operator: Korail
- Line: Suin–Bundang Line
- Platforms: 2
- Tracks: 4

Construction
- Structure type: Aboveground

Key dates
- June 30, 2012: Suin–Bundang Line opened
Location

Songdo Station is a station on the Suin–Bundang Line of the Seoul Metropolitan Subway system. It was the northwestern terminus, until the Phase 2 extension to Incheon Station became operational on February 27, 2016.

It was originally part of the former narrow-gauge Suin Line, before its closure in 1994. With the conversion and double-tracking of the Suin Line, this station was re-opened in 2012.

== Gallery ==
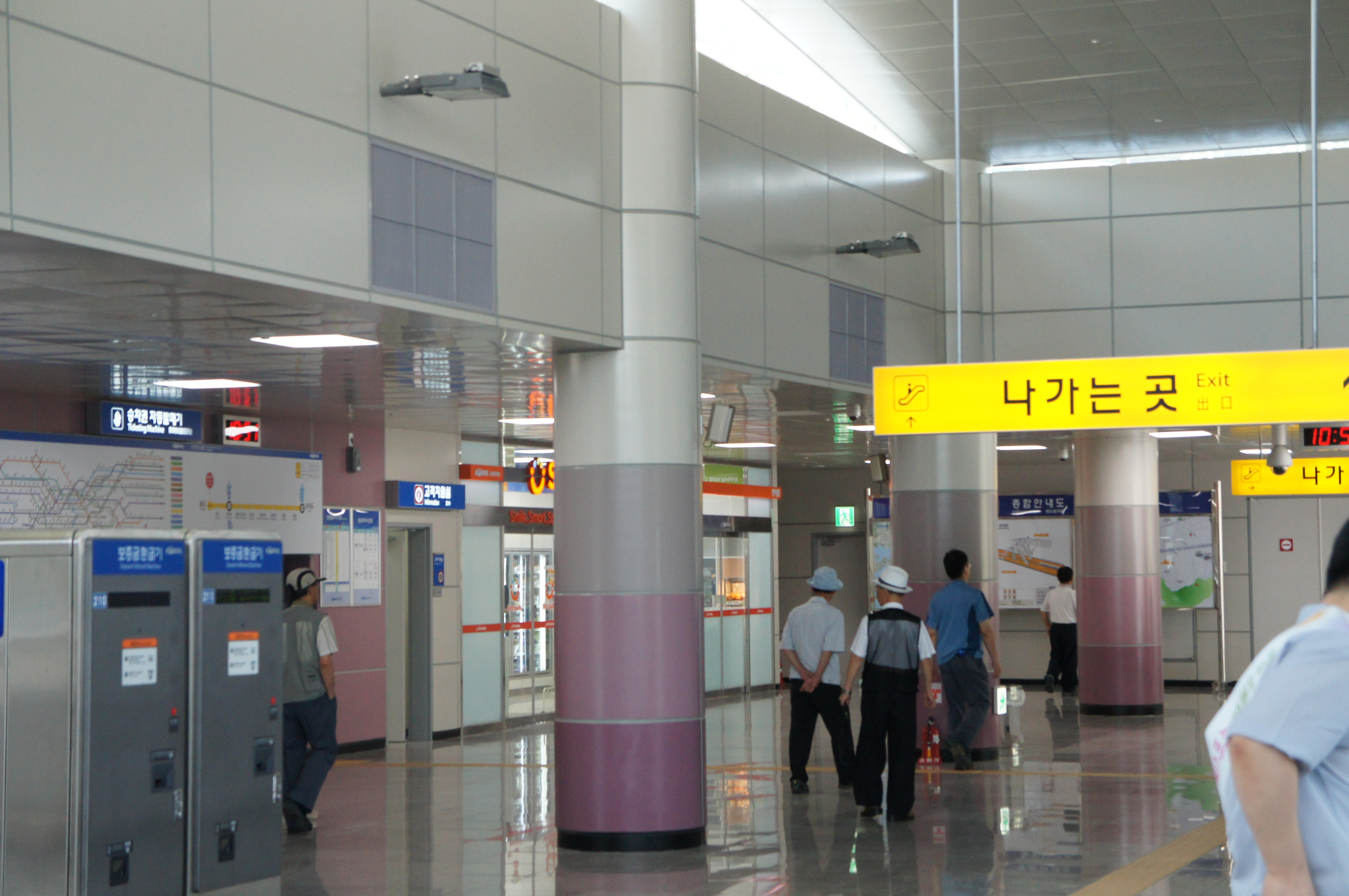
Waiting room

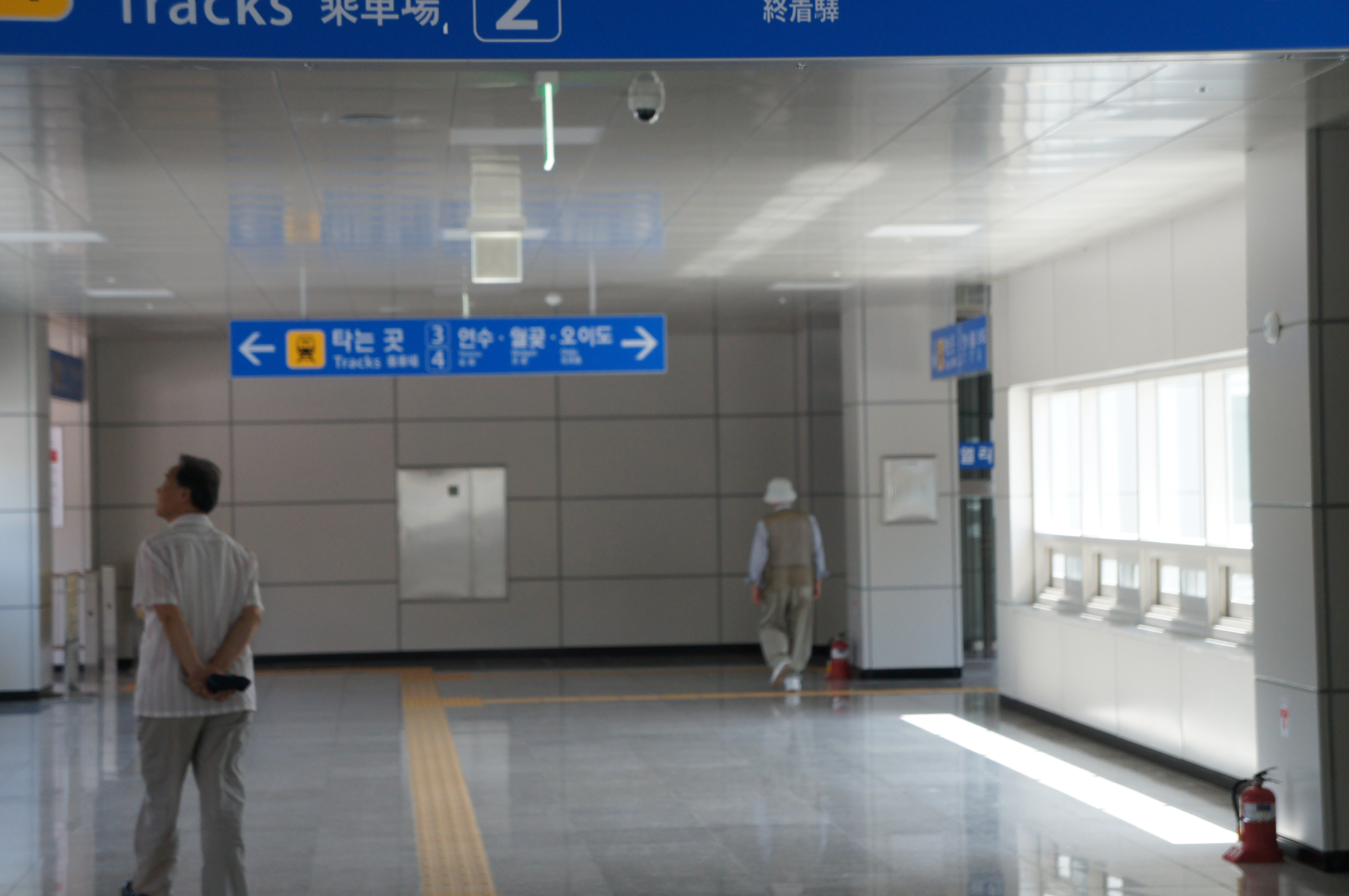
Platform

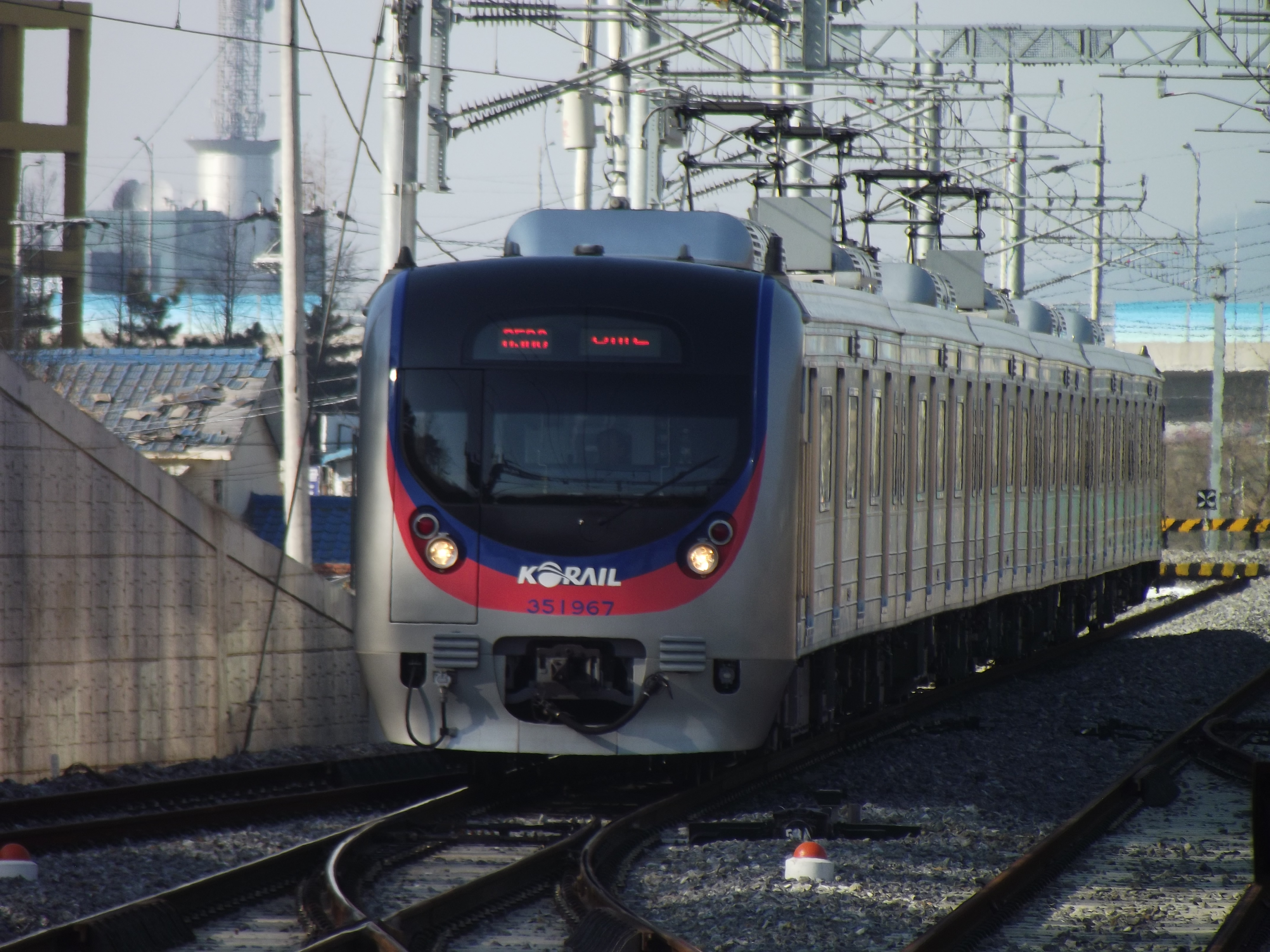
A train entering the station premises from a circuit line

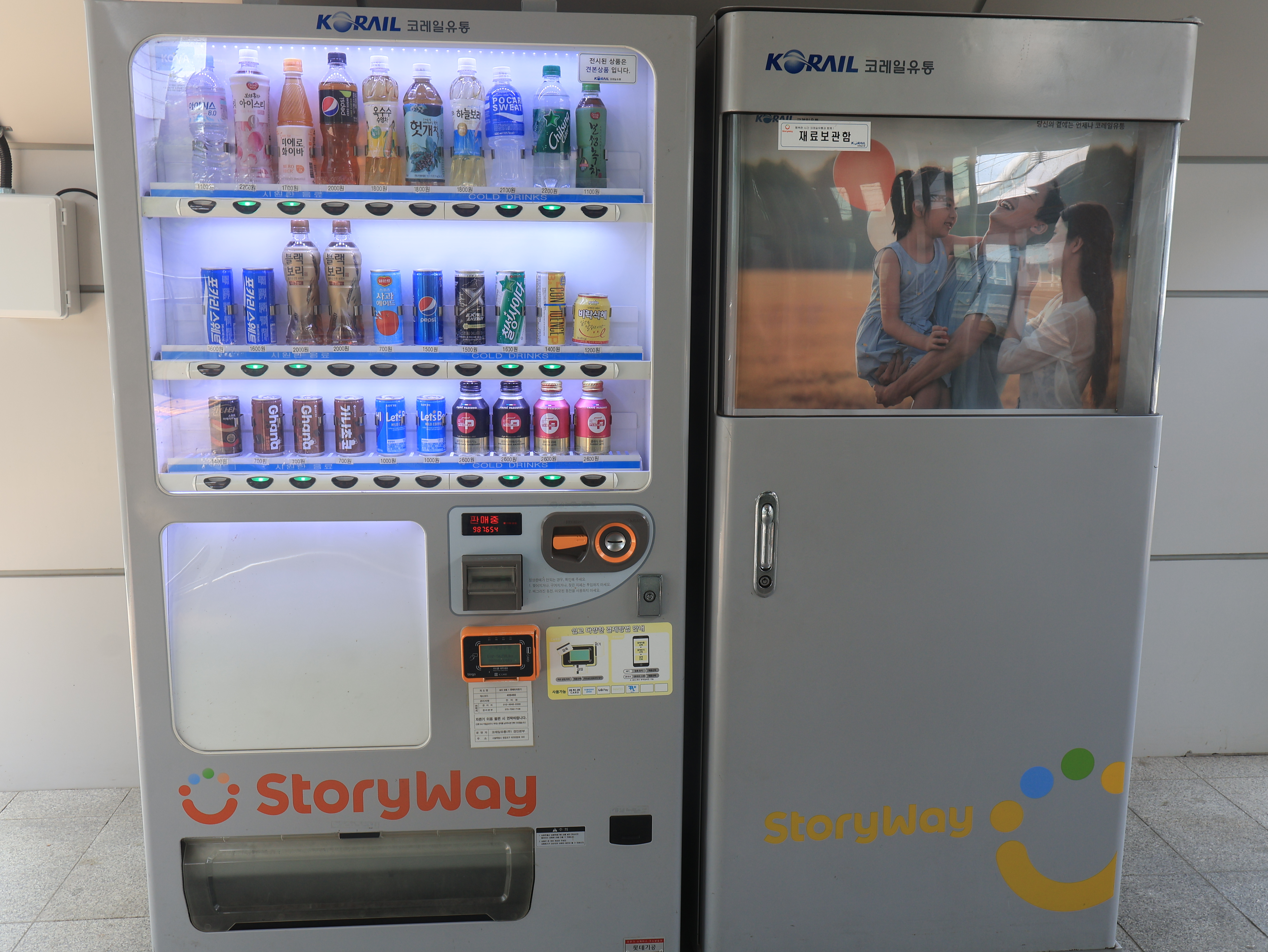
Drink vending machine on platform

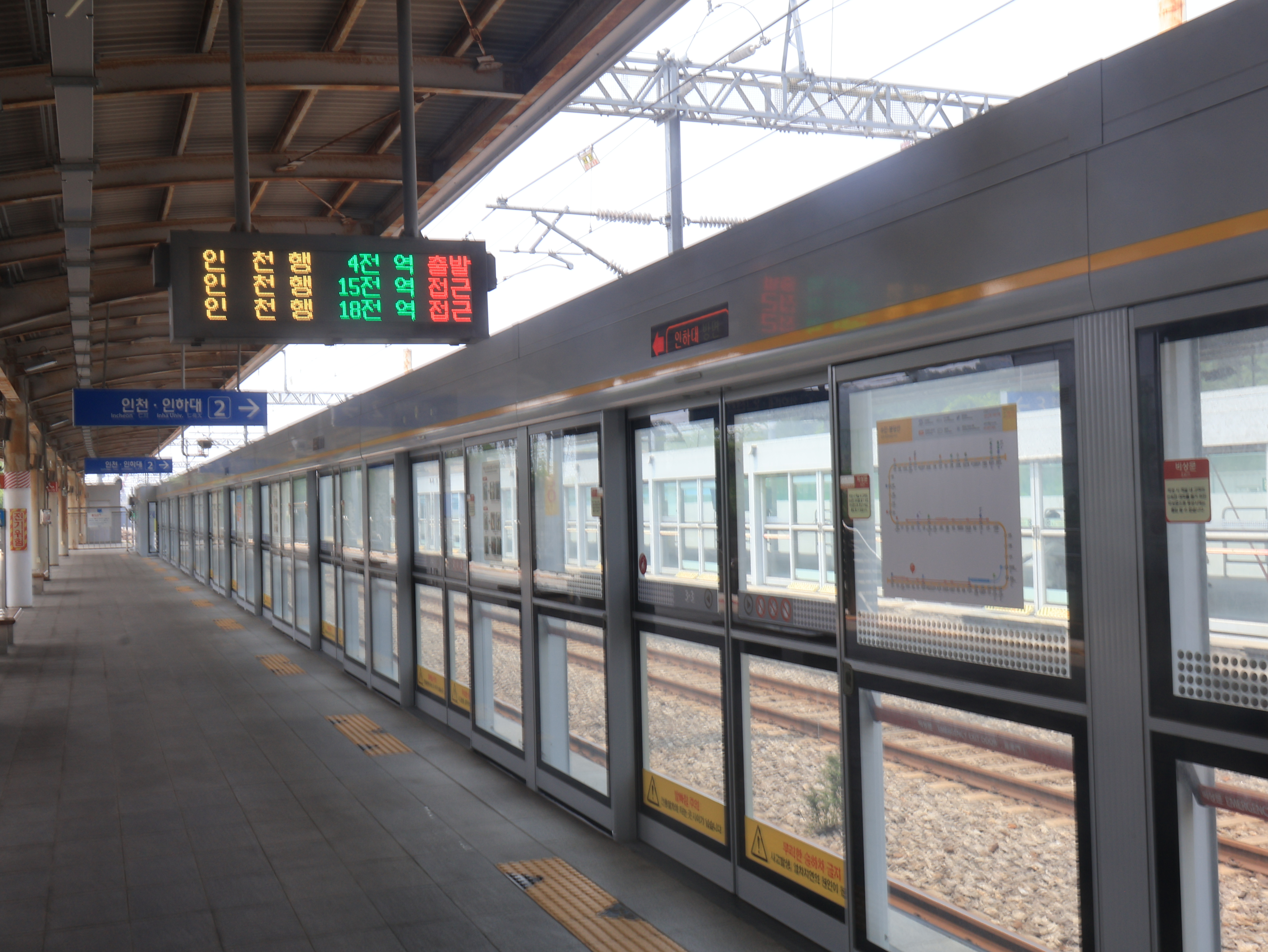
Platform

Preceding station	Seoul Metropolitan Subway	Following station
Yeonsu towards Cheongnyangni	Suin–Bundang Line	Inha University towards Incheon
