= Guseong station =

Metro station in Yongin, South Korea

구성; Guseong
구성; Guseong
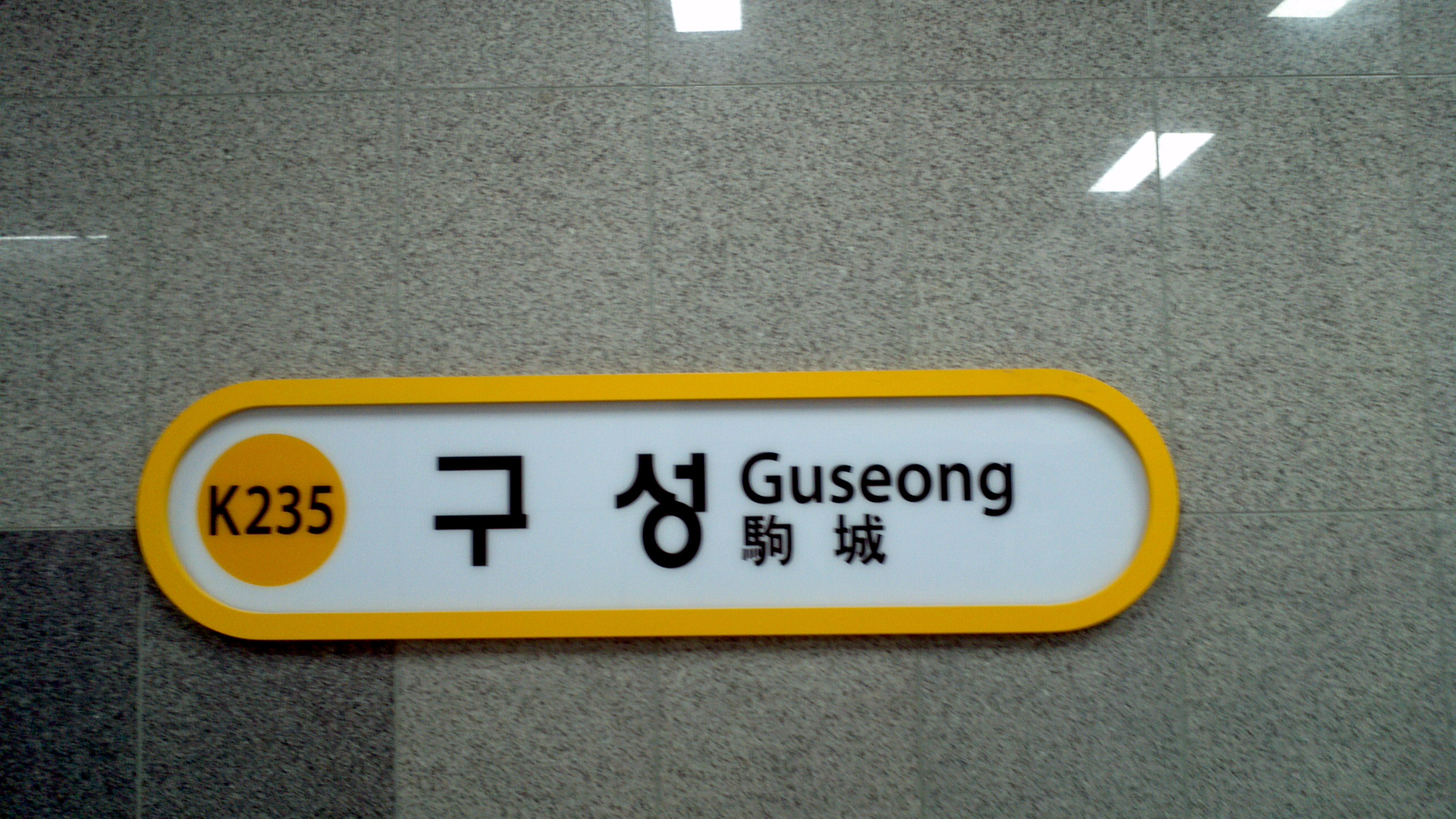

Korean name
- Hangul: 구성역
- Hanja: 駒城驛
- Revised Romanization: Guseong-yeok
- McCune–Reischauer: Kusŏng-yŏk

General information
- Location: 457 Mabuk-dong, Giheung-gu, Yongin-si, Gyeonggi-do
- Coordinates: 37°18′58″N 127°06′28″E
- Operator: Korail; GTX-A Operation
- Lines: Suin–Bundang Line; GTX-A
- Platforms: 2
- Tracks: 4

Construction
- Structure type: Underground

Key dates
- December 28, 2011: Suin–Bundang Line opened
- June 29, 2024: GTX-A opened

Services
Preceding station	Seoul Metropolitan Subway	Following station
Bojeong towards Cheongnyangni	Suin–Bundang Line	Singal towards Incheon
Seongnam towards Suseo	GTX-A	Dongtan Terminus
Location

Guseong Station is a subway station of the Suin–Bundang Line, the commuter subway line of Korail and the national railway of South Korea, as well as the GTX-A.

The station was opened in December 2011 as part of the Giheung extension of the Bundang Line. Near this station, there is E-mart traders, Guseong middle school, and Guseong high school.

== Platforms ==
=== GTX ===
The GTX-A is served by two side platforms.

↑ Dongtan
Seongnam ↓

1	GTX-A	for Dongtan
2	GTX-A	for Suseo

== History ==
GTX service at this station began on 29 June 2024.

== Gallery ==
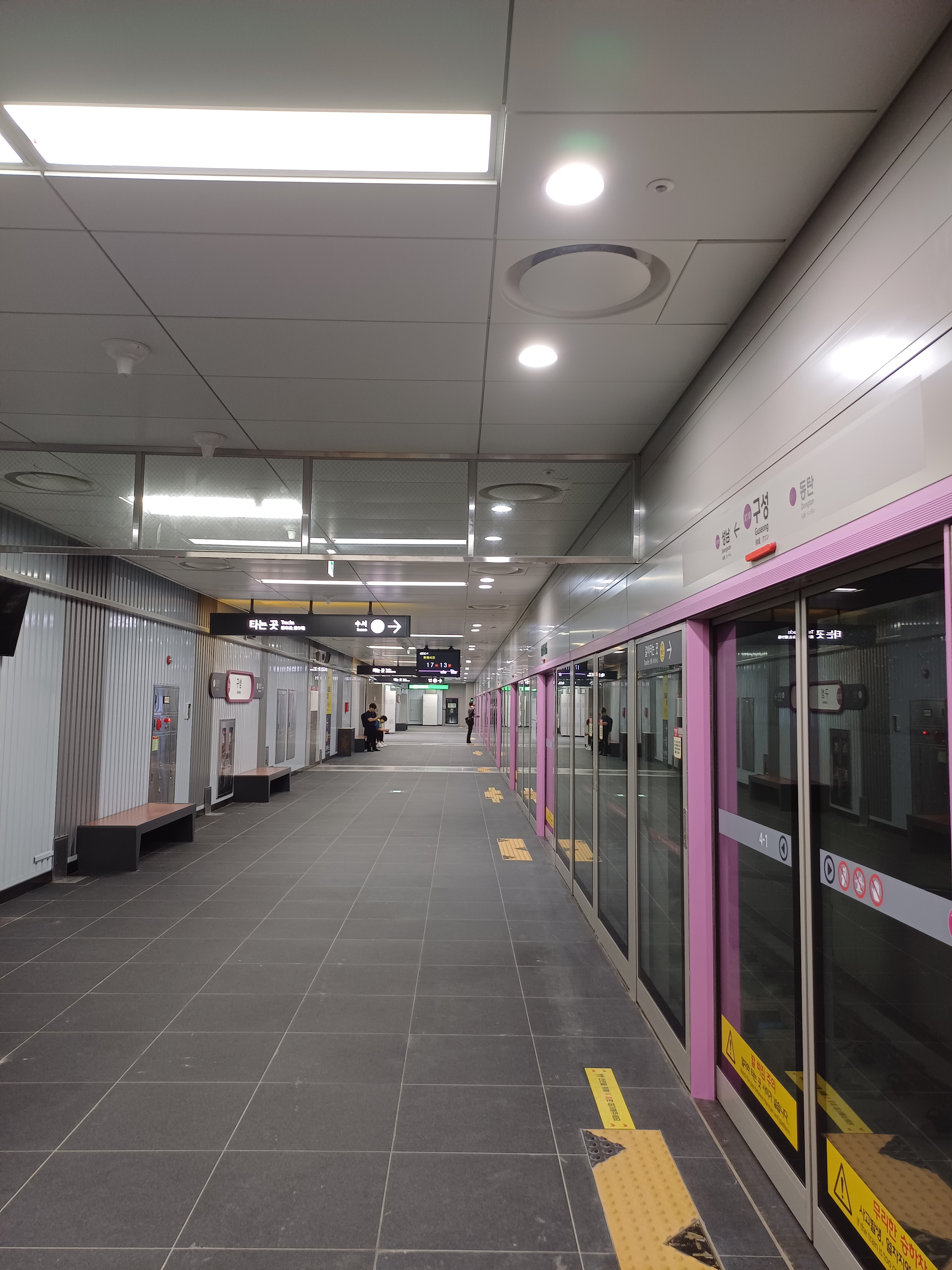
GTX platforms with full-height screen doors

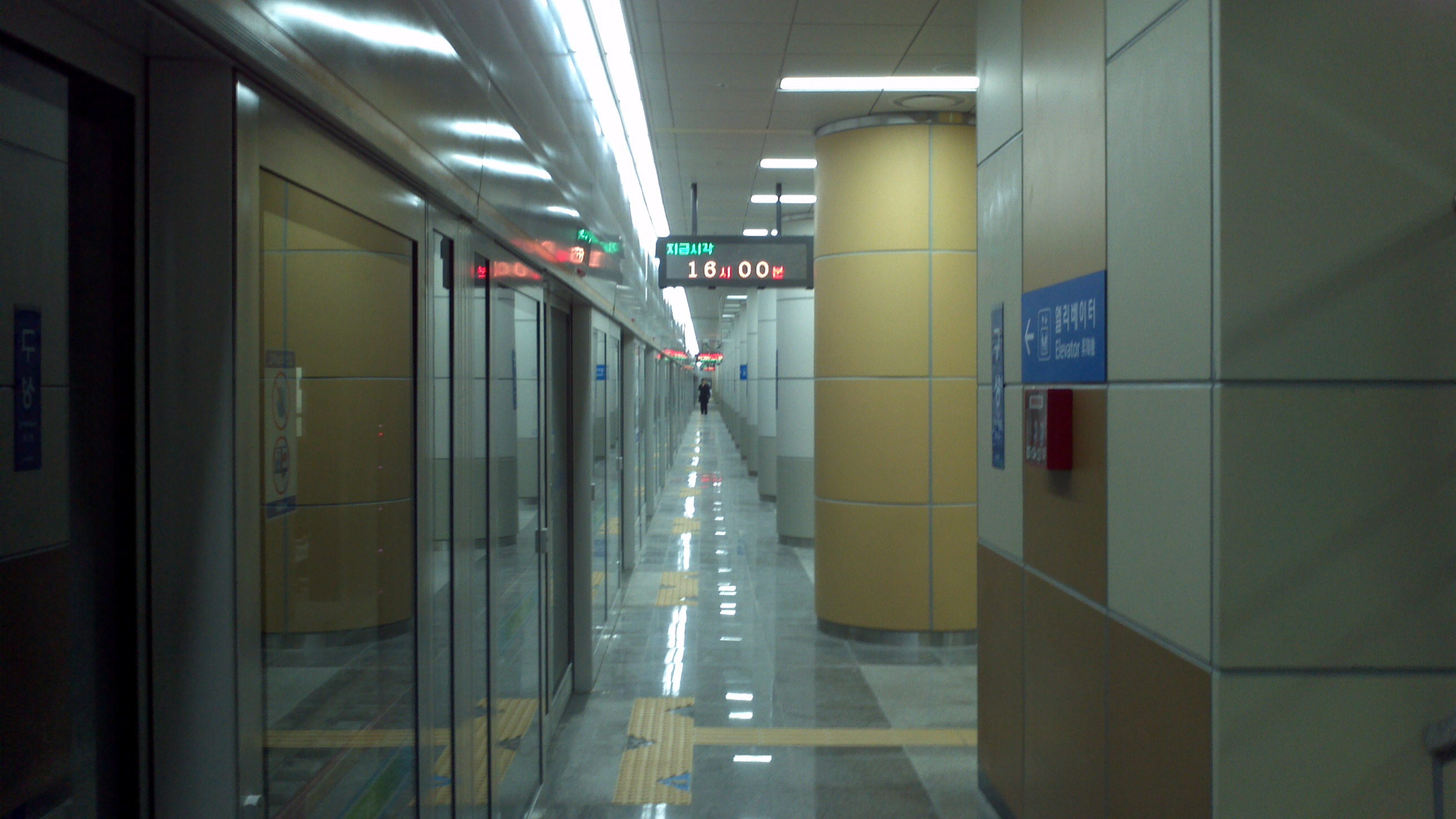
Suin-Bundang line platform

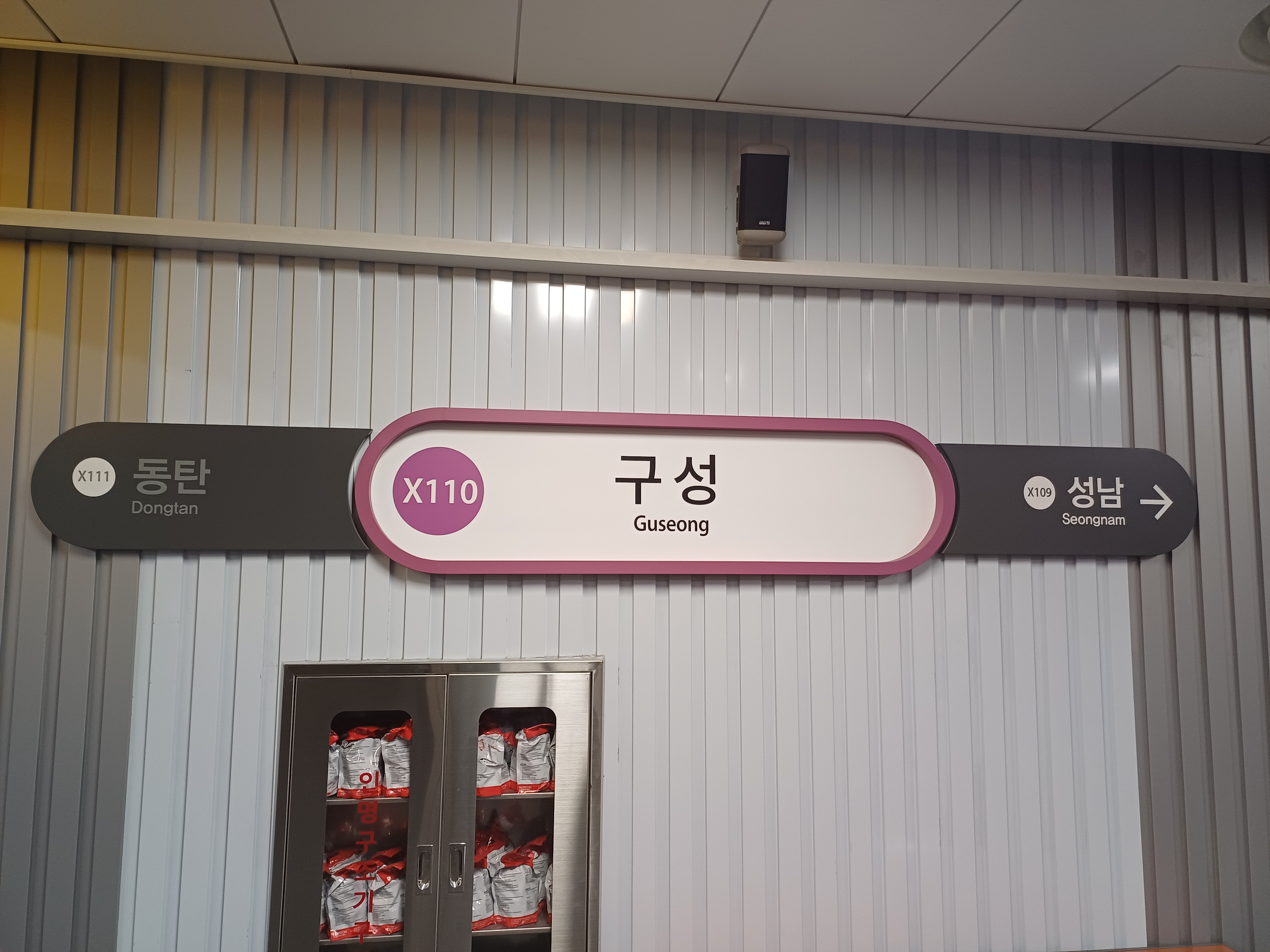
GTX station name sign
