= Suin–Bundang Line =

Railway line in Gyeonggi-do, Incheon and Seoul, South Korea

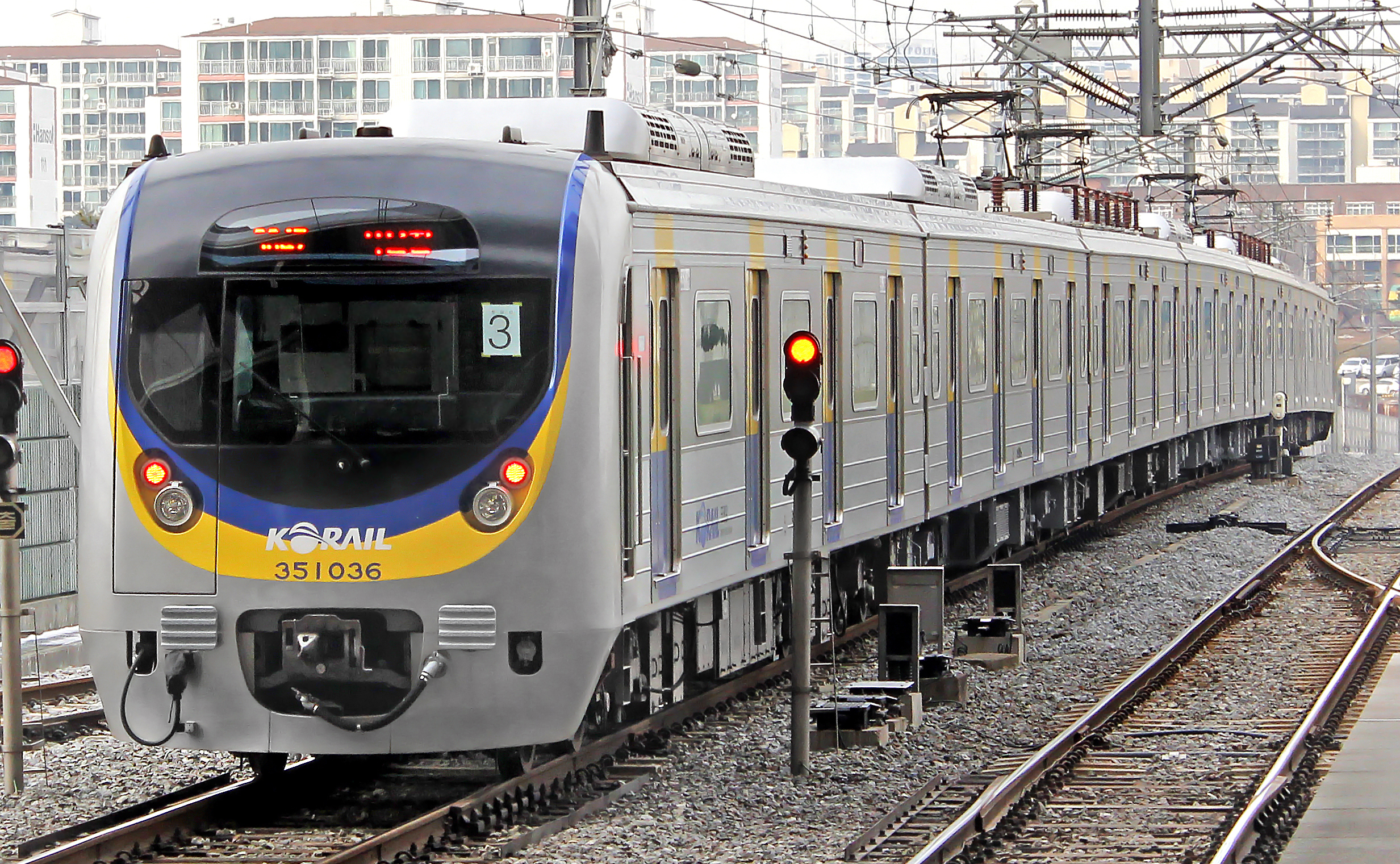

Overview
- Native name: 수인·분당선(水仁·盆唐線); Suin-Bundang-seon
- Status: Operational
- Termini: Wangsimni (most trains) or Cheongnyangni (select trains); Jukjeon / Gosaek / Incheon
- Stations: 63

Service
- Type: Commuter rail
- System: Seoul Metropolitan Subway
- Operator: Korail
- Depot(s): Bundang Depot, Siheung Depot
- Rolling stock: Korail Class 351000 (61 trains)

History
- Opened: 12 September 2020 (Bundang: September 1, 1994) (Suin: June 30, 2012)

Technical
- Line length: 104.5 km (64.9 mi)
- Number of tracks: 2
- Track gauge: 1,435 mm (4 ft 8 1/2 in) standard gauge
- Electrification: 25 kV AC 60 Hz
- Operating speed: 100 km/h (62 mph)

The Suin–Bundang Line (Korean: 수인·분당선; Suwon–Incheon–Bundang Line) is a commuter rail service of the Seoul Metropolitan Subway system, operating on trackage from the Suin Line (opened on June 30, 2012) and the Bundang Line (opened on September 1, 1994). Operation began on September 12, 2020.

Frequent service is provided between Wangsimni and Incheon by 6-car trains, with 9 trains on weekdays and 5 on weekends running one station north of Wangsimni to Cheongnyangni. However, many trains terminate at various locations on the line such as Jukjeon, Gosaek, and Oido.

Trains travel along the Suin (Incheon-Suwon), Bundang (Suwon-Wangsimni), and Gyeongwon (Wangsimni-Cheongnyangni) lines. It shares trackage with the Ansan Line of Seoul Subway Line 4 between Hanyang University at Ansan and Oido.

Like all other Korail-run Seoul Metropolitan Subway lines, trains on the line run on the left-hand side of the track.

The color shown on the map is yellow.

== History ==
1994	September 1	The Bundang Line section is officially opened from Suseo to Ori as the Bundang Line.
2003	September 3	The Bundang Line section is extended northward from Suseo to Seolleung.
2004	January 16	Imae station opens as an in-fill station on the Bundang Line section.
2004	September 24	Guryong station opens as an in-fill station on the Bundang Line section.
2004	November 26	A temporary Bojeong station opens on the Bundang Line section.
2007	December 24	Jukjeon station opens as an in-fill station on the Bundang Line section.
2011	December 28	The Bundang Line section is extended southward from Jukjeon to Giheung. The temporary Bojeong station is replaced with a new underground station, also called Bojeong.
2012	June 30	The Suin Line section is officially opened from Oido to Songdo as the Suin Line.
2012	October 6	The Bundang Line section line is extended northward from Seolleung to Wangsimni.
2012	December 1	The Bundang Line section line is extended southward from Giheung to Mangpo.
2013	November 30	The Bundang Line section is extended westward from Mangpo to Suwon, allowing for connections to Line 1. Express service is launched on the Bundang Line section.
2014	December 27	Darwol station opens as an in-fill station on the Suin Line section.
2016	February 27	The Suin Line section is extended westward from Songdo to Incheon.
2017	July 10	Express service is launched on the Suin Line section.
2018	December 31	The Bundang Line section is extended northeastward to Cheongnyangni station, allowing for connections to the Gyeongchun Line, Line 1, and regional rail services.
2020	September 12	The Suin Line section is extended eastward from Oido to Suwon, and the present Suin-Bundang Line is formed when the Suin and Bundang lines are merged.

=== Future plans ===
Hagik station is planned to open between Songdo and Inha University in 2026. In addition, a connection line is under consideration at Suwon that will allow KTX trains to run between the Gyeongbu high-speed railway and Incheon Station via the Suin Line by 2025.

== Rapid (Express) trains ==
Korail operates a variety of express "rapid" (급행) trains for regional services on the Suin-Bundang Line during rush hours. These services include:

- Bundang Line express services, operating express between Gosaek (where they originate or terminate) and Jukjeon and then continuing as local trains to Wangsimni or Cheongnyangni.
- Suin Line express services, operating express between Incheon and Oido (where they originate or terminate).

== Stations ==
=== Current Routes ===
- Wangsimni — Jukjeon/Gosaek/Incheon (most trains)
- Cheongnyangni — Jukjeon/Gosaek (selected trains)
- Oido — Incheon (S express)
- Wangsimni — Gosaek (B express, Wangsimni — Jukjeon all stops)

=== Stations ===
B: Bundang Express Line
S: Suin Express Line

●	stops at the station
｜	does not stop at the station
▲	limited service (only some trains stop)

Station; Number	Station; Name; English	Station; Name; Hangul	S	B	Transfer		Distance in km	Total; Distance	Location		
K209	Cheongnyangni	청량리	No service	No service	Mugunghwa-ho, ITX-Saemaeul and Nuriro services		---	-2.4	Seoul	Dongdaemun-gu	
K210	Wangsimni	왕십리	No service	Makes all stops	Gyeongui–Jungang Line		2.4	0.0	Seoul	Seongdong-gu	
K211	Seoul Forest	서울숲	No service	Makes all stops			2.2	2.2	Seoul	Seongdong-gu	
K212	Apgujeongrodeo	압구정로데오	No service	Makes all stops			1.9	4.1	Seoul	Gangnam-gu	
K213	Gangnam-gu Office	강남구청	No service	Makes all stops	Seoul Subway Line 7		1.2	5.3	Seoul	Gangnam-gu	
K214	Seonjeongneung	선정릉	No service	Makes all stops	Seoul Subway Line 9		0.7	6.0	Seoul	Gangnam-gu	
K215	Seolleung	선릉	No service	Makes all stops	Seoul Subway Line 2		0.7	6.7	Seoul	Gangnam-gu	
K216	Hanti	한티	No service	Makes all stops			1.0	7.7	Seoul	Gangnam-gu	
K217	Dogok	도곡	No service	Makes all stops	Seoul Subway Line 3		0.7	8.4	Seoul	Gangnam-gu	
K218	Guryong	구룡	No service	Makes all stops			0.6	9.0	Seoul	Gangnam-gu	
K219	Gaepo-dong	개포동	No service	Makes all stops			0.7	9.7	Seoul	Gangnam-gu	
K220	Daemosan	대모산 입구	No service	Makes all stops			0.6	10.3	Seoul	Gangnam-gu	
K221	Suseo	수서	No service	Makes all stops	Great Train eXpress		3.0	13.3	Seoul	Gangnam-gu	
K222	Bokjeong	복정	No service	Makes all stops	Seoul Subway Line 8		3.2	16.5	Seoul	Songpa-gu	
K223	Gachon University	가천대	No service	Makes all stops			2.4	18.9	Gyeonggi -do	Seongnam -si	Sujeong -gu
K224	Taepyeong	태평	No service	Makes all stops			1.0	19.9	Gyeonggi -do	Seongnam -si	Sujeong -gu
K225	Moran	모란	No service	Makes all stops	Seoul Subway Line 8		0.9	20.8	Gyeonggi -do	Seongnam -si	Jungwon -gu
K226	Yatap	야탑	No service	Makes all stops			2.3	23.1	Gyeonggi -do	Seongnam -si	Bundang -gu
K227	Imae	이매	No service	Makes all stops	Gyeonggang Line		1.7	24.8	Gyeonggi -do	Seongnam -si	Bundang -gu
K228	Seohyeon	서현	No service	Makes all stops			1.4	26.2	Gyeonggi -do	Seongnam -si	Bundang -gu
K229	Sunae	수내	No service	Makes all stops			1.1	27.3	Gyeonggi -do	Seongnam -si	Bundang -gu
K230	Jeongja	정자	No service	Makes all stops	Shinbundang Line		1.6	28.9	Gyeonggi -do	Seongnam -si	Bundang -gu
K231	Migeum	미금	No service	Makes all stops	Shinbundang Line		1.8	30.7	Gyeonggi -do	Seongnam -si	Bundang -gu
K232	Ori	오리	No service	Makes all stops			1.1	31.8	Gyeonggi -do	Seongnam -si	Bundang -gu
K233	Jukjeon	죽전	No service	●			1.8	33.6	Gyeonggi -do	Yongin -si	Suji-gu
K234	Bojeong	보정	No service	｜			1.3	34.9	Gyeonggi -do	Yongin -si	Giheung -gu
K235	Guseong	구성	No service	｜	Great Train eXpress		1.6	36.5	Gyeonggi -do	Yongin -si	Giheung -gu
K236	Singal	신갈	No service	｜			1.6	38.1	Gyeonggi -do	Yongin -si	Giheung -gu
K237	Giheung	기흥	No service	●	Everline		1.4	39.5	Gyeonggi -do	Yongin -si	Giheung -gu
K238	Sanggal	상갈	No service	｜			1.9	41.4	Gyeonggi -do	Yongin -si	Giheung -gu
K239	Cheongmyeong	청명	No service	｜			2.8	44.2	Gyeonggi -do	Suwon -si	Yeongtong -gu
K240	Yeongtong	영통	No service	｜			1.1	45.3	Gyeonggi -do	Suwon -si	Yeongtong -gu
K241	Mangpo	망포	No service	●			1.5	46.8	Gyeonggi -do	Suwon -si	Yeongtong -gu
K242	MaetanGwonseon	매탄권선	No service	｜			1.8	48.6	Gyeonggi -do	Suwon -si	Yeongtong -gu
K243	Suwon City Hall	수원시청	No service	●			1.4	50.0	Gyeonggi -do	Suwon -si	Gwonseon -gu
K244	Maegyo	매교	No service	｜			1.4	51.4	Gyeonggi -do	Suwon -si	Paldal -gu
K245	Suwon	수원	No service	●	Mugunghwa-ho, Saemaeul-ho, and ITX-Saemaeul services		1.5	52.9	Gyeonggi -do	Suwon -si	Paldal -gu
K246	Gosaek	고색	No service	●			2.7	55.6	Gyeonggi -do	Suwon -si	Gwonseon -gu
K247	Omokcheon	오목천	No service	No service			1.6	57.2	Gyeonggi -do	Suwon -si	Gwonseon -gu
K248	Eocheon	어천	No service	No service			5.1	62.3	Gyeonggi -do	Hwaseong-si	Hyohaeng -gu
K249	Yamok	야목	No service	No service			2.6	64.9	Gyeonggi -do	Hwaseong-si	Hyohaeng -gu
K250	Sari	사리	No service	No service			4.9	69.6	Gyeonggi -do	Ansan-si	Sangnok -gu
K251	Hanyang Univ. at Ansan	한대앞	No service	No service	Line 4 (shared)	Seoul Subway Line 4	2.2	71.8	Gyeonggi -do	Ansan-si	Sangnok -gu
K252	Jungang	중앙	No service	No service	Line 4 (shared)		1.6	73.4	Gyeonggi -do	Ansan-si	Danwon -gu
K253	Gojan	고잔	No service	No service	Line 4 (shared)		1.4	74.8	Gyeonggi -do	Ansan-si	Danwon -gu
K254	Choji	초지	No service	No service	Line 4 (shared)	Seohae Line	1.5	76.3	Gyeonggi -do	Ansan-si	Danwon -gu
K255	Ansan	안산	No service	No service	Line 4 (shared)		1.8	78.1	Gyeonggi -do	Ansan-si	Danwon -gu
K256	Singiloncheon	신길온천	No service	No service	Line 4 (shared)		2.2	80.3	Gyeonggi -do	Ansan-si	Danwon -gu
K257	Jeongwang	정왕	No service	No service	Line 4 (shared)		2.9	83.2	Gyeonggi -do	Siheung-si	
K258	Oido	오이도	●	No service	Line 4 (shared)	Seoul Subway Line 4	1.4	84.6	Gyeonggi -do	Siheung-si	
K259	Darwol	달월	｜	No service			2.1	86.7	Gyeonggi -do	Siheung-si	
K260	Wolgot	월곶	｜	No service			1.5	88.2	Gyeonggi -do	Siheung-si	
K261	Soraepogu	소래포구	●	No service			1.3	89.5	Incheon	Namdong-gu	
K262	Incheon Nonhyeon	인천논현	●	No service			1.0	90.5	Incheon	Namdong-gu	
K263	Hogupo	호구포	｜	No service			1.3	91.8	Incheon	Namdong-gu	
K264	Namdong Induspark	남동인더스파크	｜	No service			1.3	93.1	Incheon	Namdong-gu	
K265	Woninjae	원인재	●	No service	Incheon Subway Line 1		1.0	94.1	Incheon	Yeonsu-gu	
K266	Yeonsu	연수	●	No service			0.9	95.0	Incheon	Yeonsu-gu	
K267	Songdo	송도	｜	No service			2.7	97.7	Incheon	Yeonsu-gu	
K268	Hagik (2026)	학익	｜	No service			1.3	99.0	Incheon	Michuhol-gu	
K269	Inha University	인하대	●	No service			1.1	100.1	Incheon	Michuhol-gu	
K270	Sungui	숭의	｜	No service			1.8	101.9	Incheon	Michuhol-gu	
K271	Sinpo	신포	｜	No service			1.5	103.4	Incheon	Jemulpo-gu	
K272	Incheon	인천	●	No service	Wolmi Sea Train		1.1	104.5	Incheon	Jemulpo-gu	

== Rolling Stock ==
- Korail Class 351000 6-car EMU
  - 1st generation: 351-01~351-22 – 1993-2024 (Retired)
  - 2nd generation: 351-23~351-28 – since 2003
  - 3rd generation: 351-29~351-43, 351–61~351–78 – since 2011
  - 4th generation: 351-44~351-59, 351-79 - since 2022
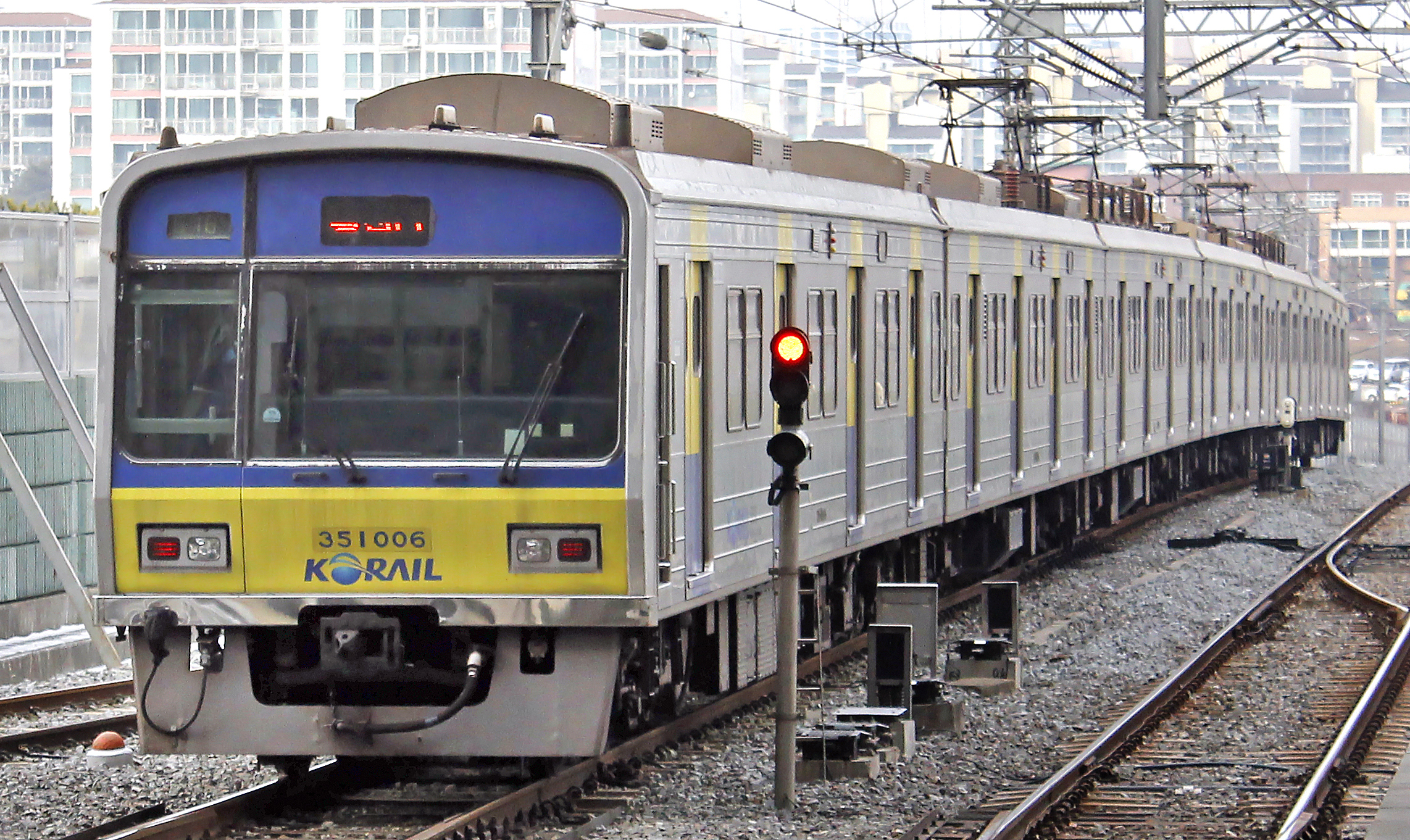
Korail Class 351000 EMU (1st generation)

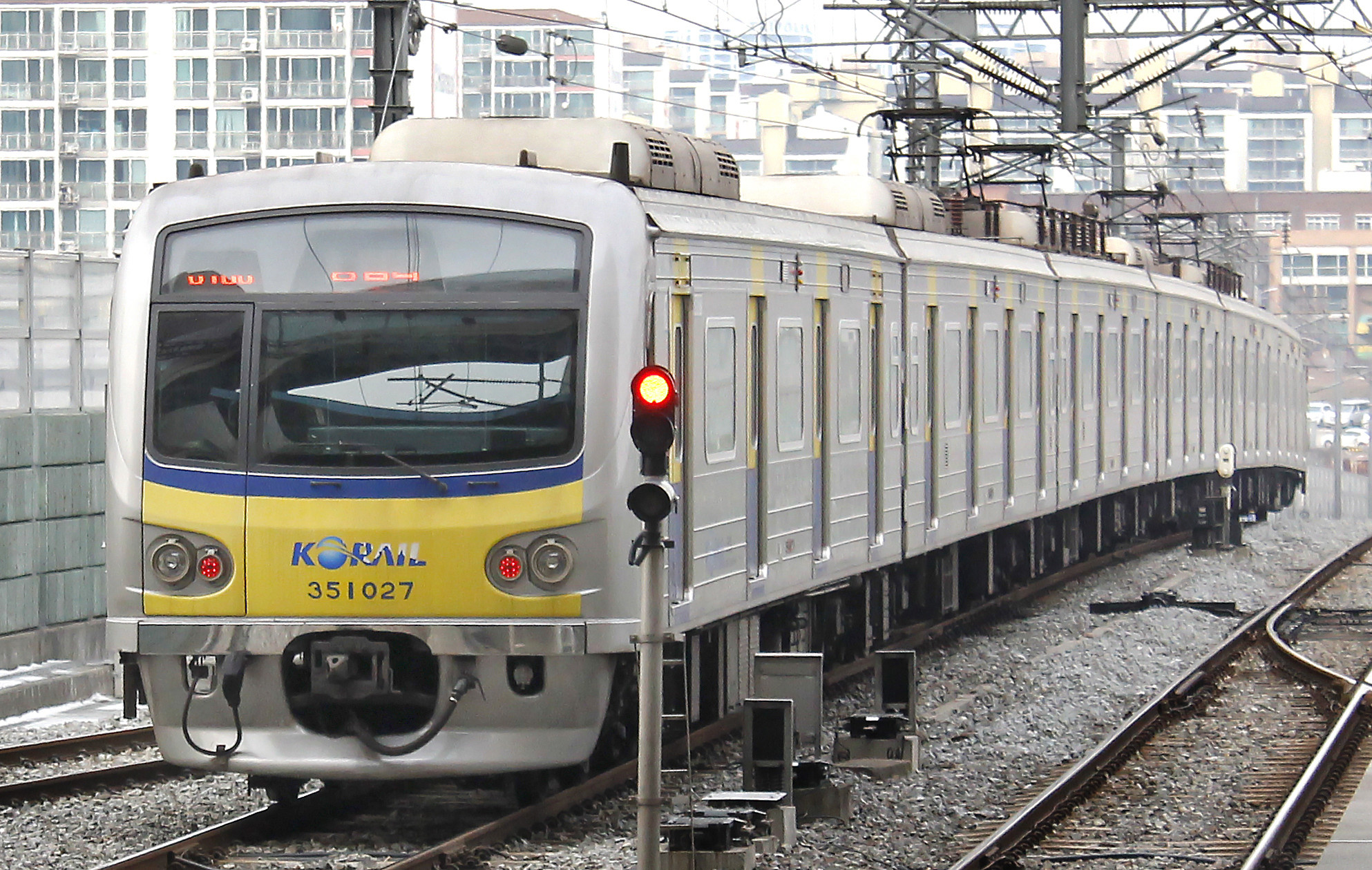
Korail Class 351000 EMU (2nd generation)

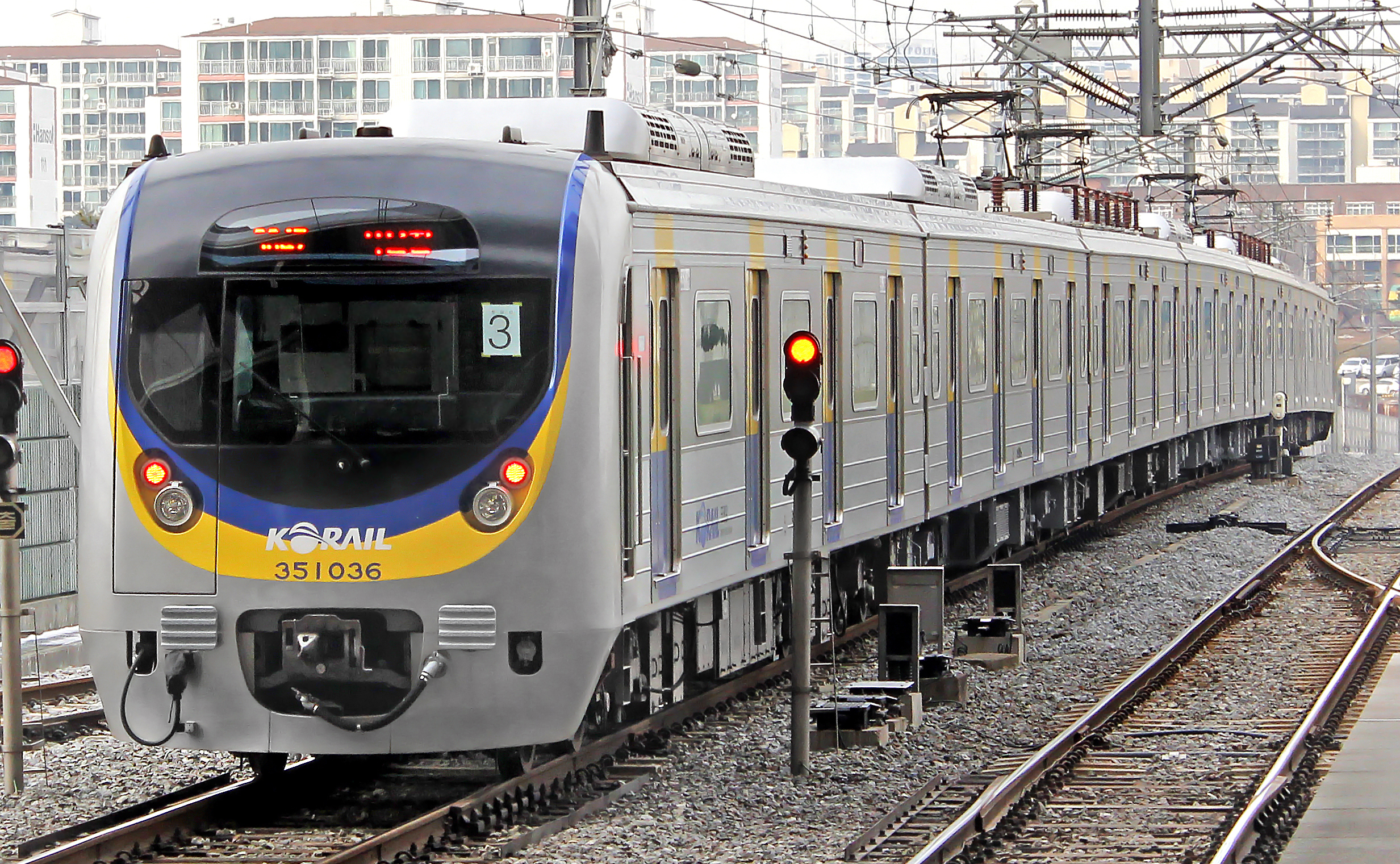
Korail Class 351000 EMU (3rd generation)

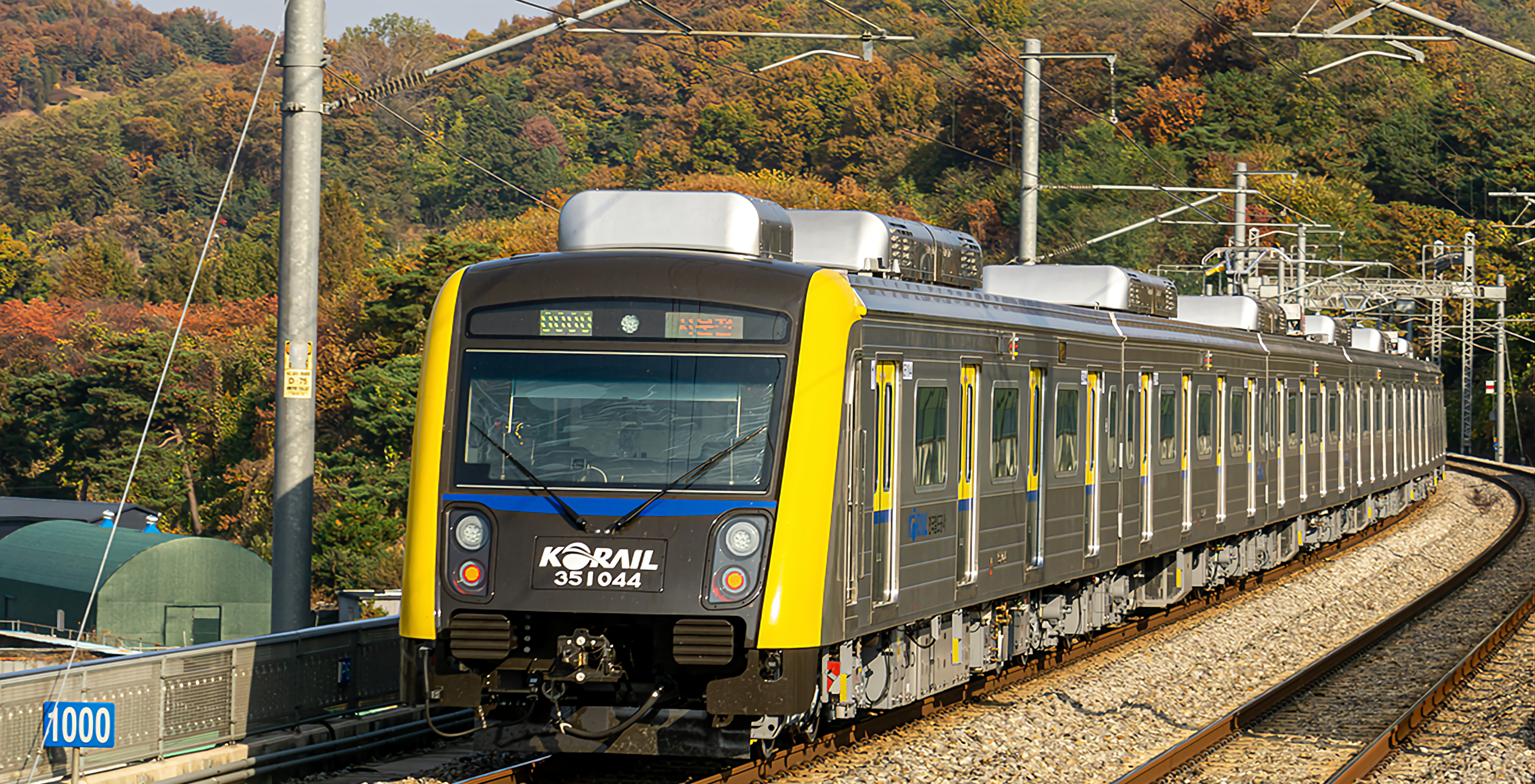
Korail Class 351000 EMU (4th generation)
