= Guryong station =

Metro station in Seoul, South Korea

Coordinates: 37°29′12″N 127°03′33″E

구룡; Guryong
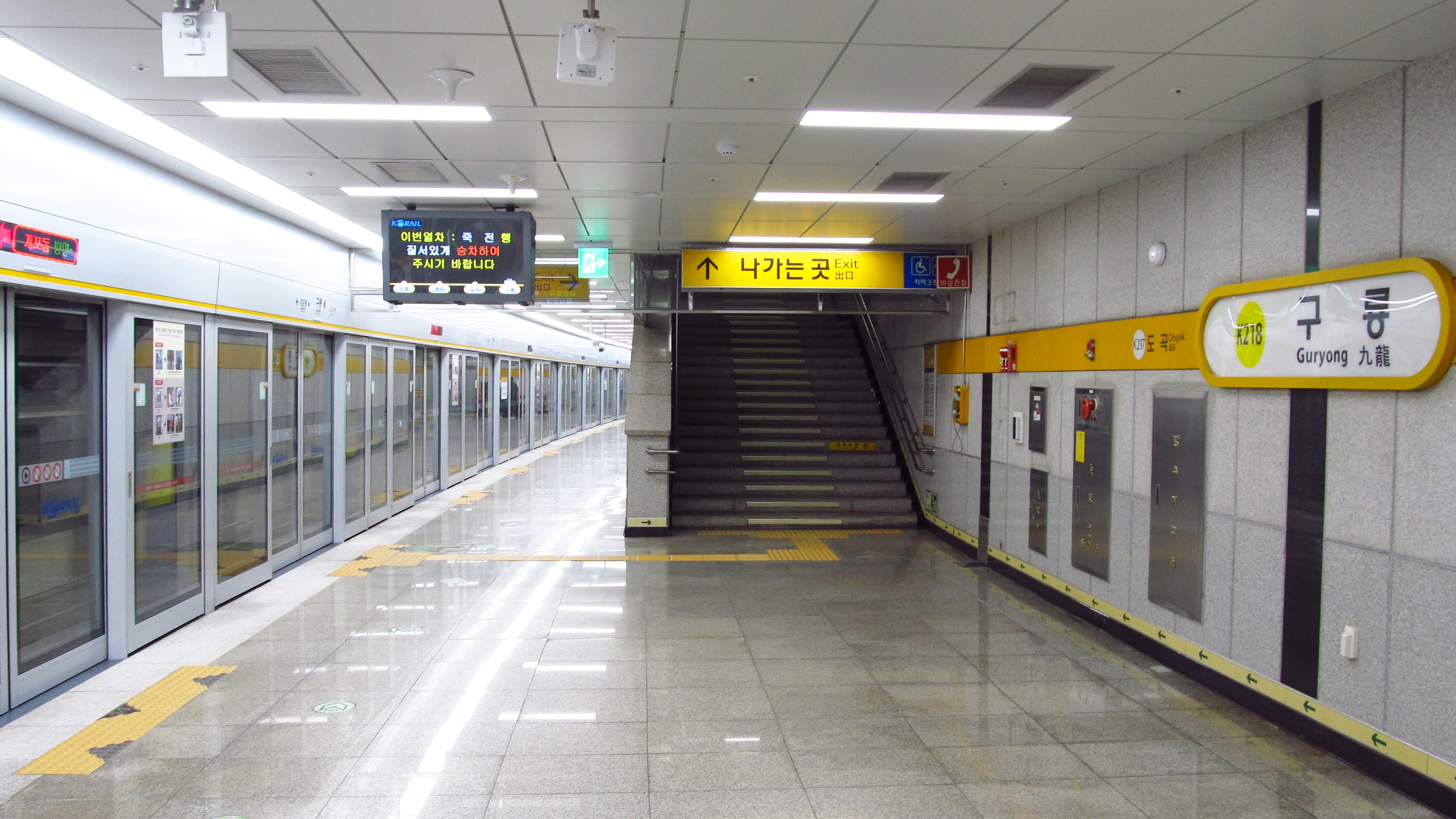

Korean name
- Hangul: 구룡역
- Hanja: 九龍驛
- Revised Romanization: Guryong-yeok
- McCune–Reischauer: Kuryong-yŏk

General information
- Location: 175-3 Gaepo-dong, 403 Gaeporo, Gangnam-gu, Seoul
- Operator: Korail
- Line: Suin–Bundang Line
- Platforms: 2
- Tracks: 2

Construction
- Structure type: Underground

Key dates
- September 24, 2004: Suin–Bundang Line opened
Location

Guryong station (Korean: 구룡역) is a station on the Suin–Bundang Line of the Seoul Metropolitan Subway network in South Korea. It is in the Gaepo-dong area of the Gangnam District of Seoul. The station opened on October 24, 2004.

Preceding station	Seoul Metropolitan Subway	Following station
Dogok towards Cheongnyangni	Suin–Bundang Line	Gaepo-dong towards Incheon
