= Jukjeon station =

Metro station in Yongin, South Korea

죽전 (단국대); Jukjeon (Dankook Univ.)
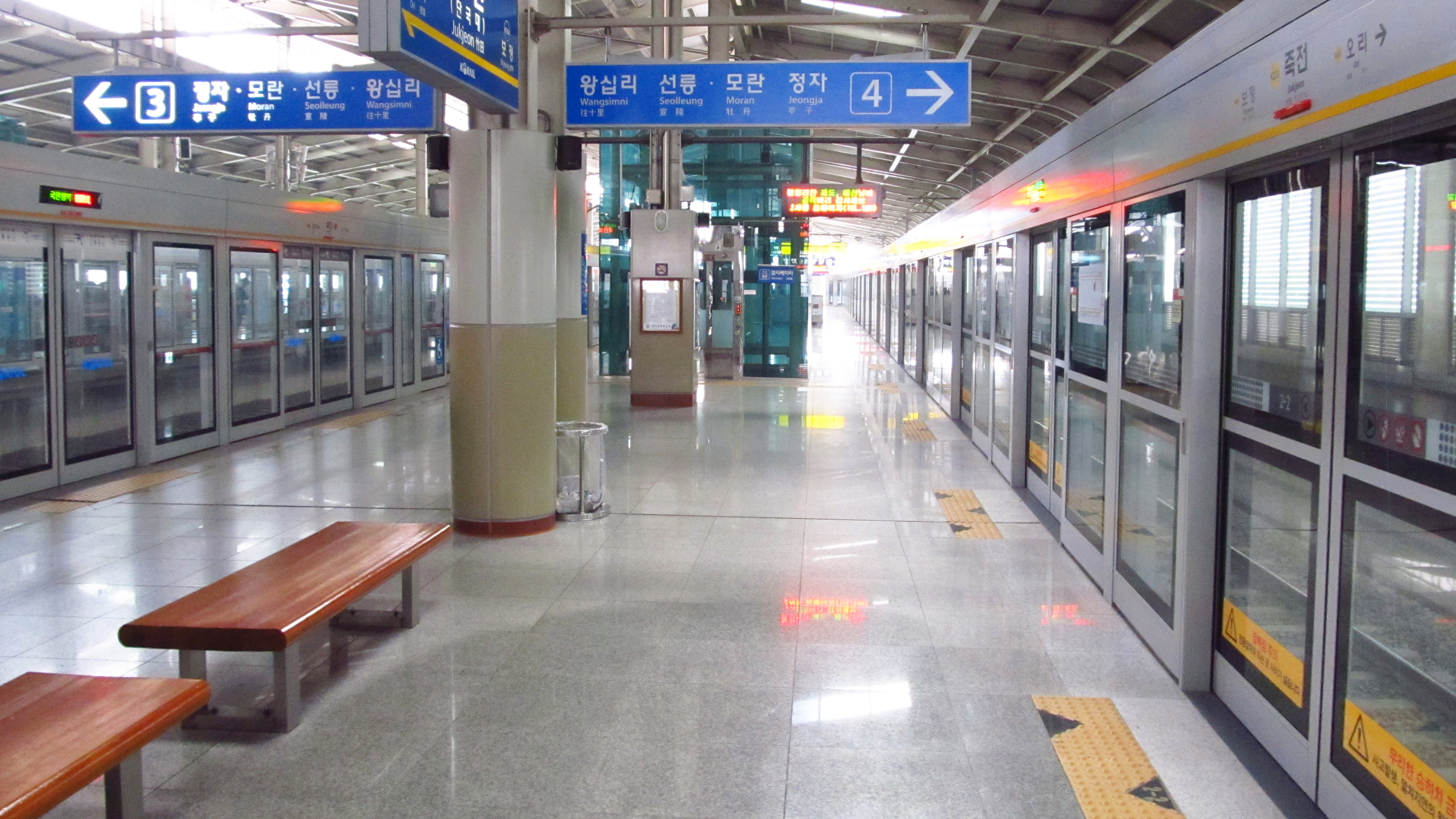

Korean name
- Hangul: 죽전역
- Hanja: 竹田驛
- Revised Romanization: Jukjeon-nyeok
- McCune–Reischauer: Chukchŏn-nyŏk

General information
- Location: 1289 Jukjeon-dong, 536 Poeundaero, Suji-gu, Yongin-si, Gyeonggi-do
- Coordinates: 37°19′30″N 127°06′37″E
- Operator: Korail
- Line: Suin–Bundang Line
- Platforms: 2
- Tracks: 4

Construction
- Structure type: Aboveground

Key dates
- December 24, 2007: Suin–Bundang Line opened
Location

Jukjeon Station (Korean: 죽전역) is a station on the Suin–Bundang Line, located in Jukjeon-dong of Suji-gu, Yongin. It opened on Christmas Eve in 2007 and plays a crucial role in relieving the traffic congestion of the northwestern part of Yongin. It is also the closest station to the Yongin campus of Dankook University, with shuttle buses expected to run between the university and the station.

This station is unique in that it is built into the Jukjeon Shinsegae Department Store.

Its station subname is Dankook Univ., where said university is located nearby.

Preceding station	Seoul Metropolitan Subway	Following station
Ori towards Cheongnyangni	Suin–Bundang Line	Bojeong towards Incheon
Ori towards Wangsimni	Suin–Bundang Line Bundang Express Line	Giheung towards Gosaek
