= Darwol station =

Railway station in Siheung, South Korea

달월; Darwol
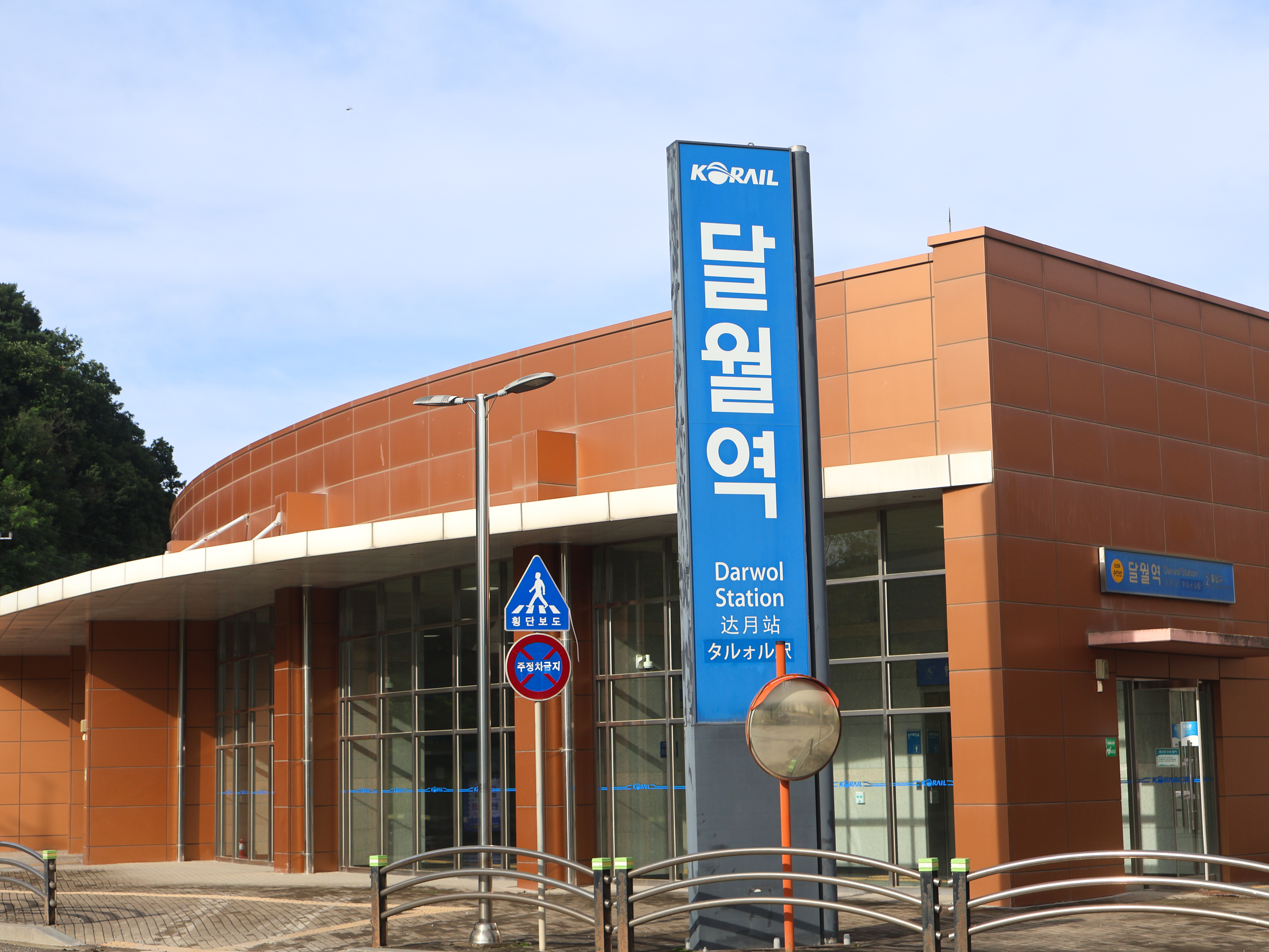

Korean name
- Hangul: 달월역
- Hanja: 達月驛
- Revised Romanization: Darwol-yeok
- McCune–Reischauer: Tarwŏl-yŏk

General information
- Location: Siheung
- Coordinates: 37.3801°N 126.7454°E
- Operator: Korail
- Line: Suin–Bundang Line
- Platforms: 2
- Tracks: 2

Construction
- Structure type: Aboveground

Key dates
- December 27, 2014: Suin–Bundang Line opened
Location

Darwol Station is a railroad station on the Suin–Bundang Line of the Seoul Metropolitan Subway in Siheung, Gyeonggi Province, South Korea. It opened on 27 December 2014.

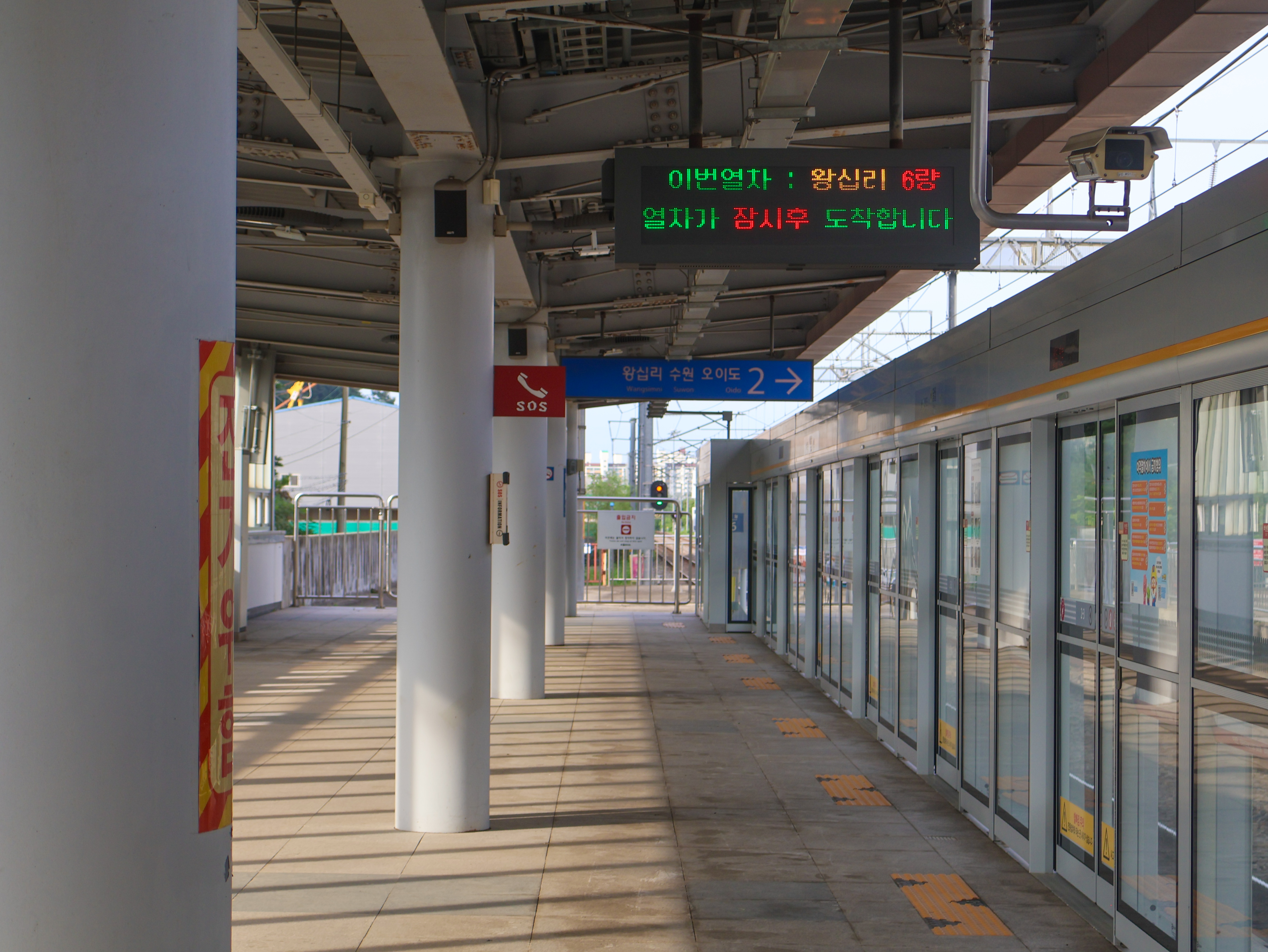
Platform

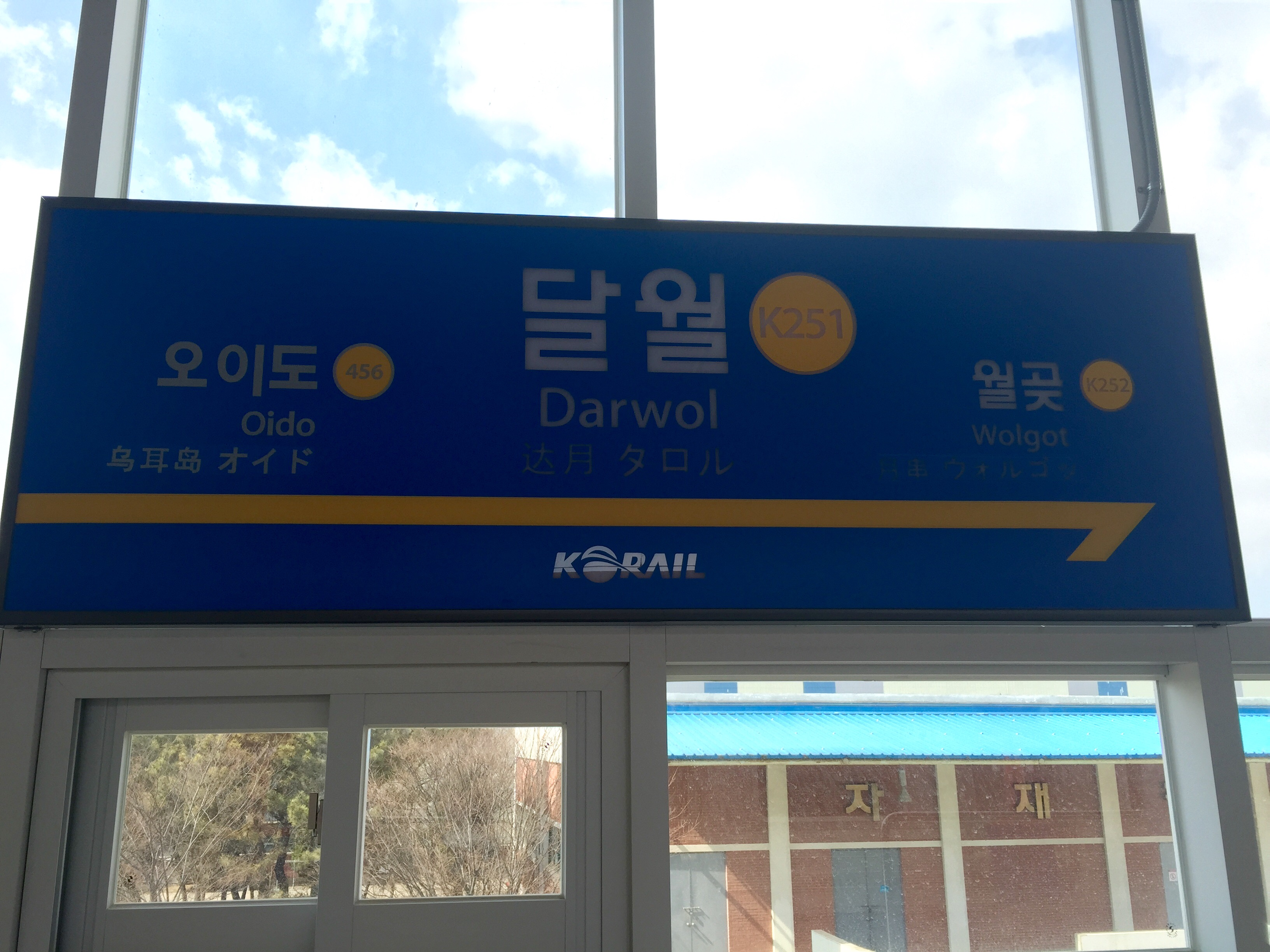
Station name sign

== History ==
May 1, 1965: Opened as an unmanned station.

October 25, 1988: Distance chart revised (Suwon starting point 36.1 km → 35.5 km)

September 1, 1994: Station closed with the closure of the Songdo - Handaeap section

November 21, 2013: Construction of the subway station began

December 13, 2014: Reopened as a subway station

December 27, 2014: Passenger trains resumed stopping.

July 20, 2015: Designated as an unmanned station

May 29, 2020: Starting point and distance revised according to the revised railway distance chart. (33.8km from Suwon)

September 12, 2020: The Suwon-Oido section opened, allowing direct service with the Bundang Line.

September 12, 2020: The station number changed to K259 with the opening of the Suin-Bundang Line.

Preceding station	Seoul Metropolitan Subway	Following station
Oido towards Cheongnyangni	Suin–Bundang Line	Wolgot towards Incheon
