= Bojeong station =

Metro station in Yongin, South Korea

보정; Bojeong
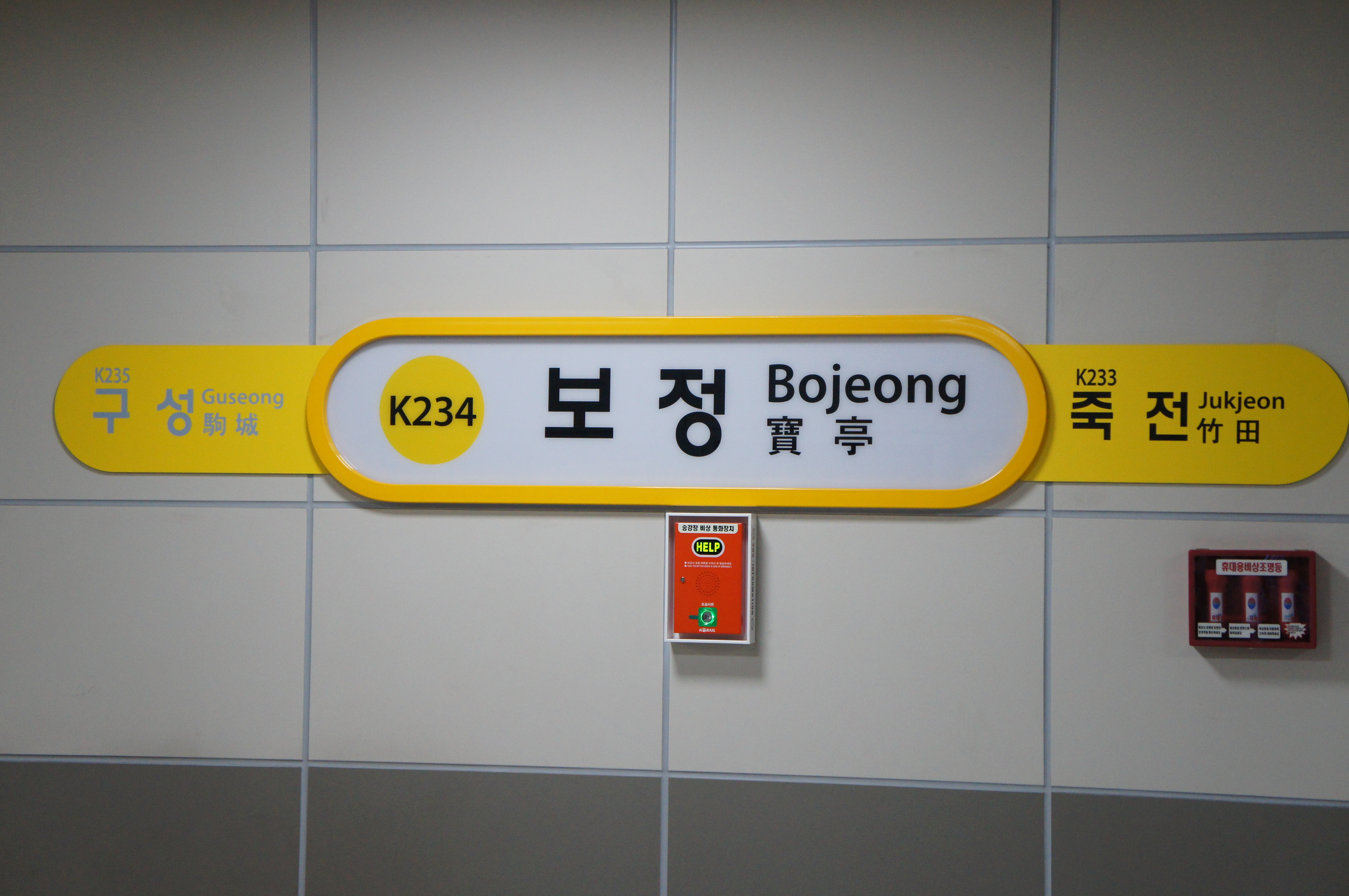
- Station nameplate

Korean name
- Hangul: 보정역
- Hanja: 寶亭驛
- Revised Romanization: Bojeongnyeok
- McCune–Reischauer: Pojŏngnyŏk

General information
- Location: 568 Bojeong-dong, 2585 Yonggudaero, Giheung-gu, Yongin-si, Gyeonggi-do
- Coordinates: 37°18′58″N 127°06′28″E
- Operator: Korail
- Line: Suin–Bundang Line
- Platforms: 2
- Tracks: 2

Construction
- Structure type: Underground

History
- Rebuilt: December 2011 (underground platforms)

Key dates
- November 26, 2004: Suin–Bundang Line opened
Location

Bojeong station (Korean: 보정역) is a station of the Suin–Bundang Line. It is located in the train depot in the far northern end of Yongin, South Korea. It was built in order to relieve traffic congestion in the suburbs of Yongin, with the city bearing most of the construction costs. The current aboveground platform is non-operative. The new Bojeong Station, which opened in December 2011, is further south of the old terminal and underground.

Preceding station	Seoul Metropolitan Subway	Following station
Jukjeon towards Cheongnyangni	Suin–Bundang Line	Guseong towards Incheon
