= Bundang Line =

Subway line in South Korea

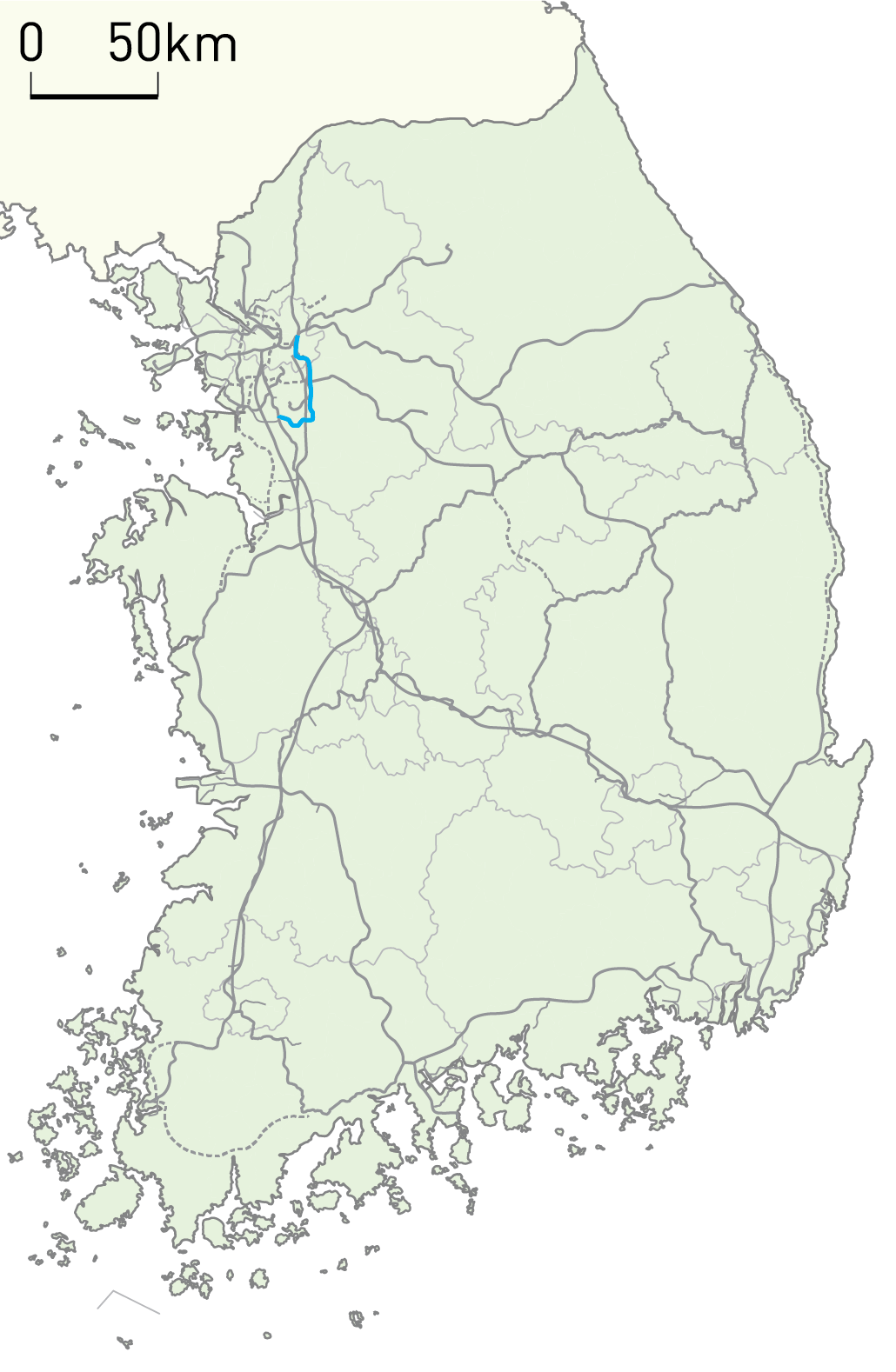

Overview
- Native name: 분당선 (盆唐線); Bundangseon
- Status: Operational
- Line number: 318
- Termini: Wangsimni; Suwon
- Stations: 36

Service
- Type: Commuter rail
- System: Seoul Metropolitan Subway
- Operator: Korail

History
- Opened: 1 September 1994

Technical
- Line length: 52.9 km (32.9 mi)
- Num of tracks: 2
- Track gauge: 1,435 mm (4 ft 8 1/2 in) standard gauge
- Operating speed: from 30 to 50 km/h (20 to 30 mph) (longer distances between certain stations)

The Bundang Line or Seoul Metropolitan Subway Bundang Line (Sudogwon Jeoncheol Bundangseon Korean: 수도권 전철 분당선) was a commuter rail line of the Seoul Metropolitan Subway in the Seoul Capital Area operated by Korail. Also it refers physical railway track from Wangsimni to Suwon which is designated by MOLIT. The name 'Bundang Line' refers to the fact that the line was originally constructed for the new planned town of Bundang. The line service started in central eastern Seoul at Cheongnyangni, crossing Gangnam District and connecting the cities of Seongnam and Yongin, and terminates at Suwon Station. While the track 'Bundang Line' designated by MOLIT is from Wangsimni to Suwon.

== Service ==
Seoul Metropolitan Subway Bundang Line
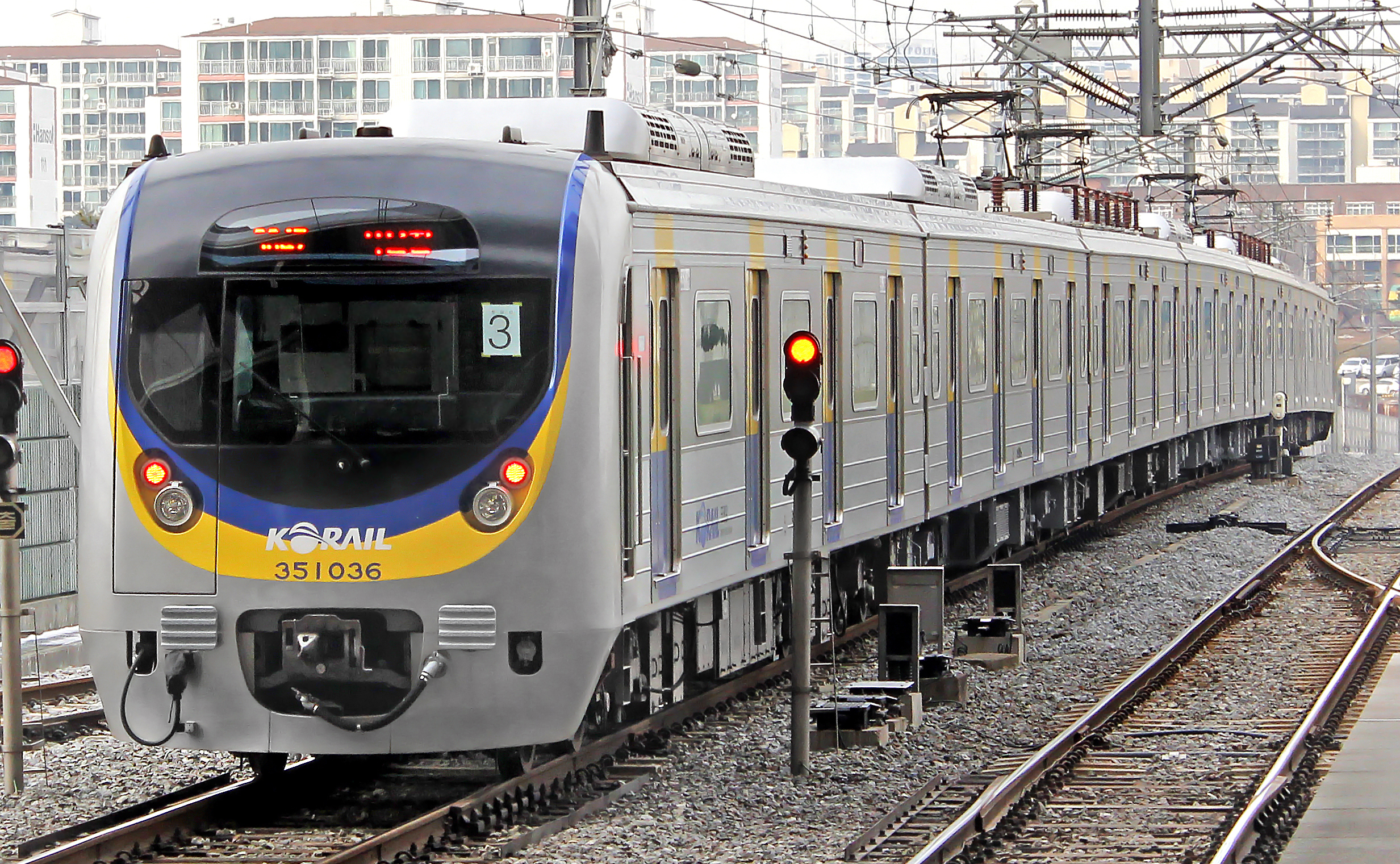

Overview
- Native name: 수도권 전철 분당선; Sudogwon Jeoncheol Bundangseon
- Status: As a part of Suin–Bundang Line
- Termini: Cheongnyangni; Suwon
- Stations: 37

Trains ran every 4~5 minutes during rush hours and every 7~8 minutes during off peak hours between Wangsimni and Jukjeon. Trains run at half the frequency between Jukjeon and Suwon, except during rush hours.

Most northbound trains terminated at Wangsimni. Some northbound trains continued one stop to Cheongnyangni, and the last few trains in the evening from Suwon terminated at Jukjeon. Half of all southbound trains head to Suwon, and the other half short-turn at Jukjeon. Express train service stopped at all stops between Wangsimni and Jukjeon, and thereafter at Giheung, Mangpo, Suwon City Hall and Suwon. The express service only operated during rush hours on weekdays.

== History ==
1994	September 1	The Bundang Line is officially opened from Suseo to Ori.
2003	September 3	The line is extended northward from Suseo to Seolleung.
2004	January 16	Imae Station opens as an in-fill station.
2004	September 24	Guryong Station opens as an in-fill station.
2004	November 26	A temporary Bojeong Station opens near the Bundang Line Train Depot, south of Ori.
2007	December 24	Jukjeon Station opens as an in-fill station.
2011	December 28	The line is extended southward from Jukjeon to Giheung. The temporary Bojeong Station is replaced with a new underground station, also called Bojeong.
2012	October 6	The line is extended northward from Seolleung to Wangsimni.
2012	December 1	The line is extended southward from Giheung to Mangpo.
2013	November 30	The line is extended westward from Mangpo to Suwon was opened, allowing for connections to Line 1. Express service was launched.
2018	December 31	The line is extended northeastward to Cheongnyangni station, allowing for connections to the Gyeongchun Line and regional rail services.
2020	September 12	The service was extended westward from Suwon to Oido, merging with the Suin Line, forming the Suin–Bundang Line. Trains will run from Cheongnyangni station or Wangsimni station to Jukjeon station, Gosaek station, or Incheon station.

== Stations ==
The negative sign is only a convention for distance notation from Wangsimni Station, the terminus of most services.

Station; Number	Station; Name; English	Station; Name; Hangul	Station; Name; Hanja	Transfer	Distance in km	Total; Distance	Location		
K209	Cheongnyangni	청량리	淸凉里	Mugunghwa-ho and ITX-Saemaeul services	—	-2.4	Seoul	Dongdaemun-gu	
K210	Wangsimni	왕십리	往十里	Gyeongui–Jungang Line	2.4	0.0	Seoul	Seongdong-gu	
K211	Seoul Forest	서울숲	서울숲		2.2	2.2	Seoul	Seongdong-gu	
K212	Apgujeongrodeo	압구정로데오	狎鷗亭 로데오		1.9	4.1	Seoul	Gangnam-gu	
K213	Gangnam-gu; Office	강남구청	江南區廳	Seoul Subway Line 7	1.2	5.3	Seoul	Gangnam-gu	
K214	Seonjeongneung	선정릉	宣靖陵	Seoul Subway Line 9	0.7	6.0	Seoul	Gangnam-gu	
K215	Seolleung	선릉	宣陵	Seoul Subway Line 2	0.7	6.7	Seoul	Gangnam-gu	
K216	Hanti	한티	한티		1.0	7.7	Seoul	Gangnam-gu	
K217	Dogok	도곡	道谷	Seoul Subway Line 3	0.7	8.4	Seoul	Gangnam-gu	
K218	Guryong	구룡	九龍		0.6	9.0	Seoul	Gangnam-gu	
K219	Gaepo-dong	개포동	開浦洞		0.7	9.7	Seoul	Gangnam-gu	
K220	Daemosan	대모산 입구	大母山入口		0.6	10.3	Seoul	Gangnam-gu	
K221	Suseo	수서	水西	Suseo HSR	3.0	13.3	Seoul	Gangnam-gu	
K222	Bokjeong	복정	福井	Seoul Subway Line 8	3.2	16.5	Seoul	Songpa-gu	
K223	Gachon University	가천대	嘉泉大		2.4	18.9	Gyeonggi -do	Seongnam -si	Sujeong -gu
K224	Taepyeong	태평	太平		1.0	19.9	Gyeonggi -do	Seongnam -si	Sujeong -gu
K225	Moran	모란	牡丹	Seoul Subway Line 8	0.9	20.8	Gyeonggi -do	Seongnam -si	Jungwon -gu
K226	Yatap	야탑	野塔		2.3	23.1	Gyeonggi -do	Seongnam -si	Bundang -gu
K227	Imae	이매	二梅	Gyeonggang Line	1.7	24.8	Gyeonggi -do	Seongnam -si	Bundang -gu
K228	Seohyeon	서현	書峴		1.4	26.2	Gyeonggi -do	Seongnam -si	Bundang -gu
K229	Sunae	수내	藪內		1.1	27.3	Gyeonggi -do	Seongnam -si	Bundang -gu
K230	Jeongja	정자	亭子	Shinbundang Line	1.6	28.9	Gyeonggi -do	Seongnam -si	Bundang -gu
K231	Migeum	미금	美金	Shinbundang Line	1.8	30.7	Gyeonggi -do	Seongnam -si	Bundang -gu
K232	Ori	오리	梧里		1.1	31.8	Gyeonggi -do	Seongnam -si	Bundang -gu
K233	Jukjeon	죽전	竹田		1.8	33.6	Gyeonggi -do	Yongin -si	Suji-gu
K234	Bojeong	보정	寶亭		1.3	34.9	Gyeonggi -do	Yongin -si	Giheung -gu
K235	Guseong	구성	駒城		1.6	36.5	Gyeonggi -do	Yongin -si	Giheung -gu
K236	Singal	신갈	新葛		1.6	38.1	Gyeonggi -do	Yongin -si	Giheung -gu
K237	Giheung	기흥	器興	Everline	1.4	39.5	Gyeonggi -do	Yongin -si	Giheung -gu
K238	Sanggal	상갈	上葛		1.9	41.4	Gyeonggi -do	Yongin -si	Giheung -gu
K239	Cheongmyeong	청명	淸明		2.8	44.2	Gyeonggi -do	Suwon -si	Yeongtong -gu
K240	Yeongtong	영통	靈通		1.1	45.3	Gyeonggi -do	Suwon -si	Yeongtong -gu
K241	Mangpo	망포	網浦		1.5	46.8	Gyeonggi -do	Suwon -si	Yeongtong -gu
K242	MaetanGwonseon	매탄권선	梅灘勸善		1.8	48.6	Gyeonggi -do	Suwon -si	Yeongtong -gu
K243	Suwon City Hall	수원시청	水原市廳		1.4	50.0	Gyeonggi -do	Suwon -si	Gwonseon -gu
K244	Maegyo	매교	梅橋		1.4	51.4	Gyeonggi -do	Suwon -si	Paldal -gu
K245	Suwon	수원	水原	Mugunghwa-ho, Saemaeul-ho, and ITX-Saemaeul services	1.5	52.9	Gyeonggi -do	Suwon -si	Paldal -gu
↓ Through-services to/from Incheon via Suin Line (Suin–Bundang Line) ↓

== Rolling Stock ==
The Bundang Line used 43 Korail Class 351000 trains. Earlier trains were originally the same models used on Line 4, as they were all originally classified as Class 2000 trains. First generation trains (351-01~351-22) were introduced since the line's opening, second generation trains (351-23~351-28) were introduced when the Bundang Line was extended from Suseo to Seolleung in 2003, and third generation trains (351-29~351-43) were introduced as more extensions open.

== See also ==
- Bundang-gu
- Rapid transit in South Korea
- Korail
- Seoul Metropolitan Subway
