= Jukjeon-dong =

- Hangul: 죽전동
- Hanja: 竹田洞
- RR: Jukjeon-dong
- MR: Chukchŏn-dong

Jukjeon-dong may refer to:

- Jukjeon-dong, Daegu, a dong in Dalseo District, Daegu city, South Korea
- Jukjeon-dong, Yongin, a dong in Suji-gu, Yongin city, Gyeonggi Province, South Korea
- Jukjeon-dong, Sangju, a dong in Sangju city, North Gyeongsang Province, South Korea
