= Pungdeokcheon-dong =

Area of Suji-gu in Yongin, South Korea

- Hangul: 풍덕천동
- Hanja: 豊德川洞
- RR: Pungdeokcheon-dong
- MR: P'ungdŏkch'ŏn-dong

Pungdeokcheon-dong is a dong located in Suji-gu, Yongin, South Korea.

== Education ==
=== Elementary schools ===
- Yongin Pungdeok Elementary School

=== Middle schools ===
- Suji Middle School

=== High schools ===
- Suji High School
