= Dongcheon-dong =

Dongcheon-dong may refer to various places in South Korea:

- Dongcheon-dong, Daegu
- Dongcheon-dong, Gyeongju
- Dongcheon-dong, Yongin
