= Mangpo station =

Metro station in Suwon, South Korea

망포; Mangpo
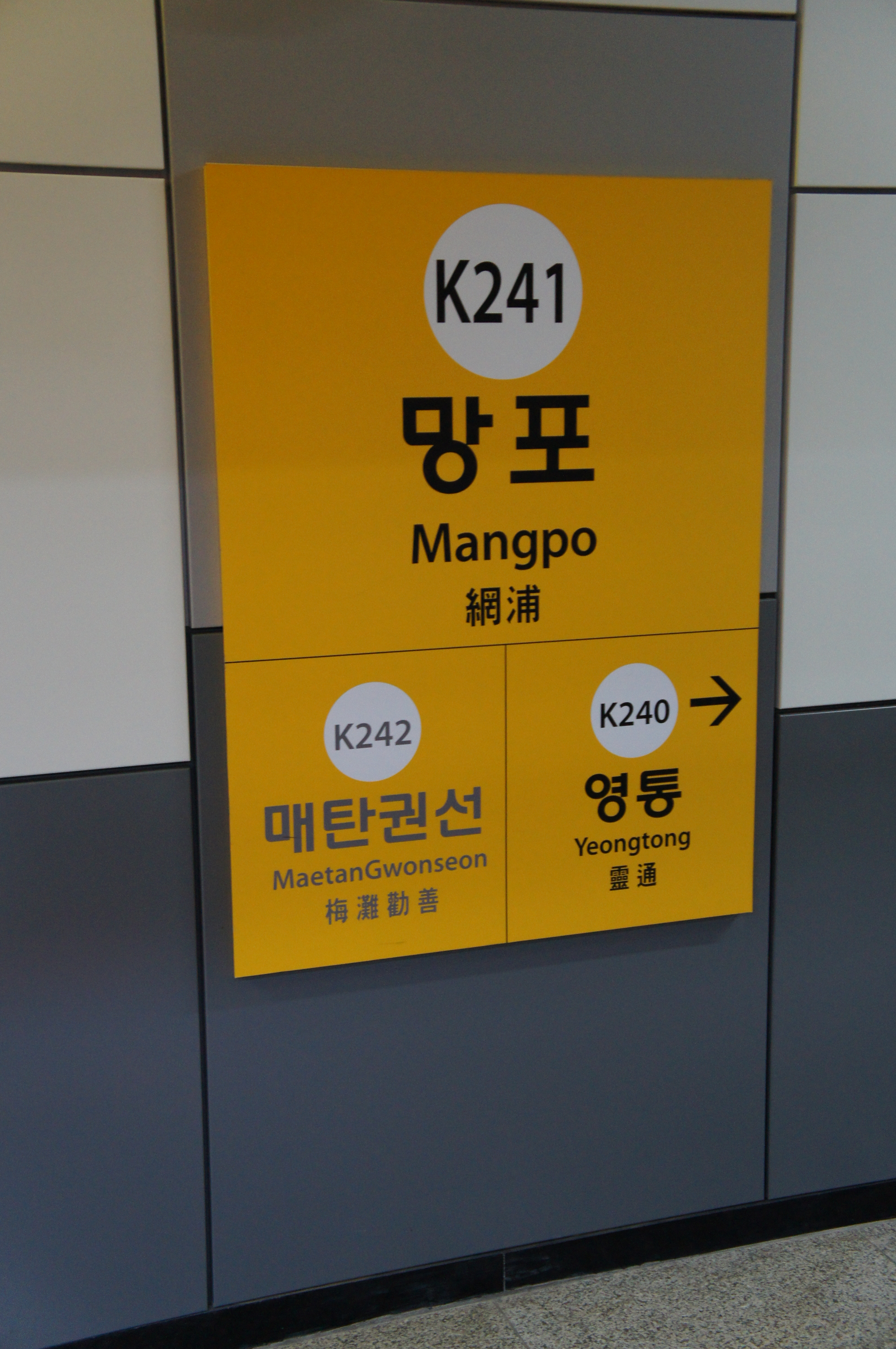

Korean name
- Hangul: 망포역
- Hanja: 網浦驛
- Revised Romanization: Mangpo-yeok
- McCune–Reischauer: Mangp'o-yŏk

General information
- Location: Jiha1520, Deogyeong-daero, Yeongtong-gu, Suwon-si, Gyeonggi-do
- Coordinates: 37.245799°N 127.057364°E
- Operator: Korail
- Line: Suin–Bundang Line
- Platforms: 2
- Tracks: 4

Construction
- Structure type: Underground

Key dates
- December 1, 2012: Suin–Bundang Line opened
Location

Mangpo Station is a subway station of the Suin–Bundang Line, the commuter subway line of Korail, the national railway of South Korea.

== History ==
The station was opened in December 2012, as part of the Mangpo extension of the Bundang Line. In 2013, since the Bundang Line was extended to Suwon station, it hasn't been a terminal station. After the Suin Line and the Bundang Line connected and started services together, it became a station of the Suin–Bundang Line.

Preceding station	Seoul Metropolitan Subway	Following station
Yeongtong towards Cheongnyangni	Suin–Bundang Line	MaetanGwonseon towards Incheon
Giheung towards Wangsimni	Suin–Bundang Line Bundang Express Line	Suwon City Hall towards Gosaek
