= Sanggal station =

Metro station in Yongin, South Korea

상갈 (루터대학교); Sanggal (Luther Univ.)
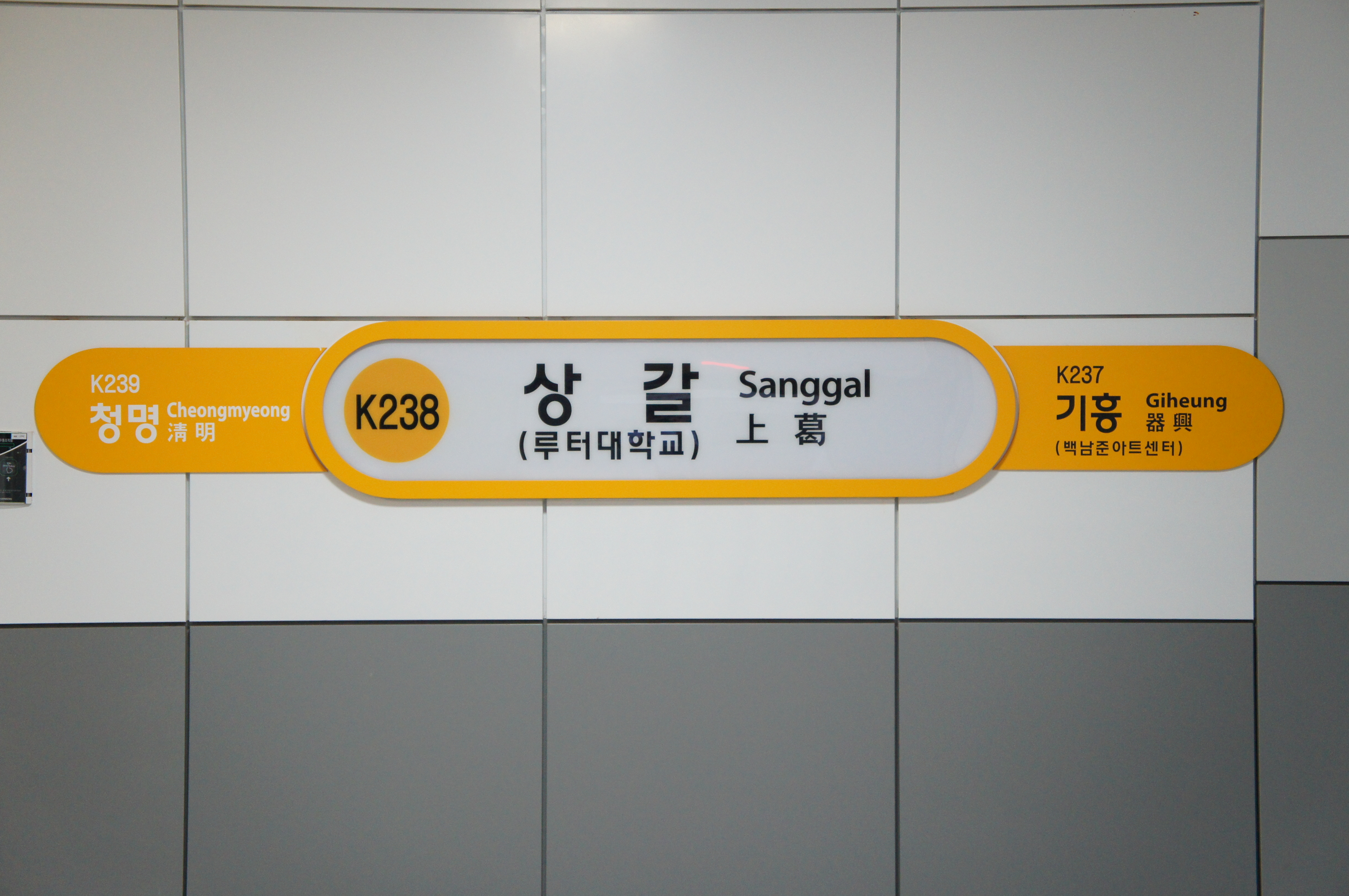
- Station sign

Korean name
- Hangul: 상갈역
- Hanja: 上葛驛
- Revised Romanization: Sanggallyeok
- McCune–Reischauer: Sanggallyŏk

General information
- Location: 29 Sanggal-dong, Giheung-gu, Yongin-si, Gyeonggi-do
- Coordinates: 37.261797°N 127.108718°E
- Operator: Korail
- Line: Suin–Bundang Line
- Platforms: 2
- Tracks: 2

Construction
- Structure type: Underground

Key dates
- December 1, 2012: Suin–Bundang Line opened
Location

Sanggal station is a subway station of the Suin–Bundang Line, the commuter subway line of Korail, the national railway of South Korea.

The station was opened in December 2012, as part of the Mangpo extension of the Bundang Line.

Preceding station	Seoul Metropolitan Subway	Following station
Giheung towards Cheongnyangni	Suin–Bundang Line	Cheongmyeong towards Incheon
