= Jukjeon-dong, Yongin =

Jukjeon-dong
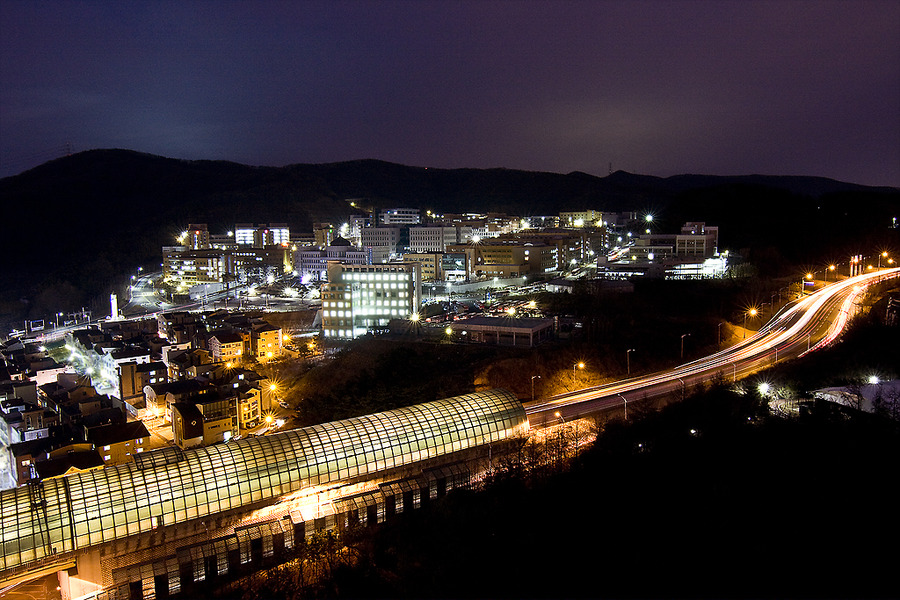
- A night view of Dankook University, located in Jukjeon
- Country: South Korea

Area
  - Total: 5.53 km^{2} (2.14 sq mi)

Population (2008)
  - Total: 86,644
  - Density: 15,700/km^{2} (40,600/sq mi)

Korean name
- Hangul: 죽전동
- Hanja: 竹田洞
- RR: Jukjeon-dong
- MR: Chukchŏn-dong

Jukjeon-dong (Korean: 죽전동) is a dong in Suji-gu of Yongin city. Jukjeon was divided into Jukjeon 1-dong and Jukjeon 2-dong on December 24, 2001, when Suji-eup was promoted into Suji-gu. Jukjeon borders Seongnam city to the north, Mohyeon-Eup of Cheoin-gu to the east, and Giheung-gu to the south. Tancheon flows through the neighborhood, with west of the stream classified as Jukjeon 1-dong and the east of it classified as Jukjeon 2-dong. Jeongpyeongcheon, a stream, also flows into Tancheon at Jukjeon. Along the banks of Tancheon are small parks and paths for walkers and cyclists.

Apartments overwhelmingly outnumber individual houses in number as a result of relatively little urban planning compared to Bundang or Pangyo, Seongnam. There are a few luxury townhouse complexes located in the Greater Jukjeon Area (죽전지구), but they actually belong to Bojeong-dong of Giheung-gu.

The main campus Dankook University is located in Jukjeon. As a result, Jukjeon Station is also called Dankook University Station.

== Commerce ==
About 250 stores in Jukjeon Fashion Town attract people from all over Korea and even tourists from China or Taiwan. It began forming just before the 1997 Asian financial crisis and now houses seven separate districts within itself. it is located along Seongnam-daero from Ori Station to Jukjeon intersection.

The Gyeonggi Branch (경기점) of Shinsegae Department Store is located in Jukjeon. It houses CGV, a movie theater chain, and is attached to Starfield Market Jukjeon Branch and Bundang Line's Jukjeon Station.

== Education ==
=== Elementary School ===
- Daedeok Elementary School
- Daeil Elementary School
- Daeji Elementary School
- Hyeongam Elementary School
- Daecheong Elementary School
- Daehyeon Elementary School
- Sinchon Elementary School
- Jukjeon Elementary School

=== Middle School ===
- Yongin Daedeok Middle School
- Daedeok Middle School
- Yongin Jukjeon Middle School
- Hyeongam Middle School

=== High Schools ===
- Jukjeon High School
- Daeji High School
- Hyeonam High School

=== Universities ===
- Dankook University (Main campus)

== Transportation ==
=== Subway ===
- Bundang Line - Jukjeon Station (Also called : Dankook University Station)

=== Buses ===
Dosihyeong, (도시형, city type buses)

- ● 27
- ● 27–5
- ● 60
- ● 67
- ● 67–1
- ● 68
- ● 101
- ● 116
- ● 116–1
- ● 116–3
- ● 390
- ● 660
- ● 690
- ● 720–2
- ● 720–3
- ● 820
- ● 1116

Jwaseok (좌석, express buses)

- ● 102
- ● 1005–1
- ● 1005–2
- ● 1303
- ● 1500–3
- ● 2002–1
- ● 2003
- ● 5500–1
- ● 7007–1
- ● 8100
- ● 8101
- ● 8251
- ● 9001
- ● 9404
- ● 9409
- ● 9414

== Sub-divisions ==
1-dong on the west side of Tancheon and 2-dong on the east side of Tancheon
