= Suwon station =

Metro station in Suwon, South Korea

수원
Suwon
수원; Suwon
수원; Suwon
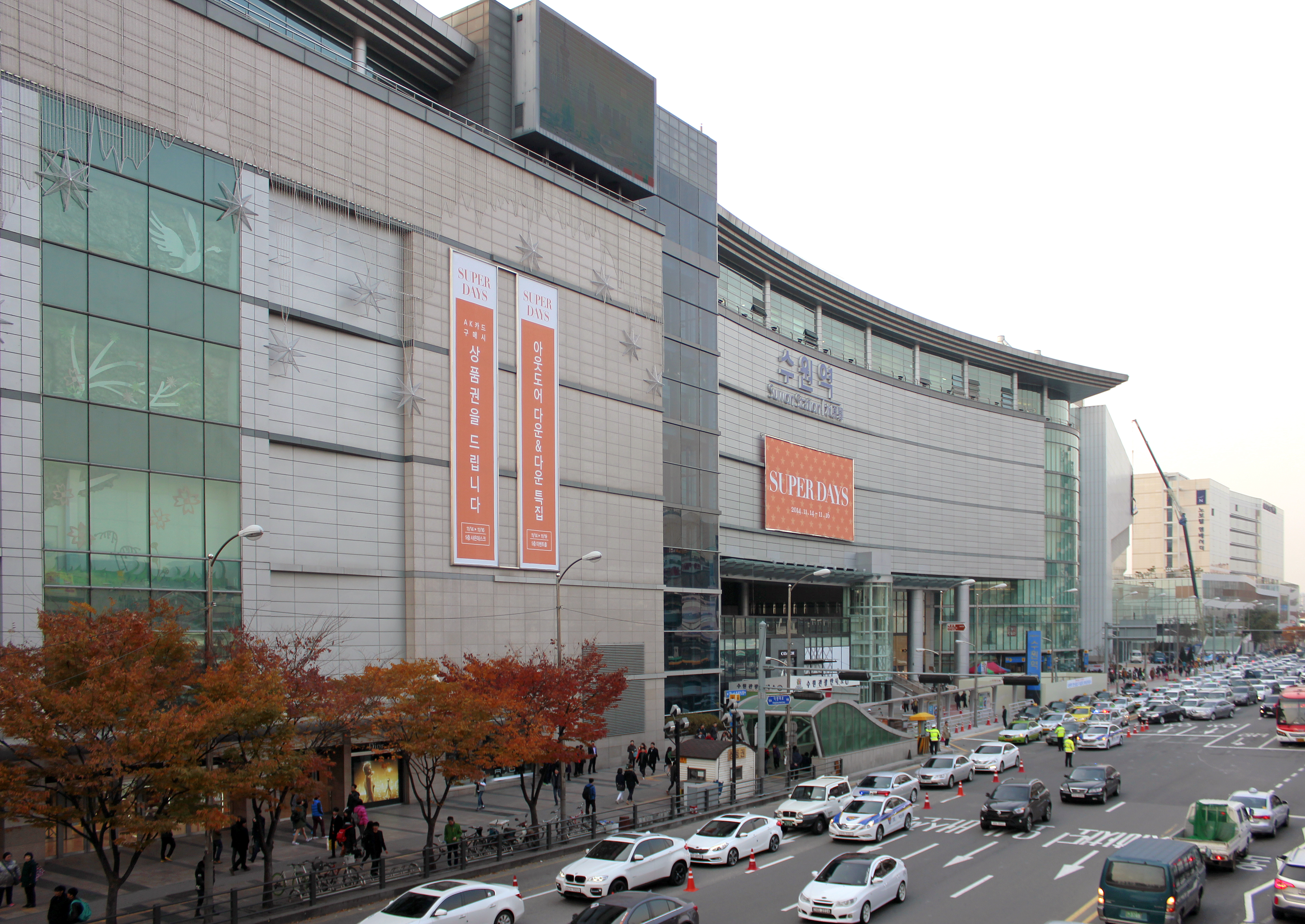

Korean name
- Hangul: 수원역
- Hanja: 水原驛
- RR: Suwon-yeok
- MR: Suwŏn-yŏk

General information
- Location: 18 Maesanro 1-ga, 924 Deogyeongdaero, Paldal-gu, Suwon-si; Gyeonggi-do; South Korea
- Coordinates: 37°15′58″N 126°59′59″E
- Operator: Korail
- Lines: Gyeongbu Line: Line 1 Suin–Bundang Line
- Platforms: 6
- Tracks: 10
- Connections: Bus stop

Construction
- Structure type: Ground (Line 1, Gyeongbu Line); Underground (Suin–Bundang Line)

Other information
- Station code: P155 (Line 1); K245 (Suin–Bundang Line)

History
- Opened: January 1, 1905

Key dates
- August 15, 1974: Line 1 opened
- November 30, 2013: Suin–Bundang Line opened

Passengers
- (Daily) Based on 2019.: SMS: 112,319; KTX·ITX-Saemaeul·Mugunghwa-ho: 36,987

Services
Preceding station	Seoul Metropolitan Subway	Following station
Hwaseo towards Kwangwoon University	Line 1	Seryu towards Seodongtan or Sinchang
Sungkyunkwan University towards Cheongnyangni or Seoul	Line 1 Gyeongbu Express	Byeongjeom towards Sinchang
Maegyo towards Cheongnyangni	Suin–Bundang Line	Gosaek towards Incheon
Suwon City Hall towards Wangsimni	Suin–Bundang Line Bundang Express Line	Gosaek Terminus
Other services
Preceding station	Korea Train Express	Following station
Yeongdeungpo towards Seoul	Gyeongbu KTX	Daejeon towards Busan
Preceding station	Korail	Following station
Anyang towards Seoul	ITX-Saemaeul Gyeongbu Line	Osan towards Busan
Yeongdeungpo towards Seoul	ITX-Saemaeul Gyeongjeon Line	Pyeongtaek towards Jinju
Yeongdeungpo towards Yongsan	ITX-Saemaeul Honam Line	Osan towards Mokpo
Yeongdeungpo towards Yongsan	ITX-Saemaeul Gwangju Line	Pyeongtaek towards Gwangju
Yeongdeungpo towards Yongsan	ITX-Saemaeul Jeolla Line	Pyeongtaek towards Yeosu-Expo
Yeongdeungpo towards Seoul	ITX-Maum Gyeongbu Line	Pyeongtaek towards Busan
Yeongdeungpo towards Seoul	ITX-Maum Gyeongbu Line via Seojeong-ri	Seojeong-ri towards Busan
Yeongdeungpo towards Yongsan	ITX-Maum Honam Line	Pyeongtaek towards Mokpo
Yeongdeungpo towards Yongsan	ITX-Maum Jeolla Line	Pyeongtaek towards Yeosu-Expo
Yeongdeungpo towards Yongsan	Saemaeul-ho Janghang Line	Pyeongtaek towards Iksan
Anyang towards Seoul	Mugunghwa-ho Gyeongbu Line	Osan towards Busan
Anyang towards Yongsan	Mugunghwa-ho Honam Line	Seojeong-ri towards Mokpo
Anyang towards Yongsan	Mugunghwa-ho Honam Line	Osan towards Gwangju
Anyang towards Seoul	Mugunghwa-ho Chungbuk Line	Osan towards Jecheon
Anyang towards Yongsan	Mugunghwa-ho Janghang Line	Pyeongtaek towards Iksan
Anyang towards Yongsan	Mugunghwa-ho Jeolla Line	Osan towards Yeosu-Expo
Yeongdeungpo towards Seoul	S-Train West	Cheonan towards Yeosu-Expo
Yeongdeungpo towards Yongsan	G-Train	Asan towards Iksan
Anyang towards Seoul	Chungbuk Yeongdong Gugak Wine Train	Pyeongtaek towards Yeongdong
Location

Suwon station is a railway station in the city of Suwon, South Korea. The station was completely redeveloped in 2002 and 2003, and is now integrated with the Aekyung Shopping Mall (AK Plaza). This station serves Inter-city railway Gyeongbu Line KTX, ITX-Saemaeul and Mugunghwa will stop. Also Line 1, Suin–Bundang Line of the Seoul subway will stop. And this station is an important hub in southern Gyeonggi Province.

== Lines ==
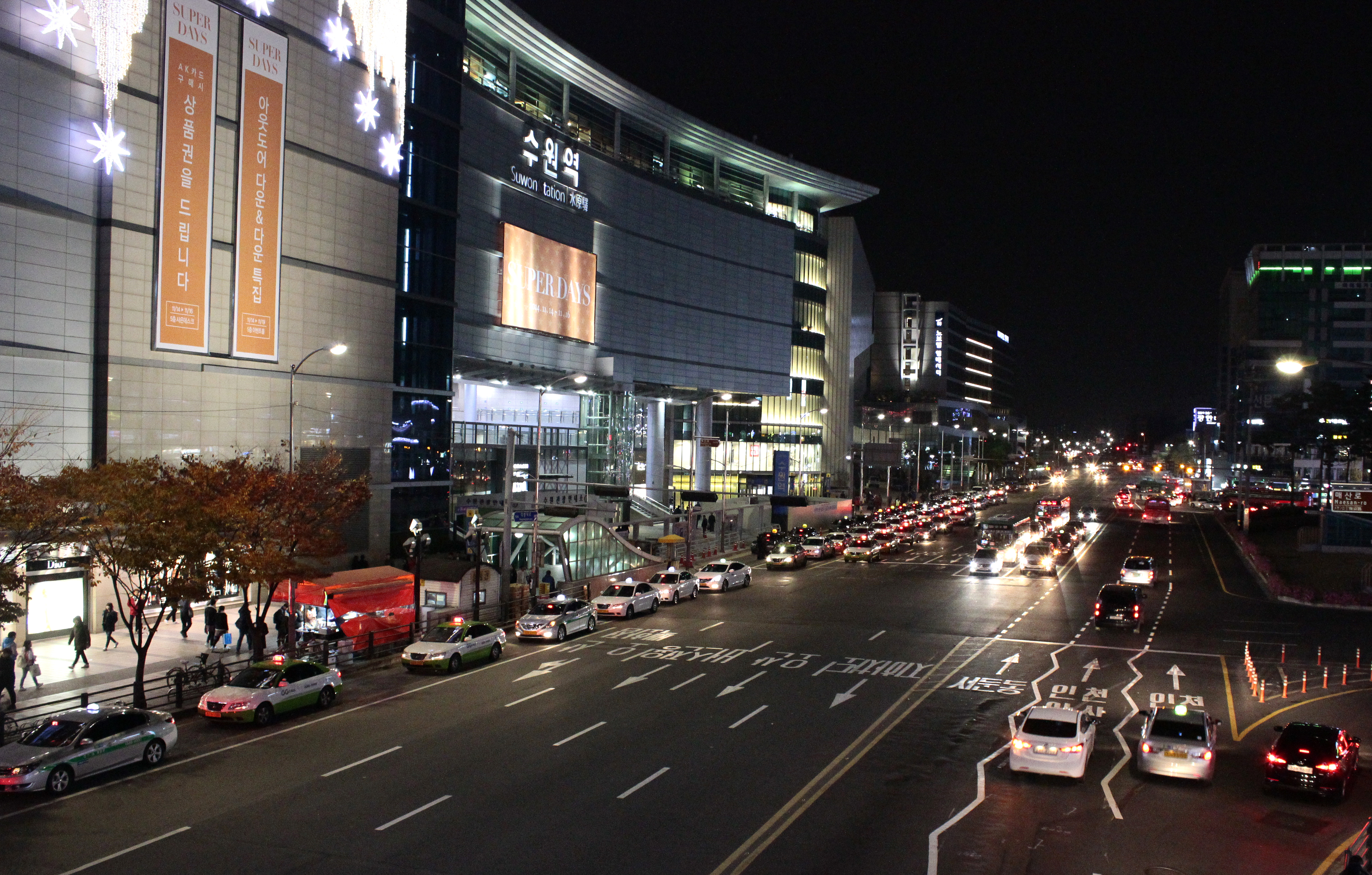
Suwon Station night view (2014)

Suwon is served by the following lines:

=== Korail ===
- Gyeongbu Line
- Line 1
- Suin–Bundang Line

== Station layout ==
=== Korail platforms ===
Seoul Subway Line 1 · Gyeongbu Line platforms (Ground)

↑Hwaseo(Line 1)/↑Anyang(Gyeongbu Line)
| | | | 98 | | 76 | | 54 | | 32 | |
Seryu(Line 1)↓/Osan(Gyeongbu Line)↓

2~3	Line 1	Line 1 Local · Express	For Byeongjeom · Seodongtan · Pyeongtaek · Cheonan · Sinchang
4~5	Gyeongbu Line		For Daejeon · Dongdaegu · Ulsan · Busan
4~5	Gyeongbu Line · Chungbuk Line	ITX-Saemaeul · Mugunghwa-ho	For Pyeongtaek · Daejeon · Busan · Jinju · Sinhaeundae · Jecheon
4~5	Honam Line · Jeolla Line · Janghang Line	ITX-Saemaeul · Saemaeul-ho · Mugunghwa-ho	For Mokpo · Gwangju · Yeosu Expo · Iksan
6~7	Gyeongbu Line		For Yeongdeungpo · Seoul
6~7	Gyeongbu Line	ITX-Saemaeul · Saemaeul-ho · Mugunghwa-ho	For Anyang · Yeongdeungpo · Yongsan · Seoul
8~9	Line 1	Line 1 Local · Express	For Sungkyunkwan Univ. · Anyang · Geumcheon-gu Office · Guro · Kwangwoon University

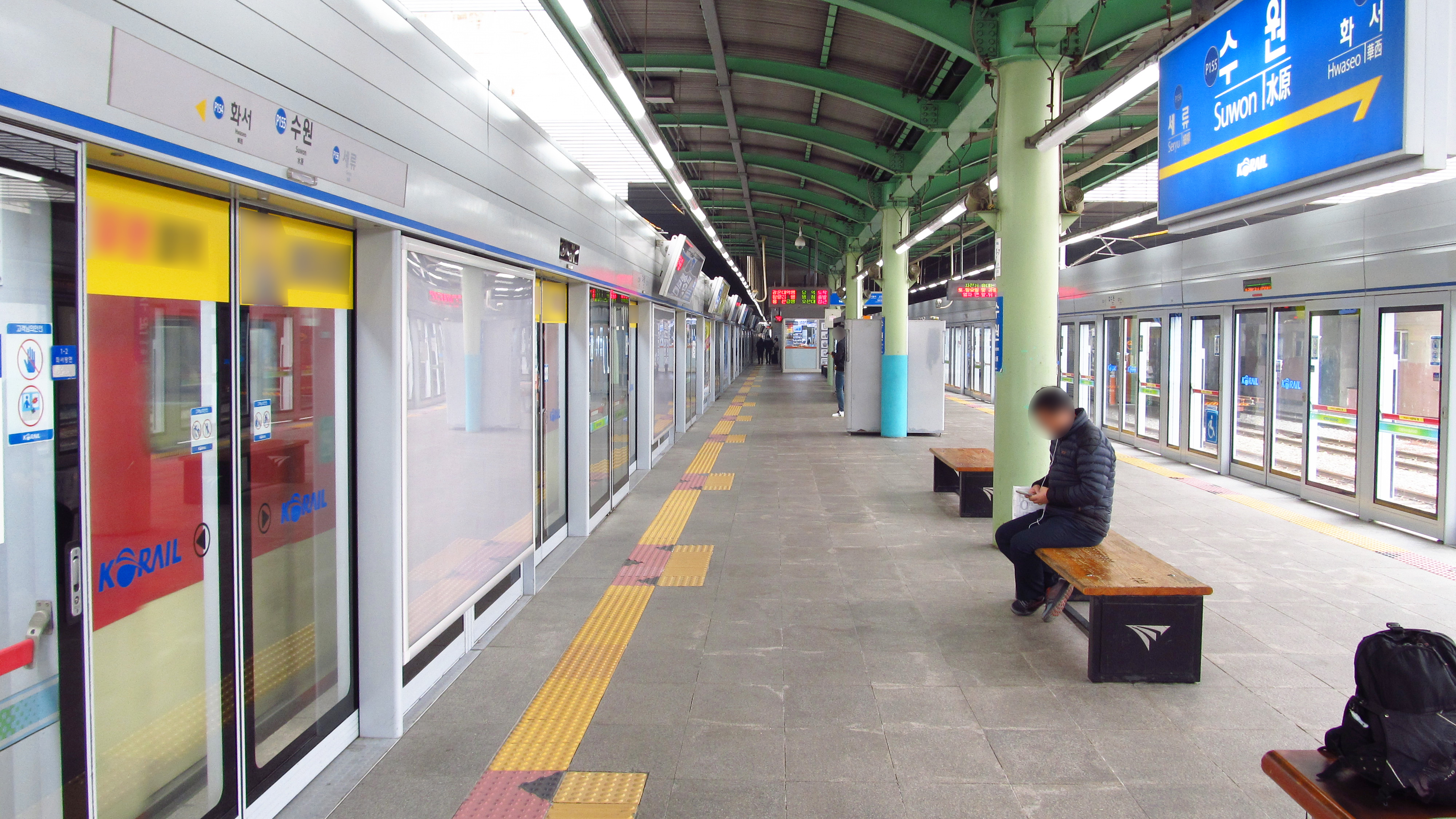
Line 1 platforms

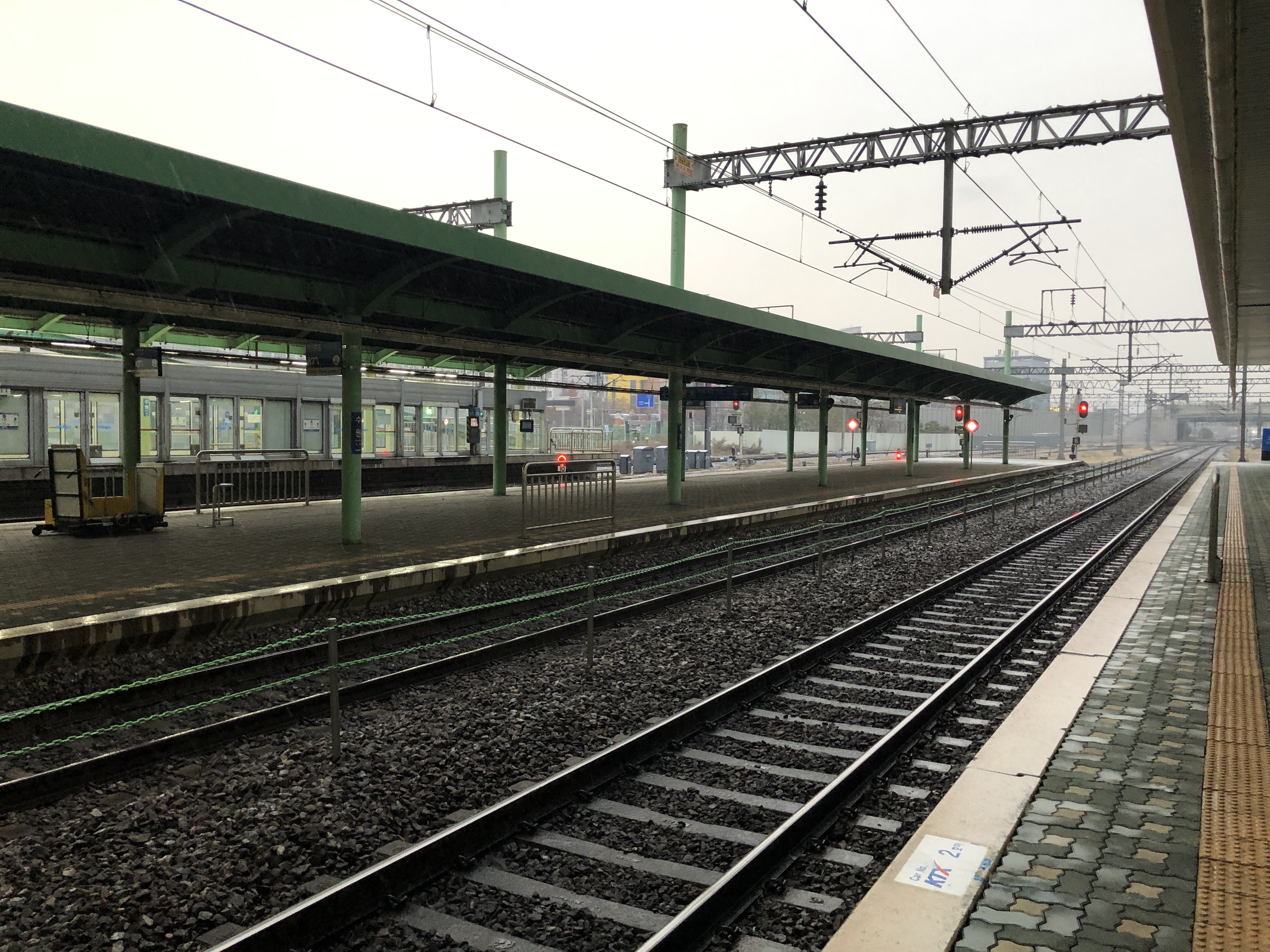
Train platforms

Suin-Bundang Line platforms (underground)

↑ Maegyo
2 | | 1
↓Gosaek

1	Suin–Bundang Line	For Eocheon · Choji · Hogupo · Yeonsu · Incheon
2	Suin–Bundang Line	For Cheongmyeong · Migeum · Sunae · Dogok · Cheongnyangni

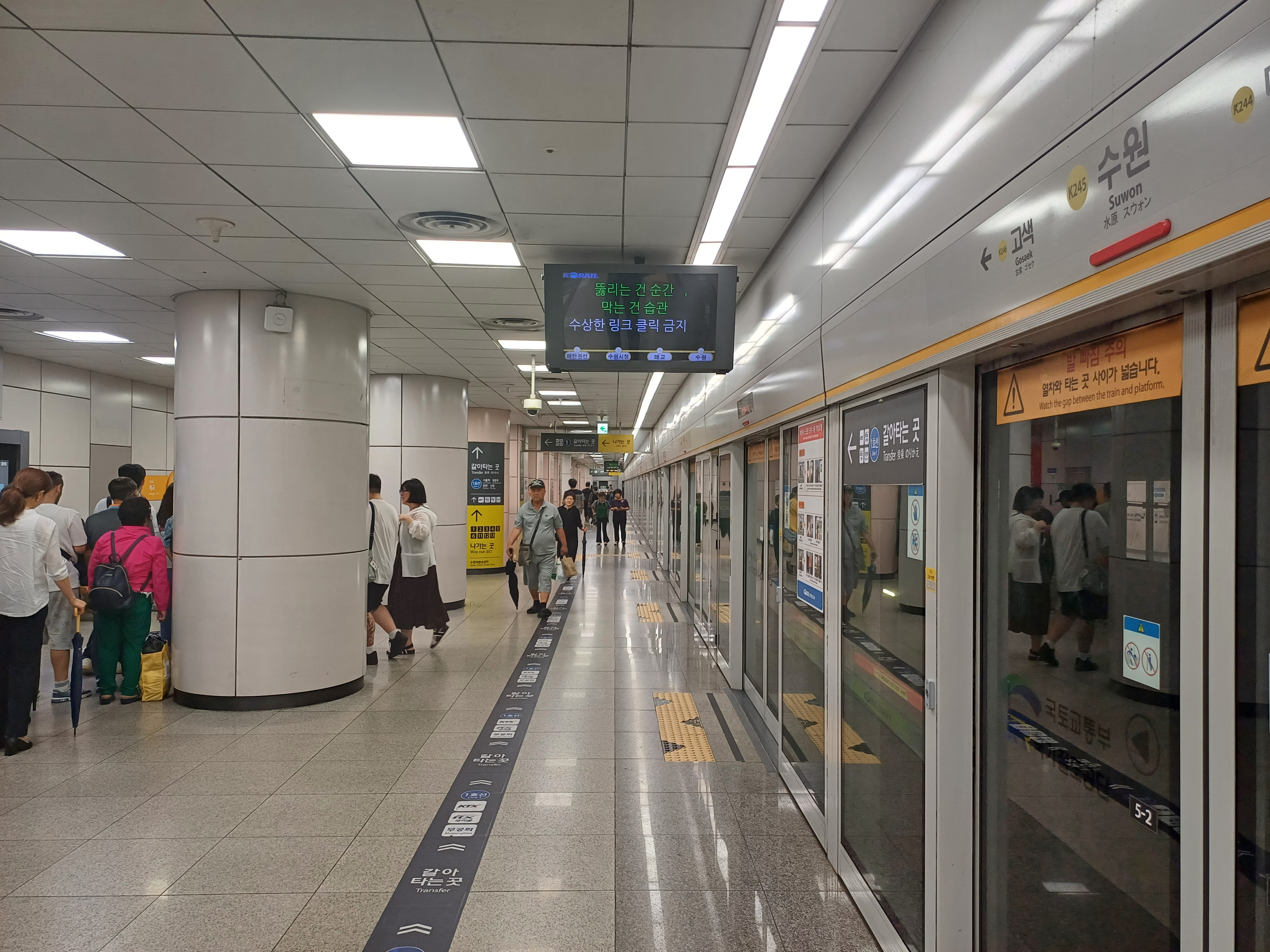
Suin-Bundang Line platforms

== History ==
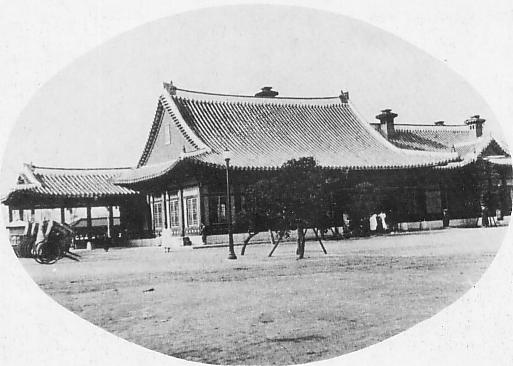
Suwon Station in the early 20th century

Suwon Station opened on January 1, 1905. On December 1, 1930, the narrow gauge Suryeo Line from Suwon to Yeoju opened. On August 6, 1937, the Suin Line from Suwon to Incheon began operating services. Over three decades later, on April 1, 1972, the Suryeo Line closed, though two years later, on December 31, 1975, the Seoul Subway began services to Suwon. The Suin Line and narrow gauge services were both terminated on January 1, 1996.

== Building ==
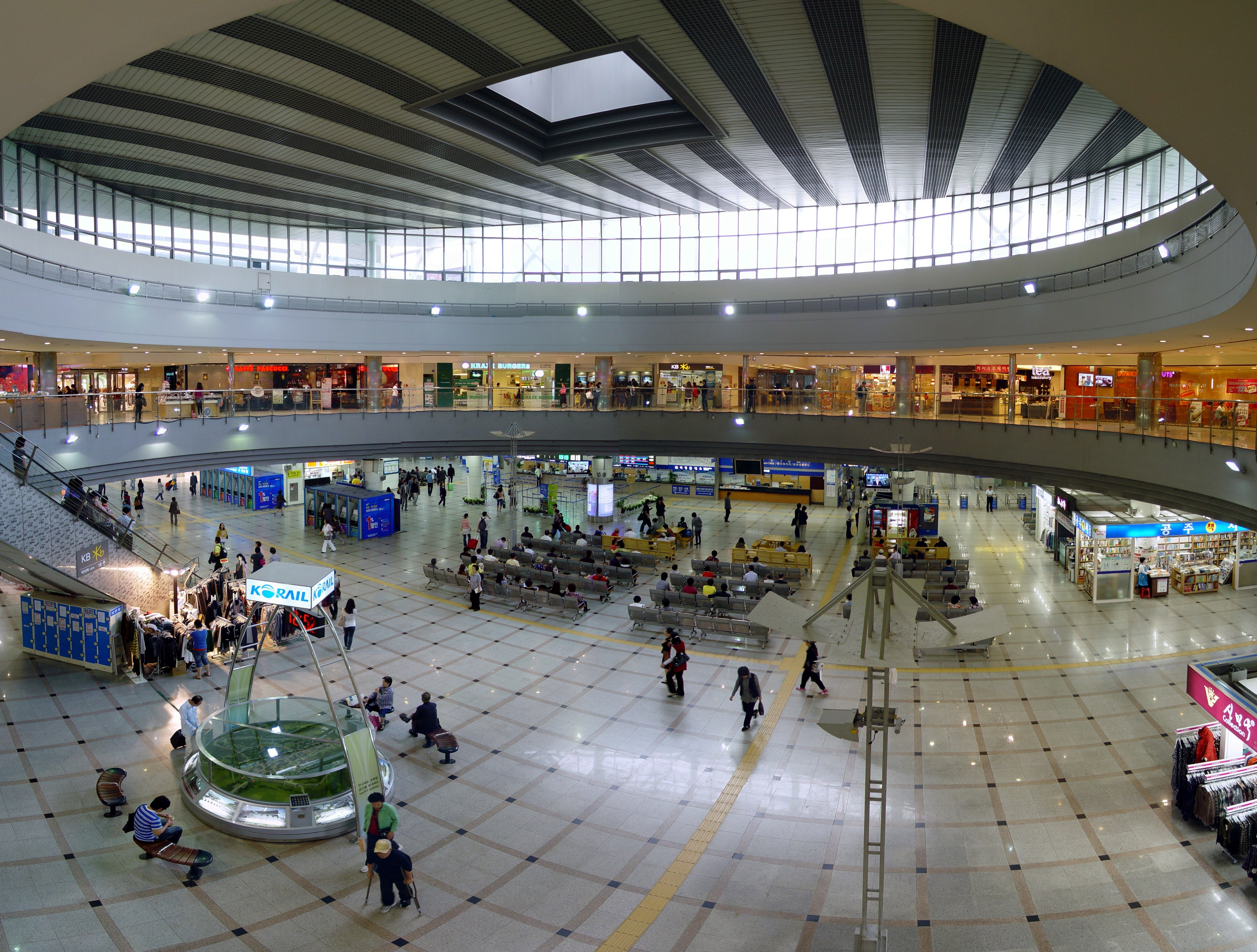
Inside Suwon Station

Suwon Station shares a building with AK Plaza. The station itself is above ground (for all services) and underground (for metro services only). There are many stores and restaurants located in the station and outside of the station. Also, there is Lotte Department Store back from the station. The mall consists of a shopping mall and the Lotte Cinema theater. And there is Suwon Station Transit Center connected to Suwon station.

In a survey conducted in 2011 by the Ministry of Land, Transport and Maritime Affairs on 92 administrative divisions across the country, it reported that the bus stop, near Suwon Station and AK Plaza, was the most frequently used, with a daily average of 77,326 people boarding and 63,255 people alighting.

== Surrounding area ==
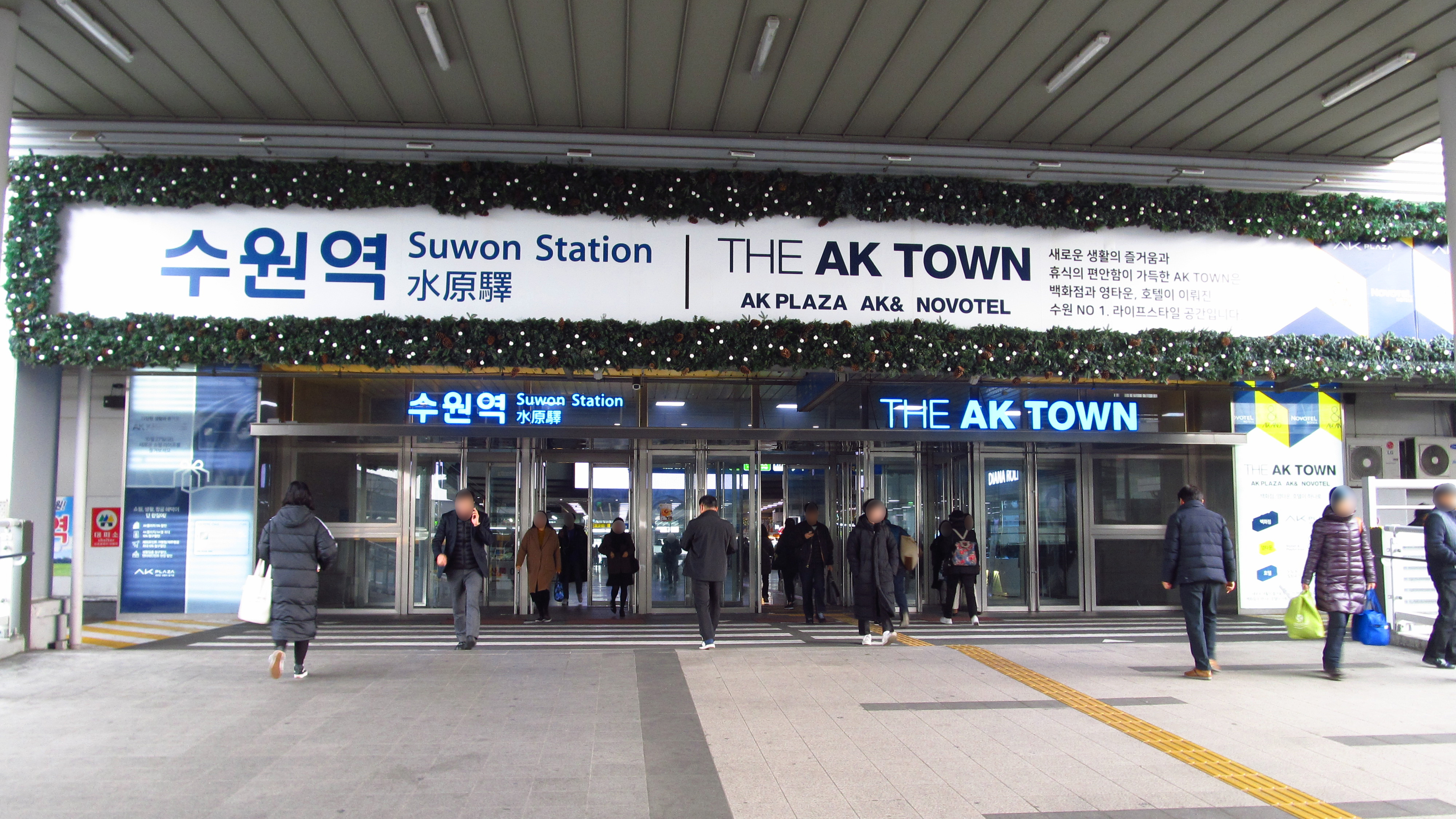
Suwon Station west side entrance

=== West side ===
- Suwon Messe
- Lotte mall Suwon store (Lotte Department Store, Lotte Mart)

=== East side ===
- Suwon Station Rodeo Street
- AK Plaza
- Novotel Ambassador Suwon Hotel
- Gyeonggi-do Provincial Government

== Gallery ==
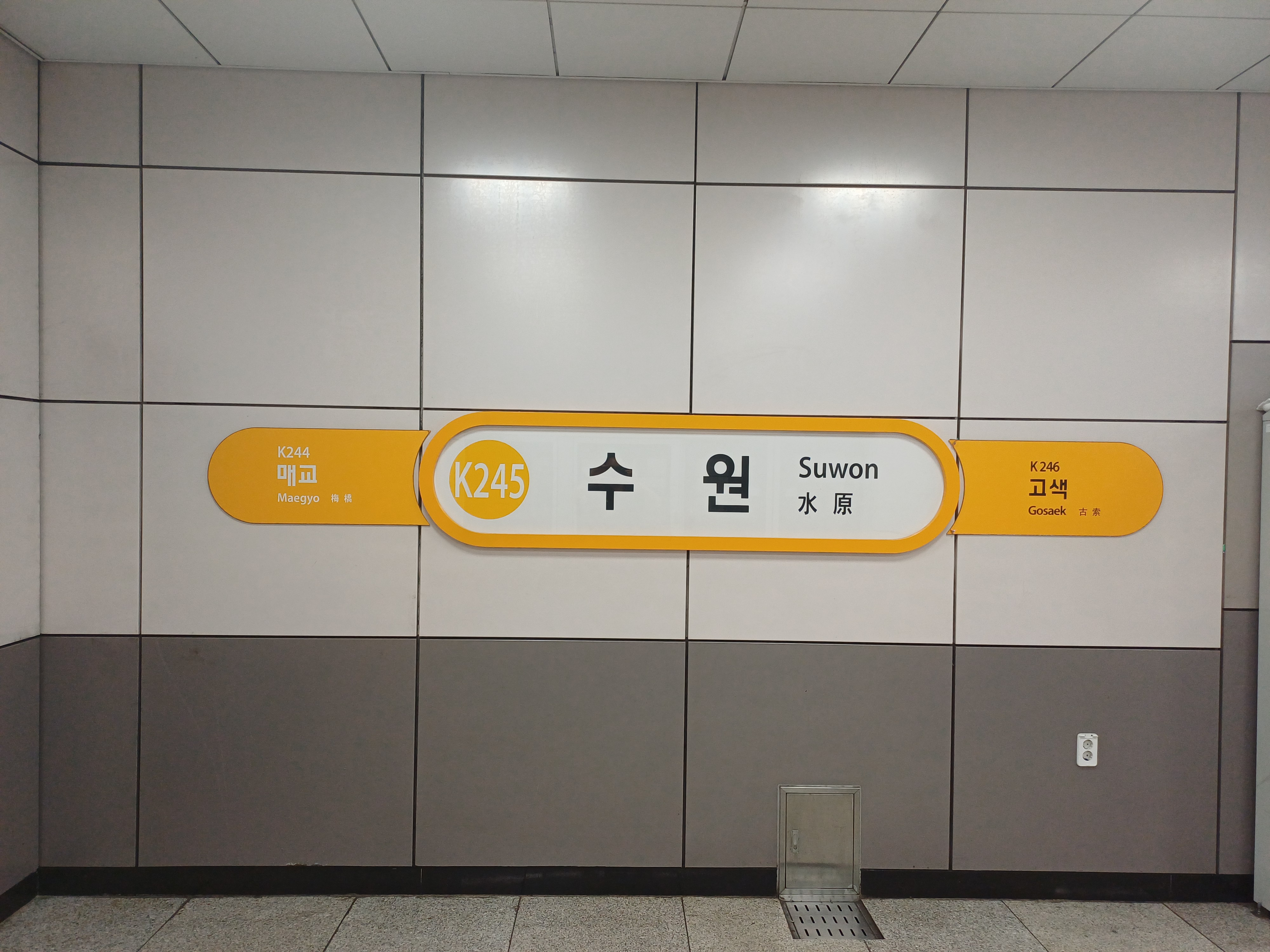
Station sign (Suin–Bundang Line)

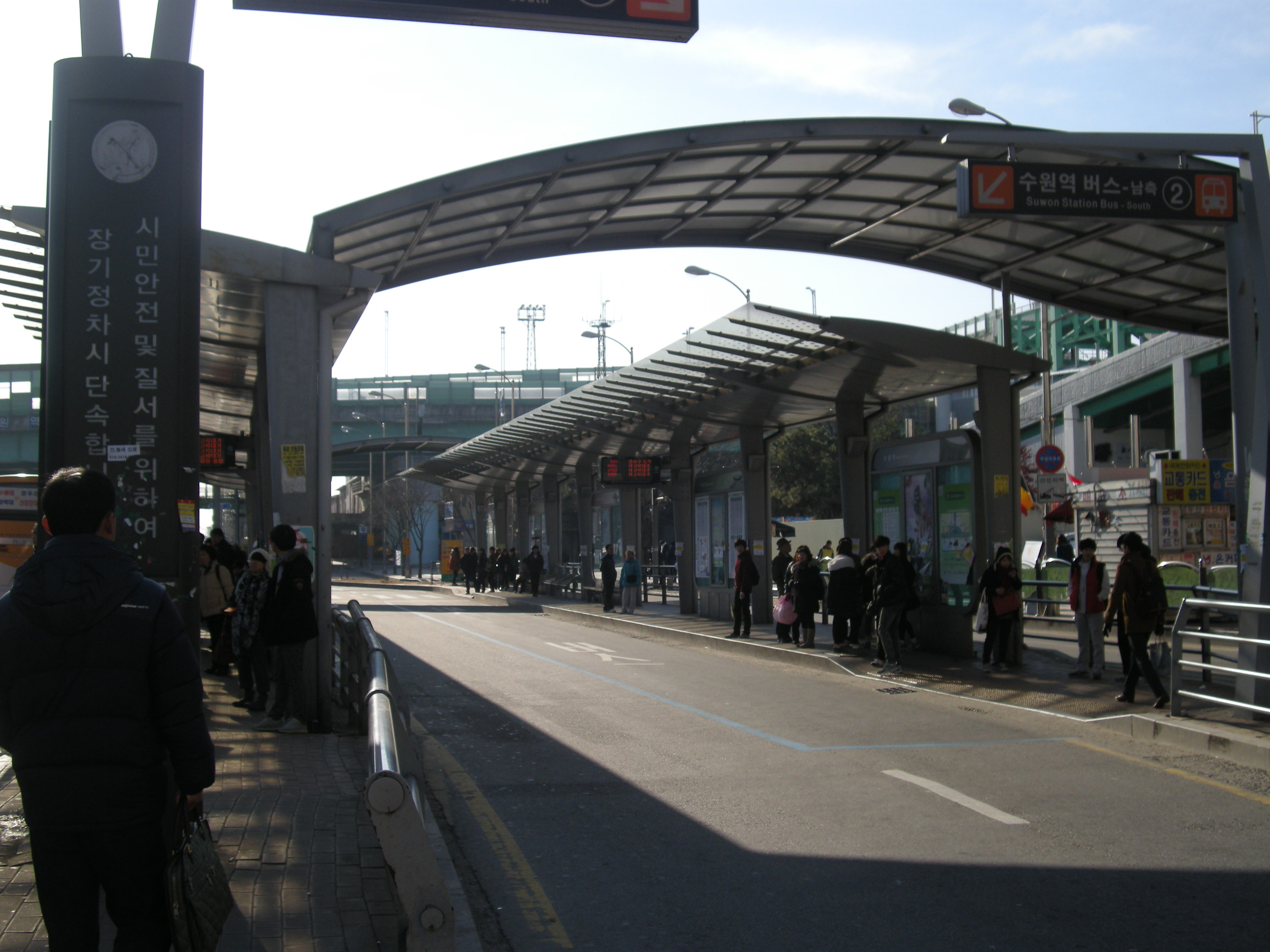
Suwon Station bus stop
