= Suji High School =

School in Yongin, South Korea

Suji High School is a public high school (ages 16–18) in Yongin, South Korea. It was opened on November 1, 1994. It holds 684 students as of 2010. It used to be an unstandardized high school where only students who achieve a high grade in middle school were allowed to enter. However, since 2015, it became standardized due to Yongin's standardized high school policy.

== Symbols ==
- School tree: pine – It means unyieldingly noble beliefs and principles and loyalty.
- School flower: magnolia – Because of its color, it means noble and pure mind.
- School bird: crane- It stands for lofty grace.
- School emblem: Its shape come from its Hangul name 수지's ㅅ and ㅈ and its color means harmony of sky(blue) and land(yellow). Also it stands for high(lofty) spirit and modesty.

== History ==
The school was granted permission to be founded on 11 November 1994, with the first principal, ChoongGyo Shin being appointed in March of the following year. The 5th principal, JeonYeol Lyu was appointed in 1 March 2010.

== Curriculum ==
1. Grade 10th
  1. General subject: Korean, Ethics, Society, Korean History, Mathematics, Science, Technique&Housekeeping, P.E, Music, Art, English.
  2. Special subject:
2. Grade 11th
  1. General subject: Information society and Computer, P.E and Health, Chinese character.
  2. Advanced (Intensified) subject: Literature, MathematicsI(1st term), Mathematics II (2nd term), Physics I, Chemistry I, Biology I, Earth Science I, English I.
  3. Elective subject: Music and Life/ Art and Life
3. Grade 12th
  1. General subject: Citizen ethics, Ecology and Environment.
  2. Advanced (Intensified) subject: Reading, Practical English Conversation, Integral and Statistics, Geometry and Vector.
  3. Elective subject: Spanish/Chinese, Korean Geography/Korean Modern and Contemporary History, Physics II/Chemistry II/Biology II/Earth Science II (select 2), English Reading and Composition/English II.

== Student Council ==
It consists of chairman, vice-chairman, scribe, 8 department heads, 8 deputy department heads.

1. Chairman
2. Vice-chairman
3. Scribe
4. General affairs department
  1. Department head
  2. Deputy department head
5. Order-Fulfilling department
  1. Department head
  2. Deputy department head
6. Environment department
  1. Department head
  2. Deputy department head
7. Service department
  1. Department head
  2. Deputy department head
8. Health department
  1. Department head
  2. Deputy department head
9. Art and Science department
  1. Department head
  2. Deputy department head
10. Information department
  1. Department head
  2. Deputy department head
11. P.E department
  1. Department head
  2. Deputy department head

== Location ==
It is located in 113, Supung-ro, Suji-gu, Yongin-si, Gyeonggi-do, South Korea
