= Suwon City Hall station =

Metro station in Suwon, South Korea

| 수원시청 (경기아트센터); Suwon City Hall (Gyeonggi Art Center) |
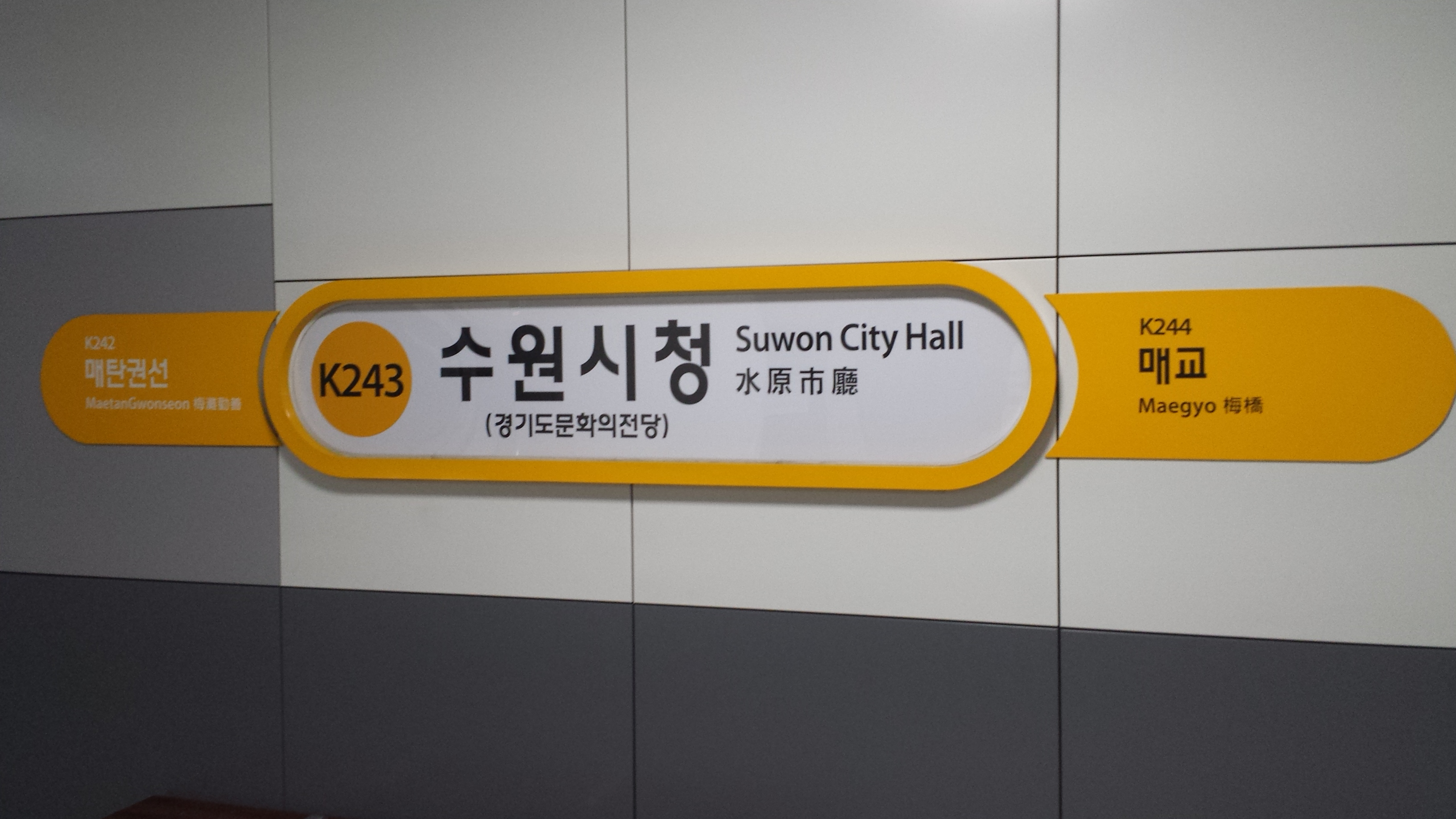

Korean name
- Hangul: 수원시청역
- Hanja: 水原市廳驛
- Revised Romanization: Suwonsicheong-yeok
- McCune–Reischauer: Suwŏnsich'ŏng-yŏk

General information
- Location: Jiha270, Hyowon-ro, Gwonseon-gu, Suwon-si, Gyeonggi-do
- Coordinates: 37°15′43″N 127°01′50″E
- Operator: Korail
- Line: Suin–Bundang Line
- Platforms: 2
- Tracks: 2

Construction
- Structure type: Underground

Key dates
- November 30, 2013: Suin–Bundang Line opened
Location

Suwon City Hall is a subway station of the Suin–Bundang Line, the commuter subway line of Korail, the national railway of South Korea. The station was opened in November 2013, as part of the final extension of the Bundang Line. As its name suggests, Suwon City Hall is located right next to the station.

| Preceding station | Seoul Metropolitan Subway | Following station |
|---|---|---|
| MaetanGwonseon towards Cheongnyangni | Suin–Bundang Line | Maegyo towards Incheon |
| Mangpo towards Wangsimni | Suin–Bundang Line Bundang Express Line | Suwon towards Gosaek |
