= Geumgok-dong, Seongnam =

Neighborhood in Seongnam, South Korea

Coordinates: 37°22′N 127°06′E

- Hangul: 금곡동
- Hanja: 金谷洞
- RR: Geumgok-dong
- MR: Kŭmgok-tong

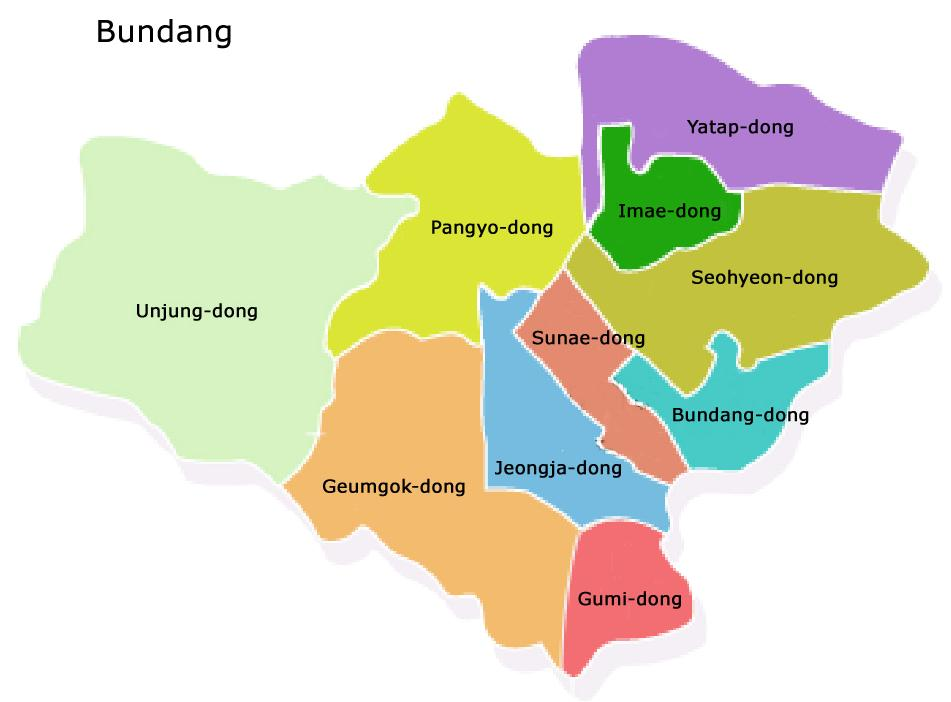
Administrative Divisions of Bundang

Geumgok-dong (Korean: 금곡동) is a dong of Bundang district, Seongnam, Gyeonggi Province, South Korea. It is officially divided into Geumgok-1-dong and Geumgok-2-dong. As of January 2, 2025, the population of Geumgok-dong is 26,905, spanning 12,033 households. It comprises 5.76km^{2} or 4.0% of Bundang-gu. It was established in July 1973. Geumgok was originally known as 'Soegol' (쇠골) and 'Soetgol' (쇳골), which gives birth to the hanja name '金谷', meaning 'valley of gold', although it is not known if gold was once mined in the area, as 'soe' can hold different meanings depending on the dialect.

== Education ==
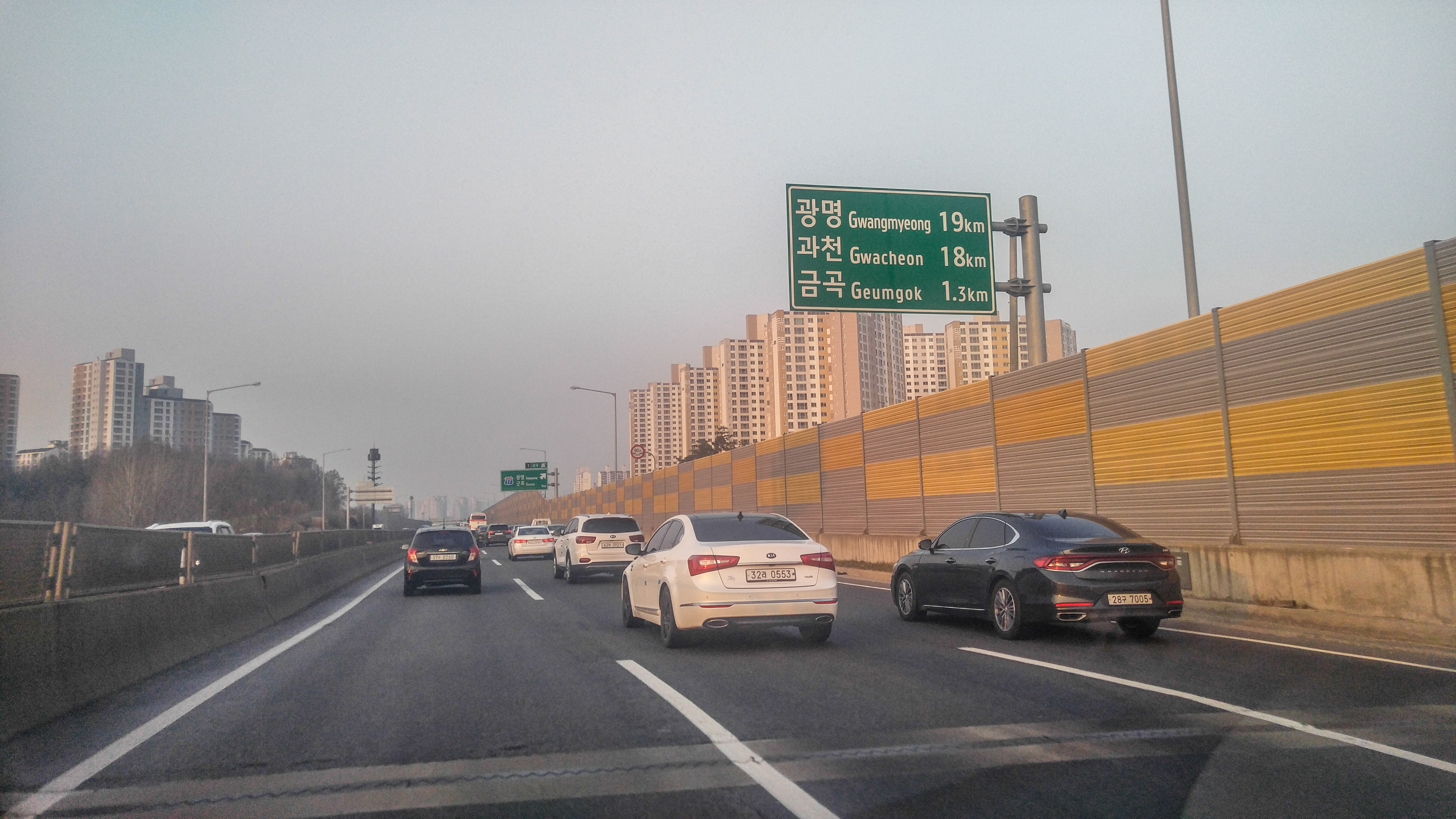
A highway interchange in Geumgok-dong.

Geumgok-dong is home to the following educational institutions:

- Cheongsol Elementary School [ko] (청솔초등학교; 청솔初等學校)
- Cheongsol Middle School [ko] (청솔중학교; 청솔中學校)
- Bundang Management High School [ko] (분당경영고등학교; 盆唐經營高等學校)
