= Suji District =

District of Yongin, South Korea

Coordinates: 37.322117°N 127.097437°E

- Non-autonomous District
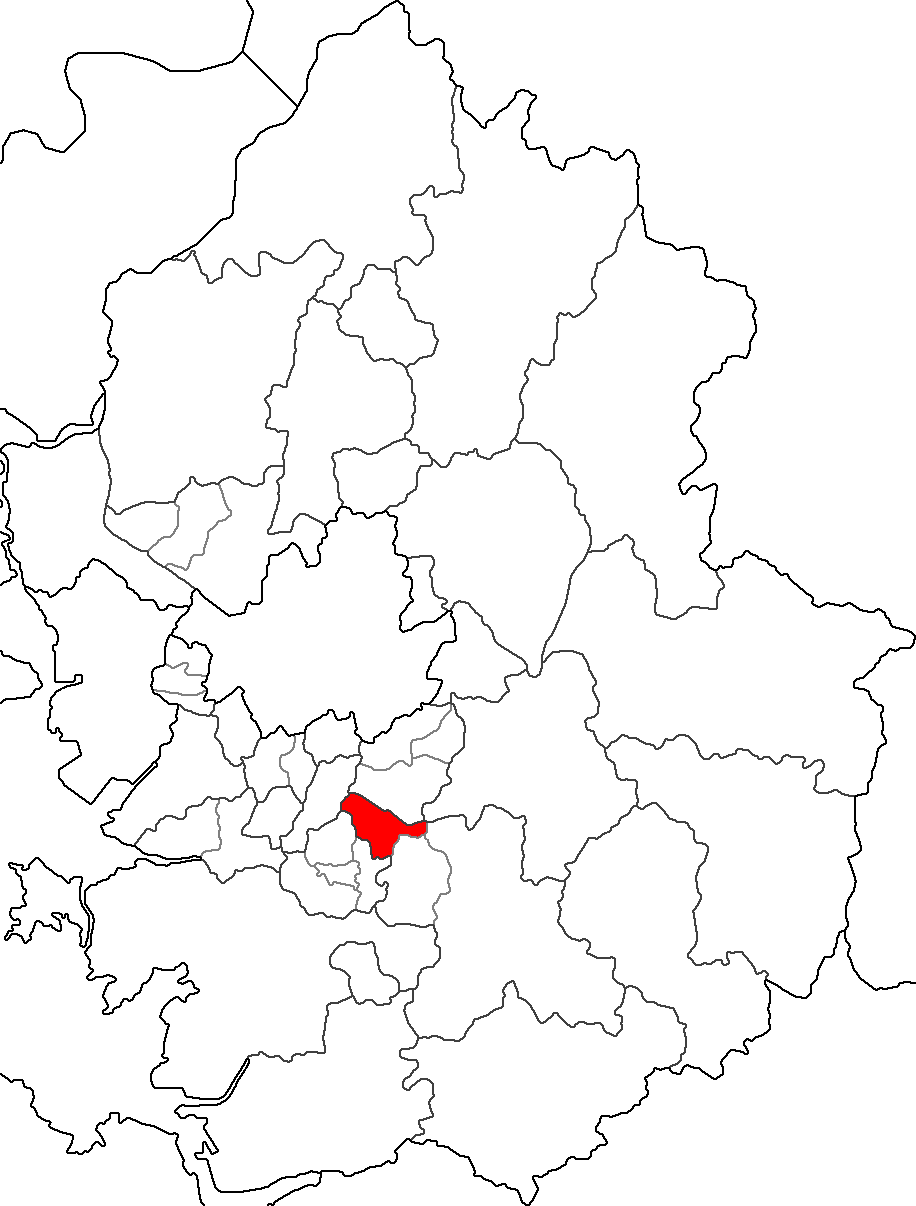
- Map of Gyeonggi highlighting Suji District.
- Country: South Korea
- Region: Sudogwon (Gijeon)
- Province: Gyeonggi
- City: Yongin

Area
  - Total: 42.1 km^{2} (16.3 sq mi)

Population (july 2025)
  - Total: 374,948
  - Dialect: Seoul
- Website: Suji District Office

Korean name
- Hangul: 수지구
- Hanja: 水枝區
- RR: Suji-gu
- MR: Suji-gu

Suji District (Korean: 수지구) is one of the three city districts in Yongin, South Korea. Suji became a city district on October 31, 2005, about nine years after Yongin officially became a city. When Yongin was established in 1996, both urban and rural areas were covered to become a part of the city; thus to this day, Yongin's urbanization is varied throughout different regions of the city. Suji is one of the most urbanized areas of Yongin, as it borders Seongnam's Bundang District and Suwon, two more well developed areas. Home to the newly built Shinsegae Department Store and Dankook University in one of its towns, Jukjeon, Suji is rapidly developing as Yongin becomes more and more urbanized. In recent years, the district has attracted upper-class Koreans, with the completion of the Samsung East Palace in 2010.

== History ==
Yongin first started as Yongin-hyeon, which was promoted in Yongin-gun under the 23 province system on May 26, 1895, and then the 13 providence system on August 4, 1896. As South Korea was occupied by the Japanese during the following years, new areas, including Yangji-gun, and a portion of Juksan-gun, were incorporated in Yongin-gun on April 1, 1914. This remained unchanged until 1973, when Jukjeon-ri and Guseong-myeon were incorporated under the President Decree No. 6542. At 1983, Iui-ri and Ha-ri were separated and Incorporated Suwon-city under the President Decree No.11027. When March 1, 1996, Yongin-gun promoted to Yongin-city, Suji-myeon (Village) as promoted to Suji-eup (Town). On December 24, 2001, Suji-eup was promoted to Suji Agency under the Yongin-City Ordinance No. 368. Several changes occurred throughout the following years until October 31, 2005, when three gu (ward) offices, Cheoin District, Giheung District, and Suji District, were established and Suji Agency was promoted to Suji District Office.

== Education ==
Suji District has 23 elementary schools, 14 middle schools, and 7 high schools.

Suji District is also the site of Dankook University in Jukjeon-dong.

== Administration ==
Suji District is divided into 10 dong (동, "neighborhoods"):

- Dongcheon-dong (동천동)
  - Gogi-dong (고기동)
- Jukjeon 1- and 2-dong (죽전동)
- Pungdeokcheon 1- and 2-dong (풍덕천동)
- Sanghyeon 1-, 2- and 3-dong (상현동)
- Seongbok-dong (성복동)
- Sinbong-dong (신봉동)

== Culture and Tourism ==
Suji District is home to Seobongsaji Hyeono Guksa Tapbi, which is a monument dedicated to the Buddhist monk, Hyeono Guksa, of the Goryeo Dynasty. It was constructed in 1185 and is located in Sinbong-dong. According to the inscription, Hyun-o-guk-sa became a disciple of Buddha at age 15 and the Most Reverend Priest in 1147. This monument represents Hyun-o-guk-sa and the continuum of great priests.

Also located in Suji District are Stone Buddhist Statue of Mipyeongni, the biggest Buddhist statue in Yongin, Cheoinsung Fortress Site, where troops of the government fought against the Mongolians during the Koyro era, and Baeknyeonsa, the oldest Buddhist temple in Yongin.

Everland is a resort with a famous amusement park and hotel in the outskirts of Cheoin District, in Yongin, which attracts visitors throughout the year. Situated next to Everland is the waterpark Caribbean Bay.

== Transportation ==
Suji District is served well with public transportation, which includes intercity buses and Five subway stations. The Bundang Line connects Suji District to Bundang and the rest of Seoul at Jukjeon-dong, which is home to the newly constructed Jukjeon Station. And, Four Shinbundang Line Stations: Dongcheon Station, Suji-gu Office Station, Seongbok Station, Sanghyeon Station also located on Suji District.

=== Buses ===
==== Transit buses to Seoul ====
Transit (commuter) buses are called Wide Area Lines in Seoul and with red color. Some buses operated by companies in Gyeonggi Province are in different colors (as in the picture below). Those buses are filled to capacity during rush hour.

Buses to Seoul are numbered in the 9000s and 9400s in Jukjeon-dong, M4101 and 1002, 6900, 8201 in the Pungdeokcheon-dong, 1550 and 5500-2 via Sinbong-dong, 1570 via Seongbok-dong and M5115 via Sanghyeon-station. These buses serve most districts in Seoul.

==== Inter-city Buses ====
Suji District has many inter-city buses that are denoted with green color and are usually smaller than the red Transit buses. There is also a bus service called the Airport Limousine with direct service to both Incheon International Airport and Gimpo Airport.

=== Subways ===
Bundang Line is a commuter subway line of the Korail. It was first constructed for the commuters of Bundang which the name 'Bundang Line' came from. It serves southeastern Seoul and Seongnam. Jukjeon Station is in Suji District.

Phase 2 Extension of Shinbundang Line is completed in 2016, the subway line connects Gangnam District to Seoul Subway Line 1 at Suwon via Pangyo, Jeongja Station (Bundang), Suji, and Gwanggyo.

==== Expressways ====
Suji District is close to Seoul Ring Expressway and Gyeongbu Expressway. Seosuji IC and Gwanggyo-Sanghyeon IC of the recently completed Yongin-Seoul Expressway also serve Suji.

=== Taxis ===
In Suji District, taxis are not very common in the residential area but are more common in busy areas, such as Jukjeon Station and shopping malls. Local taxis are typically white with blue light that says "Yongin Si". There are two types of taxis: an "ordinary" (ilban;일반) taxi and a "model" (mobum;모범) taxi, which is painted black and is bigger (in size) and much more expensive than the former ones.

== Shopping ==
Major shopping areas include Shinsegae Department Store in Jukjeon-dong, E-mart, Suji Fashion Town, and Lotte Mart. Shinsegae Department Store also has CJ CGV, a big movie theater. Other nearby shopping areas include Samsung Plaza in Seohyeon-dong, Bundang, and Lotte Department Store in Sunae-dong, Bundang.

== Development ==
Through the development of the designated Jukjeon Residential Land Development Zone, the Shinbong-Dongcheong Residential Land Development Zone, the Seongbok Residential Land Development Zone, the urbanization process of Suji District accelerated under Development Plan No. 1 and No. 2. As stated previously, Jukjeon-dong itself is urbanizing very rapidly as Shinsegae Department Store was newly constructed, along with Jukjeon Station, a park, and the newly situated main campus of Dangook University from Seoul to Suji District.

=== Major City Projects ===
==== Erection of the Culture and Welfare Center ====
The Culture and Welfare Center provides welfare facilities for the elderly, cultural resources, and a sports center. The center is located in the Jukjeon Residential Land Development Zone.

- Period: 2006–2007
- Location: 1807 Jukjeon-dong (inside the Jukjeon Residential Land Development Zone)
- Area: Site Area: 16,496m^{2} / Construction Area: 37,455m^{2}
- Total Cost: Approximately 63.6 billion won (estimated)
- Cost of Site Purchase: 14.7 billion won
- Construction Cost: 50 billion won

==== Erection of the Welfare Hall for Elderly Citizens ====
The Welfare Hall increased the number of health improvement programs for elderly citizens, as well as cultural programs and free or low costing entertainment. The center is designed to be the basis of recreational activities for the elderly. It is located in the Jukjeon Residential Land Development Zone.

- Period: 2005–2007
- Location: 1807 Jukjeon-dong (inside the Jukjeon Residential Land Development Zone)
- Total Area: 16,491m^{2} (4,997 pyeong)
- Site Used: 4,950m^{2} (1,500 pyeong)
- Total Building Area: 5,940m^{2} (1,800 pyeong), (Four stories above ground and two below)
- Gate Ball Park: 660m^{2} (200 pyeong)
- Major Facilities: Exclusive Day Care Facilities for Dementia Patients, Counseling Center for Elderly Citizens, Cafeteria, Physical Therapy Room, Rehabilitation Room

==== New Construction of the Shin-bong District Daycare Center ====
Shin-bong District Daycare Center provides various nursing services in Shin-bong, an area in great need of childcare facilities.

- Period: 2003–2006
- Location: 886 Sinbong-dong
- Total Cost: 2,168 million won
- Area and Facilities
- Site: 674m^{2} (264 pyeong)
- Total Area: 999.79m^{2} (302 pyeong), (Three stories above ground and one below)
- Major Facilities: Nursing Facilities, Kitchen, Office, Archives, Auditorium, Play Yard

== See also ==
- Bundang Line
- Shinbundang Line
- Administrative divisions of South Korea
