= Yeongtong station =

Metro station in Suwon, South Korea

영통 (경희대); Yeongtong (Kyung Hee Univ.)
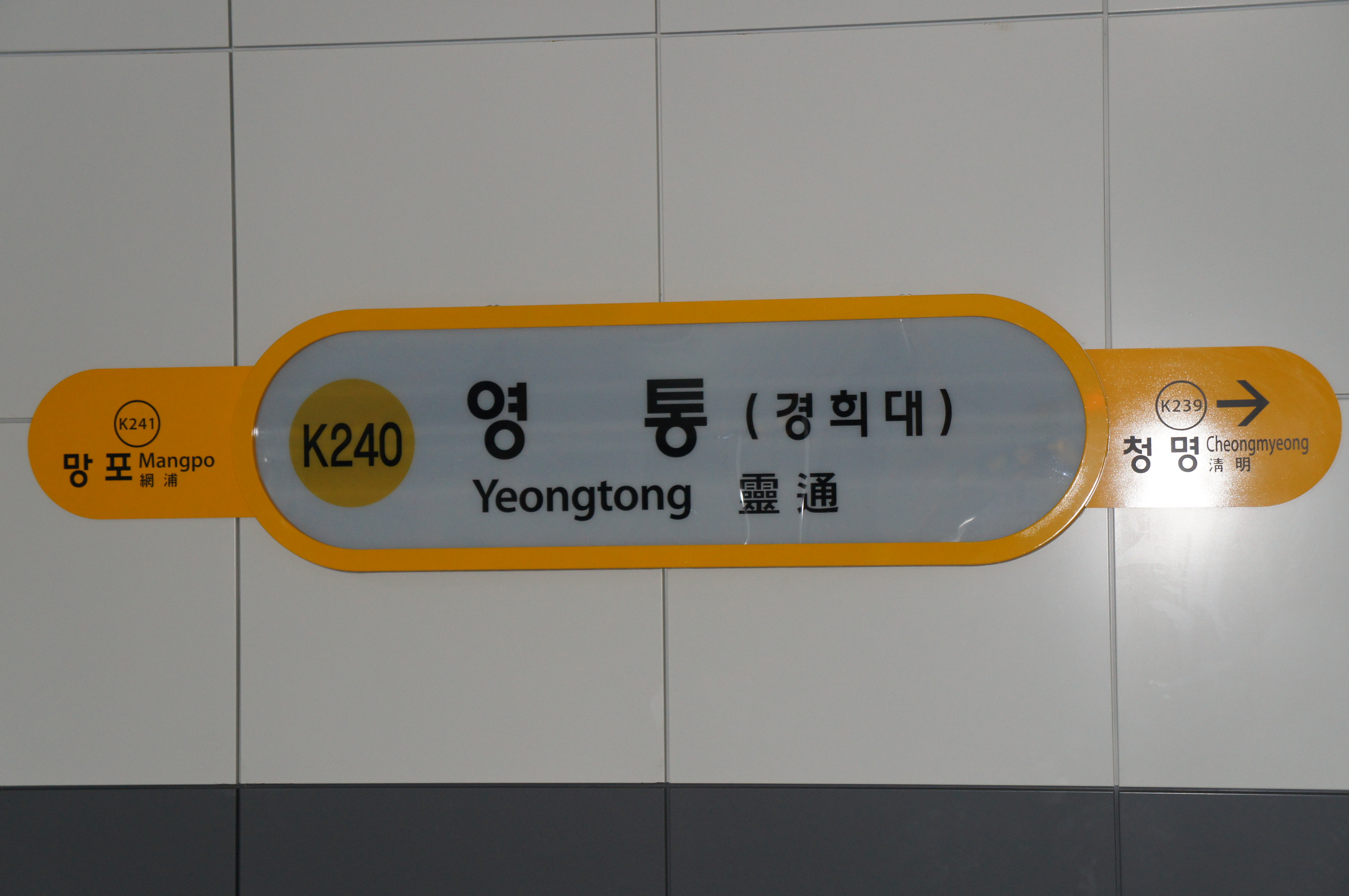

Korean name
- Hangul: 영통역
- Hanja: 靈通驛
- Revised Romanization: Yeongtongnyeok
- McCune–Reischauer: Yŏngtongnyŏk

General information
- Location: 994-1 Yeongtong-dong, Yeongtong-gu, Suwon-si, Gyeonggi-do
- Coordinates: 37.251528°N 127.071347°E
- Operator: Korail
- Line: Suin–Bundang Line
- Platforms: 2
- Tracks: 2

Construction
- Structure type: Underground

Key dates
- December 1, 2012: Suin–Bundang Line opened
Location

Yeongtong Station is a subway station of the Suin–Bundang Line, the commuter subway line of Korail, the national railway of South Korea.

The station was opened in December 2012, as part of the Mangpo extension of the Bundang Line. It is close to the Suwon Immigration office. Near exit #2 of Yeongtong Station, there is a large Homeplus. Nearby is the Suwon Immigration office.

Preceding station	Seoul Metropolitan Subway	Following station
Cheongmyeong towards Cheongnyangni	Suin–Bundang Line	Mangpo towards Incheon
