= Sunae station =

Metro station in Seongnam, South Korea

| 수내 (한국잡월드); Sunae (Korea Jobworld) |
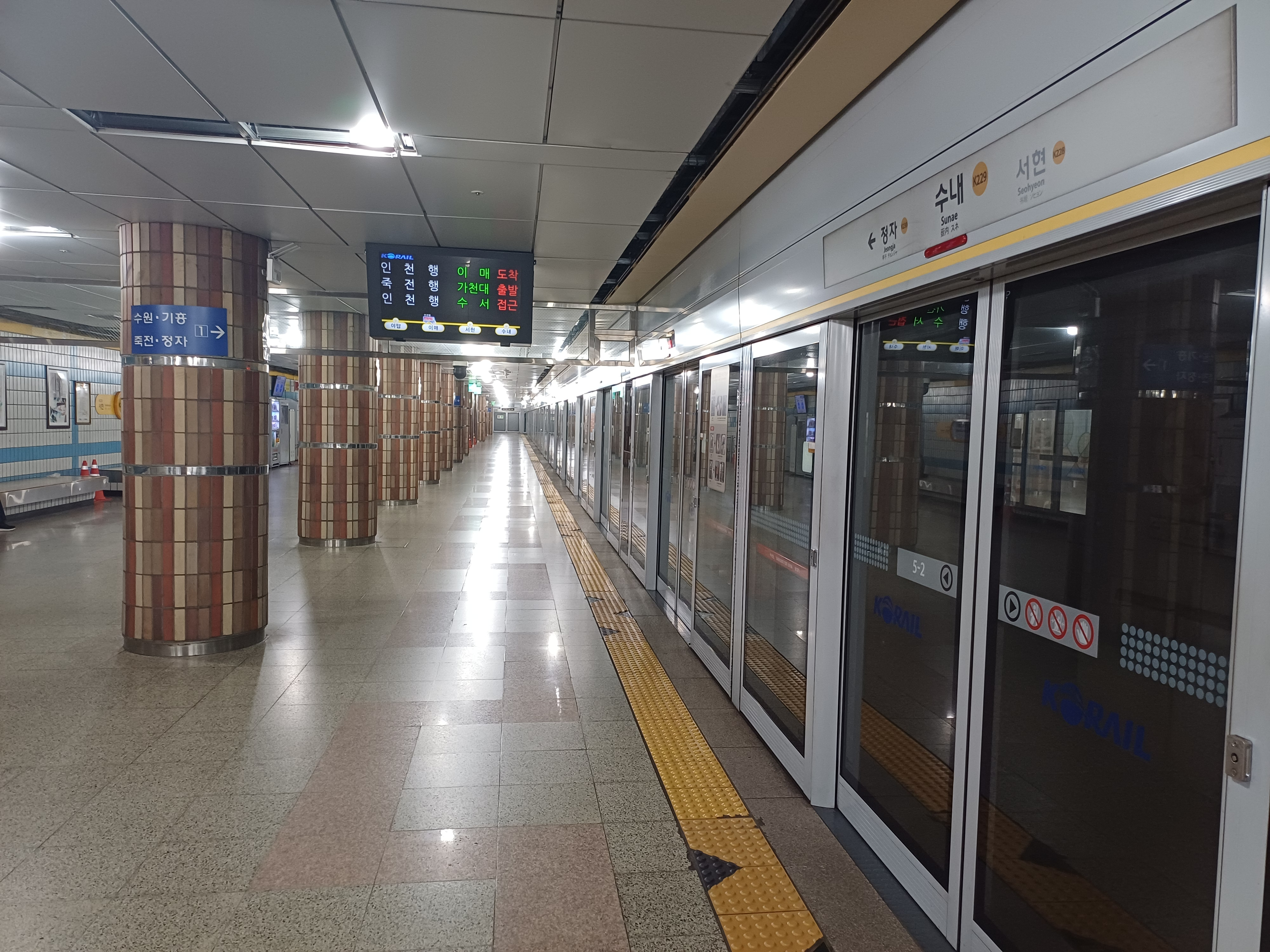
- Station platform

Korean name
- Hangul: 수내역
- Hanja: 藪內驛
- Revised Romanization: Sunae-yeok
- McCune–Reischauer: Sunae-yŏk

General information
- Location: 14 Sunae-dong, Bundang-gu, Seongnam-si, Gyeonggi-do
- Coordinates: 37°22′42.79″N 127°06′51.39″E
- Operator: Korail
- Line: Suin–Bundang Line
- Platforms: 2
- Tracks: 2

Construction
- Structure type: Underground

History
- Former names: Chorim (until 2002)

Key dates
- September 1, 1994: Suin–Bundang Line opened
Location

Sunae Station is a subway station on the Suin–Bundang Line between Seohyeon Station and Jeongja Station. Its substation name is Korea Job World. At the time of the opening of the Bundang Line in 1994, this station was called Chorim Station.

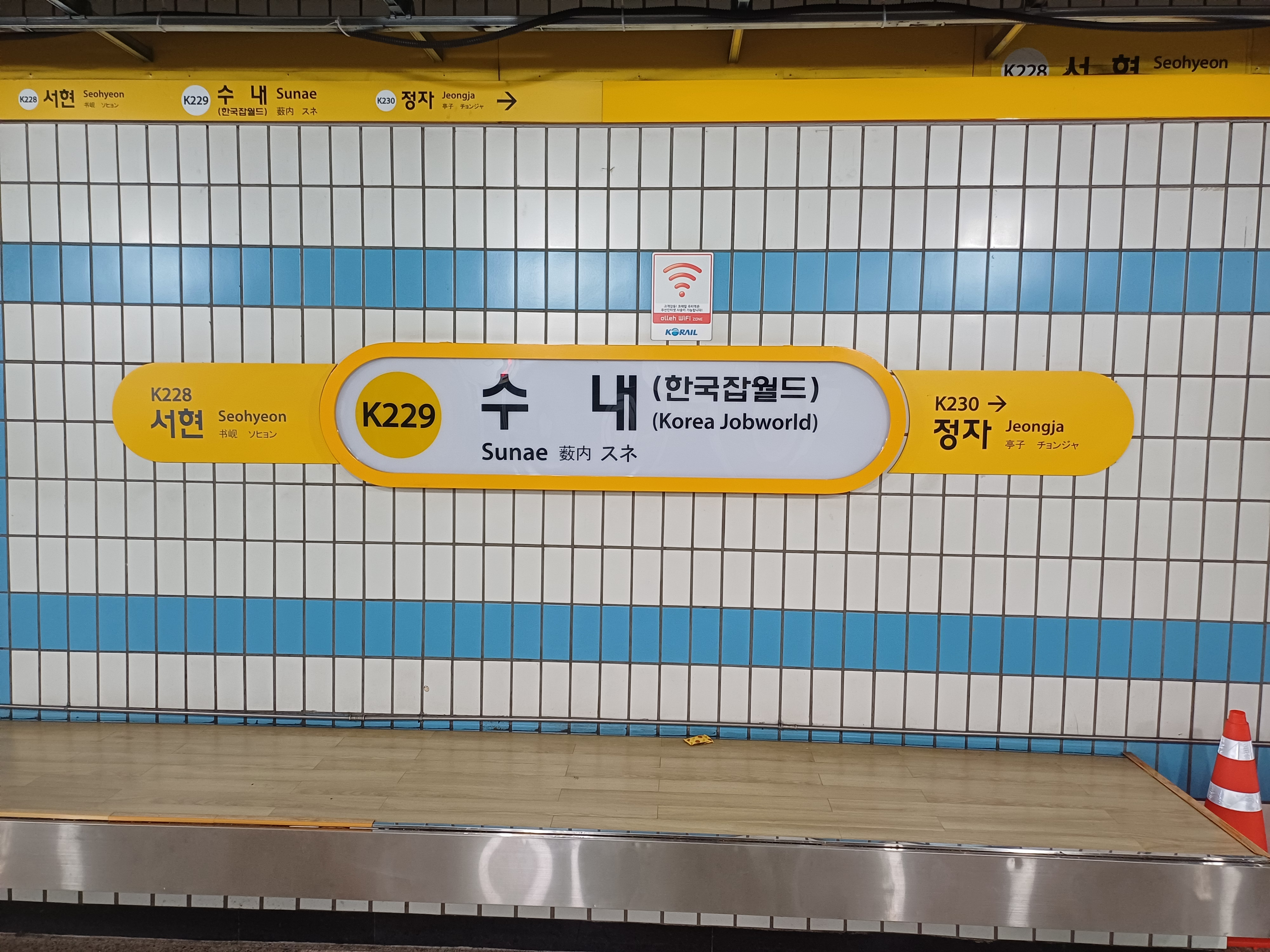
Station nameplate

== Places ==
Lotte Department Store Bundang is connected to the station via an underground passageway. In the area around Sunae Station, there are many stores and restaurants, generally more expensive than those located near Seohyeon Station. The area is similar to that of Seohyeon Station, with a wide pedestrian lane of stores and restaurants running north and south of the station and a large indoor shopping center centered above the station, but much quieter than Seohyeon.

| Preceding station | Seoul Metropolitan Subway | Following station |
|---|---|---|
| Seohyeon towards Cheongnyangni | Suin–Bundang Line | Jeongja towards Incheon |
