= MaetanGwonseon station =

Metro station in Suwon, South Korea

매탄권선; MaetanGwonseon
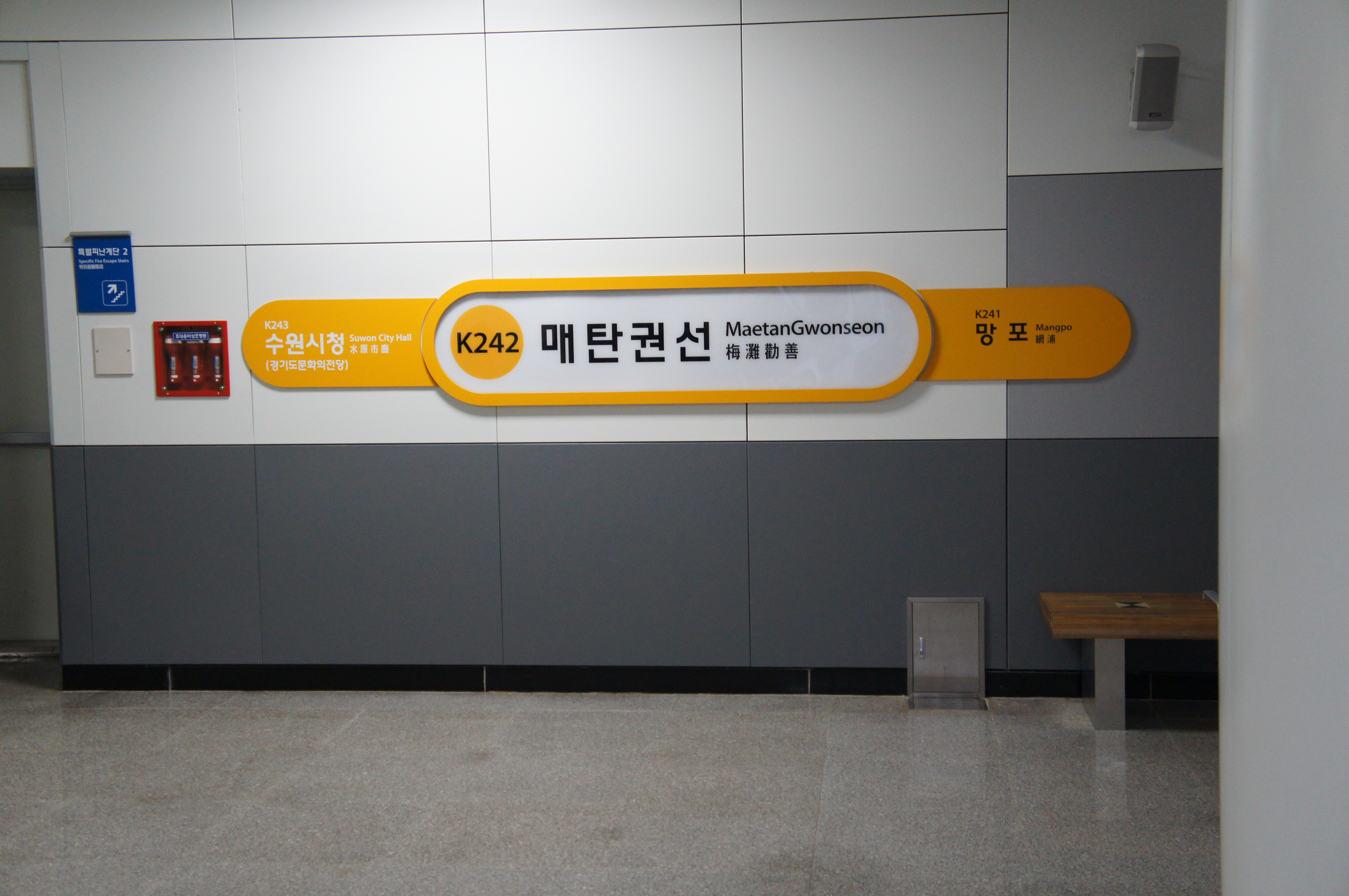

Korean name
- Hangul: 매탄권선
- Hanja: 梅灘勸善
- Revised Romanization: MaetanGwonseon
- McCune–Reischauer: Maet'anGwŏnsŏn

General information
- Location: Jiha 841, Gwonseon-ro, Yeongtong-gu, Suwon-si, Gyeonggi-do
- Coordinates: 37°15′11″N 127°02′25″E
- Operator: Korail
- Line: Suin–Bundang Line
- Platforms: 2
- Tracks: 2

Construction
- Structure type: Underground

Key dates
- November 30, 2013: Suin–Bundang Line opened
Location

MaetanGwonseon Station is a subway station of the Suin–Bundang Line, the commuter subway line of Korail, the national railway of South Korea. The station was opened in November 2013, as part of the final extension of the Bundang Line.

Preceding station	Seoul Metropolitan Subway	Following station
Mangpo towards Cheongnyangni	Suin–Bundang Line	Suwon City Hall towards Incheon
