= Dongcheon-dong, Yongin =

Coordinates: 37.3419°N 127.0992°E

- Hangul: 동천동
- Hanja: 東川洞
- RR: Dongcheon-dong
- MR: Tongch'ŏn-dong

Dongcheon-dong (Korean: 동천동) is a dong located in Suji-gu, Yongin, South Korea. In 2010, it was home to around 31,000 individuals.

== Education ==
=== Elementary schools ===
- Dongcheon Elementary School
- Son'gok Elementary School
- Hanbit Elementary School

=== Middle schools ===
- Son'gok Middle School
- Yongin Hanbit Middle School
