= Maegyo station =

Metro station in Suwon, South Korea

매교; Maegyo
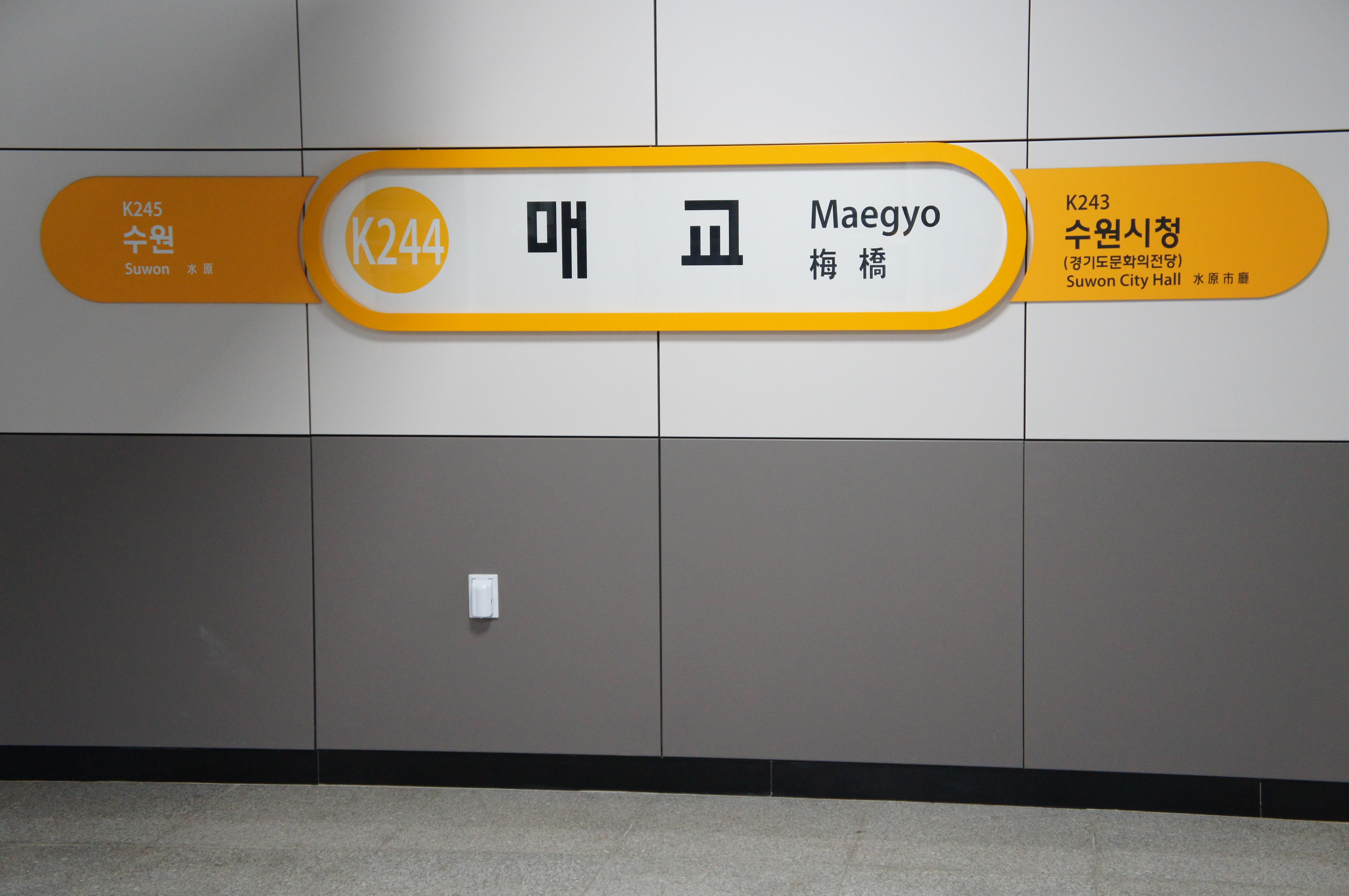
- Station sign

Korean name
- Hangul: 매교역
- Hanja: 梅橋驛
- Revised Romanization: Maegyo-yeok
- McCune–Reischauer: Maegyo-yŏk

General information
- Location: Jiha126, Hyowon-ro, Paldal-gu, Suwon-si, Gyeonggi-do
- Operator: Korail
- Line: Suin–Bundang Line
- Platforms: 2
- Tracks: 2

Construction
- Structure type: Underground

Key dates
- November 30, 2013: Suin–Bundang Line opened
Location

Maegyo Station is a subway station of the Suin–Bundang Line, the commuter subway line of Korail, and the national railway of South Korea. The station was opened in November 2013, as part of the final extension of the Bundang Line.

Preceding station	Seoul Metropolitan Subway	Following station
Suwon City Hall towards Cheongnyangni	Suin–Bundang Line	Suwon towards Incheon
