= Cheongmyeong station =

Metro station in Suwon, South Korea

청명; Cheongmyeong
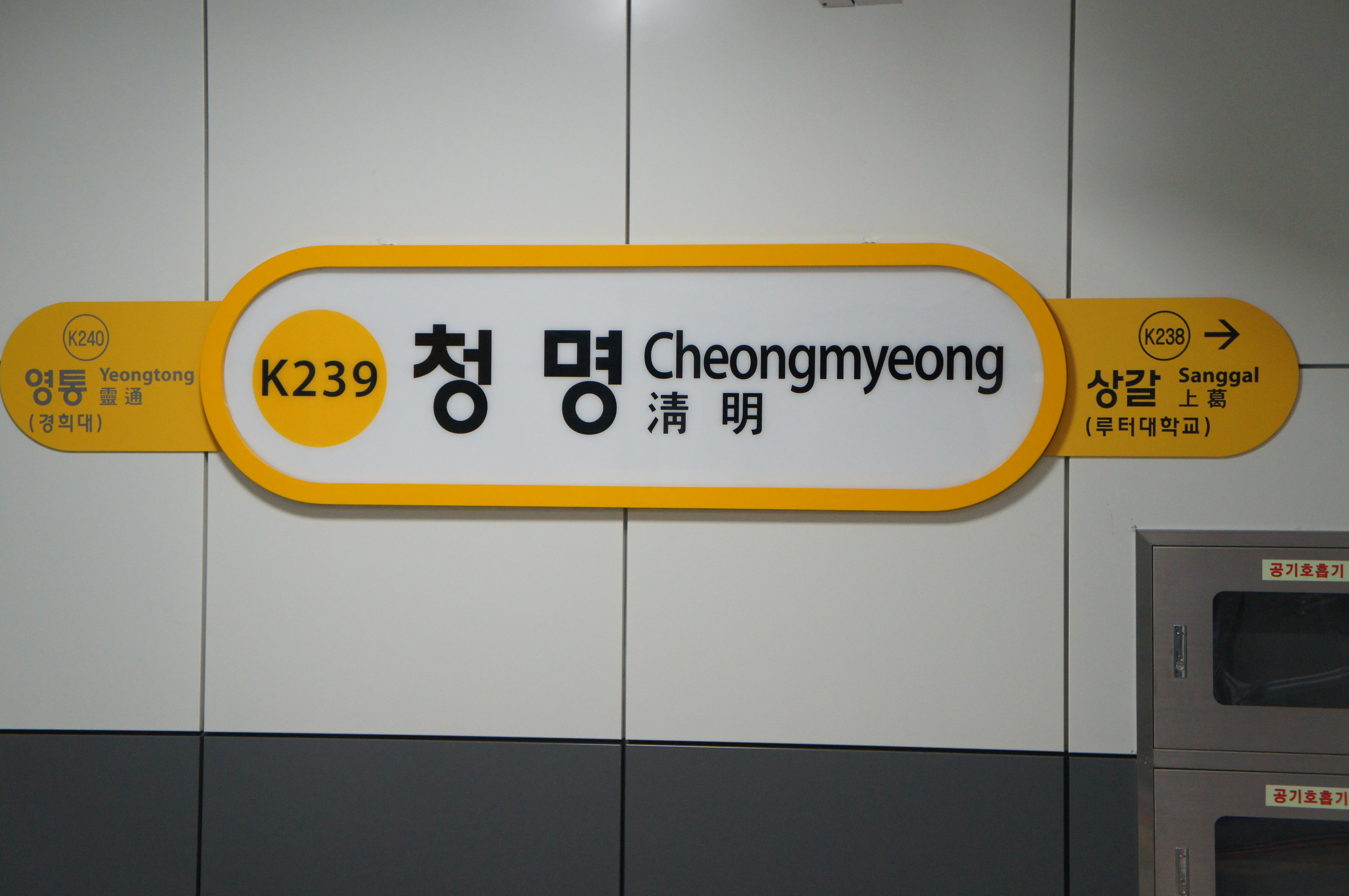

Korean name
- Hangul: 청명역
- Hanja: 淸明驛
- Revised Romanization: Cheongmyeongnyeok
- McCune–Reischauer: Ch'ŏngmyŏngnyŏk

General information
- Location: 1055 Yeongtong-dong, Yeongtong-gu, Suwon-si, Gyeonggi-do
- Coordinates: 37.259485°N 127.078945°E
- Operator: Korail
- Line: Suin–Bundang Line
- Platforms: 2
- Tracks: 2

Construction
- Structure type: Underground

Key dates
- December 1, 2012: Suin–Bundang Line opened
Location

Cheongmyeong station (Korean: 청명역) is a subway station of the Suin–Bundang Line, the commuter subway line of Korail, the national railway of South Korea. The station was opened in December 2012 as part of the Mangpo extension of the Bundang Line.

The station is located in Yeongtong-dong, Yeongtong District, Suwon, Gyeonggi Province and serves Yeongtong-dong and Yeongtong District. It has two side platforms with two tracks running between them and is located underground at an approximate depth of 28 meters. It also serves as an important transportation hub connecting to Wangsimni or Cheongnyangni stations on Seoul Subway Lines 2 & 5 respectively.

The station features a number of amenities including ticket vending machines, elevators, escalators and restrooms. It also provides transfer access to bus routes and multiple intercity buses as well as bike rental services. Additionally, there are various shops located within the premises that offer food and beverages for commuters.

The station's name derives from its native Korean name 청명 (Cheonmgyeong) which literally means "clear brightness". In hanja script it is written 淸明驛 meaning "clear bright station".

Preceding station	Seoul Metropolitan Subway	Following station
Sanggal towards Cheongnyangni	Suin–Bundang Line	Yeongtong towards Incheon
