= Jeongja station =

Metro station in Seongnam, South Korea

Coordinates: 37°21′58.60″N 127°06′29.24″E

정자; Jeongja
D12
정자
Jeongja
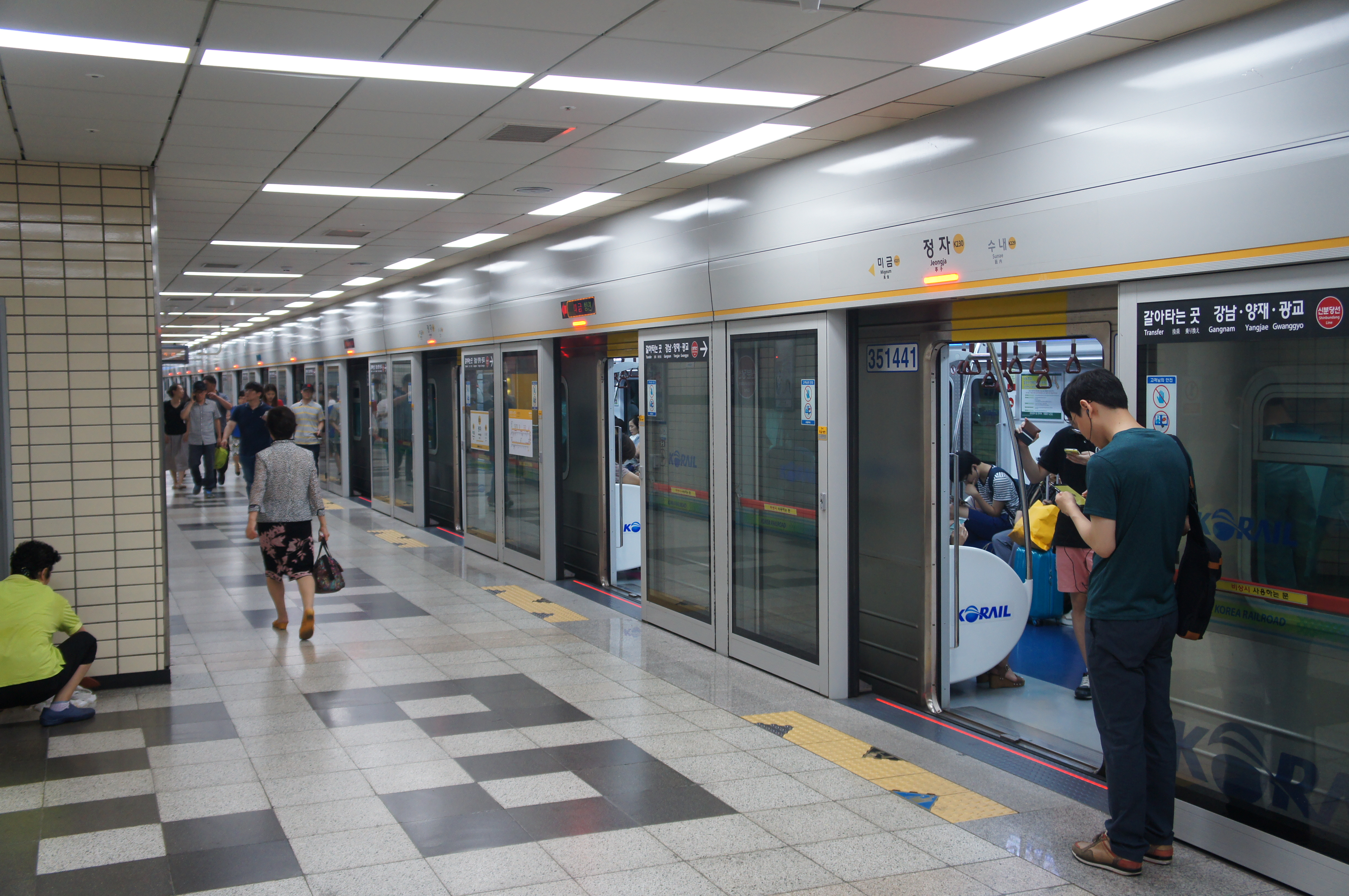
- Suin–Bundang Line's station platform

Korean name
- Hangul: 정자역
- Hanja: 亭子驛
- Revised Romanization: Jeongja-yeok
- McCune–Reischauer: Chŏngja-yŏk

General information
- Location: 333 Seongnamdaero Jiha, Bundang-gu, Seongnam-si, Gyeonggi-do
- Operator: Korail; Shinbundang Railroad Corporation
- Lines: Suin–Bundang Line; Shinbundang Line
- Platforms: 4
- Tracks: 4

Construction
- Structure type: Underground

History
- Former names: Baekgung (until 2002)

Key dates
- September 1, 1994: Suin–Bundang Line opened
- October 28, 2011: Shinbundang Line opened
Location

Jeongja Station (formerly Baekgung station) is a station on the Suin–Bundang Line and the Shinbundang Line, an express subway in South Korea.

It was the southern terminus of the Shinbundang Line, between October 2011 and January 2016, when the Shinbundang Line extended to Gwanggyo station. However, it still exists as a divide in terms of fare since riders need to pay an extra charge of 300 won (on top of the 900 won charge of using the Shinbundang Line) when crossing this station, due to the owners of Phase 1 and 2 being different. This rule only applies to the Shinbundang Line - Riders of the Bundang Line pay the normal minimum fare of 1,250 won.

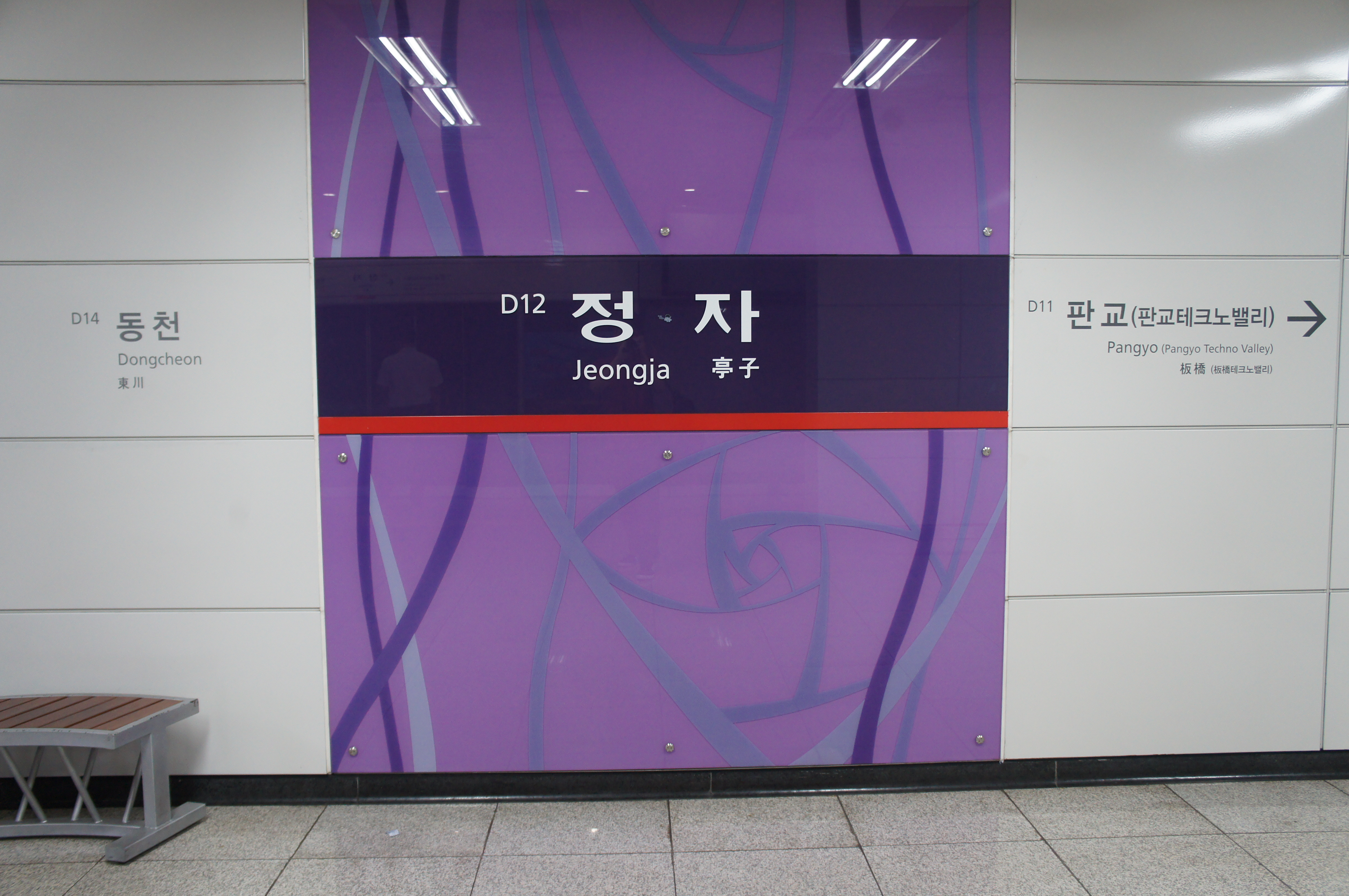
Shinbundang Line station name sign

== Station layout ==
=== Suin–Bundang Line ===
↑ Sunae
2 | | 1
Migeum↓

1	● Suin–Bundang Line	for Incheon
2	● Suin–Bundang Line	for Cheongnyangni

=== Shinbundang Line ===
↑ Pangyo
N/B | | S/B
Migeum ↓

Southbound	●Shinbundang Line	for Gwanggyo
Northbound	●Shinbundang Line	for Sinsa

== History ==
- 1 September 1994: Railway line from Suseo station to Ori station started to operate. This station was named Baekgung station.
- 25 September 2002: After Baekgung-dong merged with Jeongja-dong, this station was renamed to Jeongja station.
- 28 October 2011: The Shinbundang Line opens making Jeongja a transfer station and a terminal station of this line.
- 30 January 2016: The Shinbundang Line opens its southern extension to Gwanggyo station, thus ending its terminus status.

Preceding station	Seoul Metropolitan Subway	Following station
Sunae towards Cheongnyangni	Suin–Bundang Line	Migeum towards Incheon
Pangyo towards Sinsa	Shinbundang Line	Migeum towards Gwanggyo
