= Gosaek station =

Metro station in Suwon, South Korea

고색; Gosaek
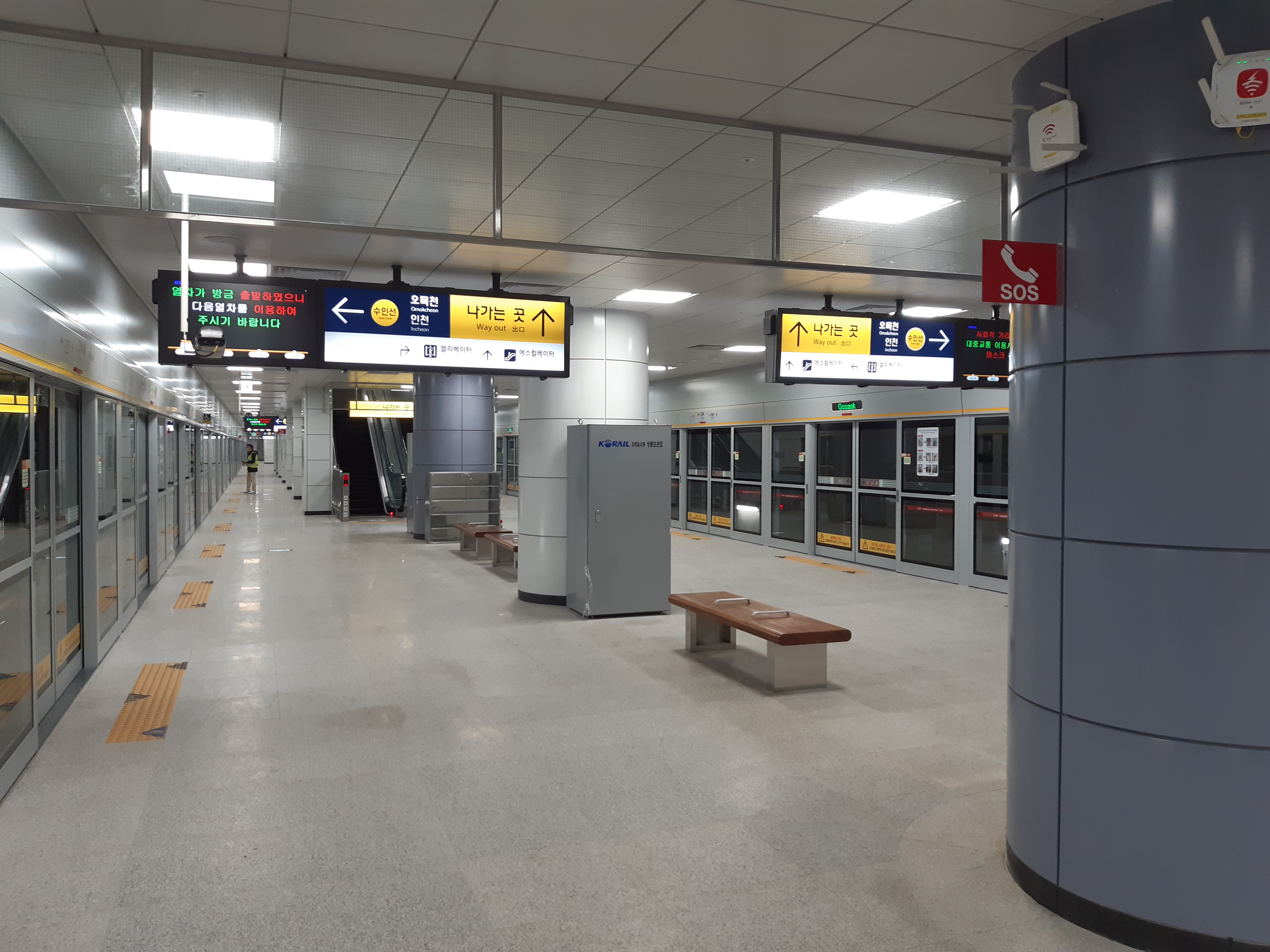

Korean name
- Hangul: 고색역
- Hanja: 古索驛
- RR: Gosaek-yeok
- MR: Kosaek-yŏk

General information
- Location: 688 Maesonggosaekro, Gwonseon-gu, Suwon, Gyeonggi-do
- Coordinates: 37°14′59″N 126°58′50″E
- Operator: Korail
- Line: Suin–Bundang Line
- Platforms: 2
- Tracks: 4

Construction
- Structure type: Underground

Key dates
- September 12, 2020: Suin–Bundang Line opened
Location

Gosaek station (Korean: 고색역) is a railroad station on the Suin–Bundang Line of the Seoul Metropolitan Subway in Suwon, Gyeonggi Province, South Korea. It opened on 12 September 2020.

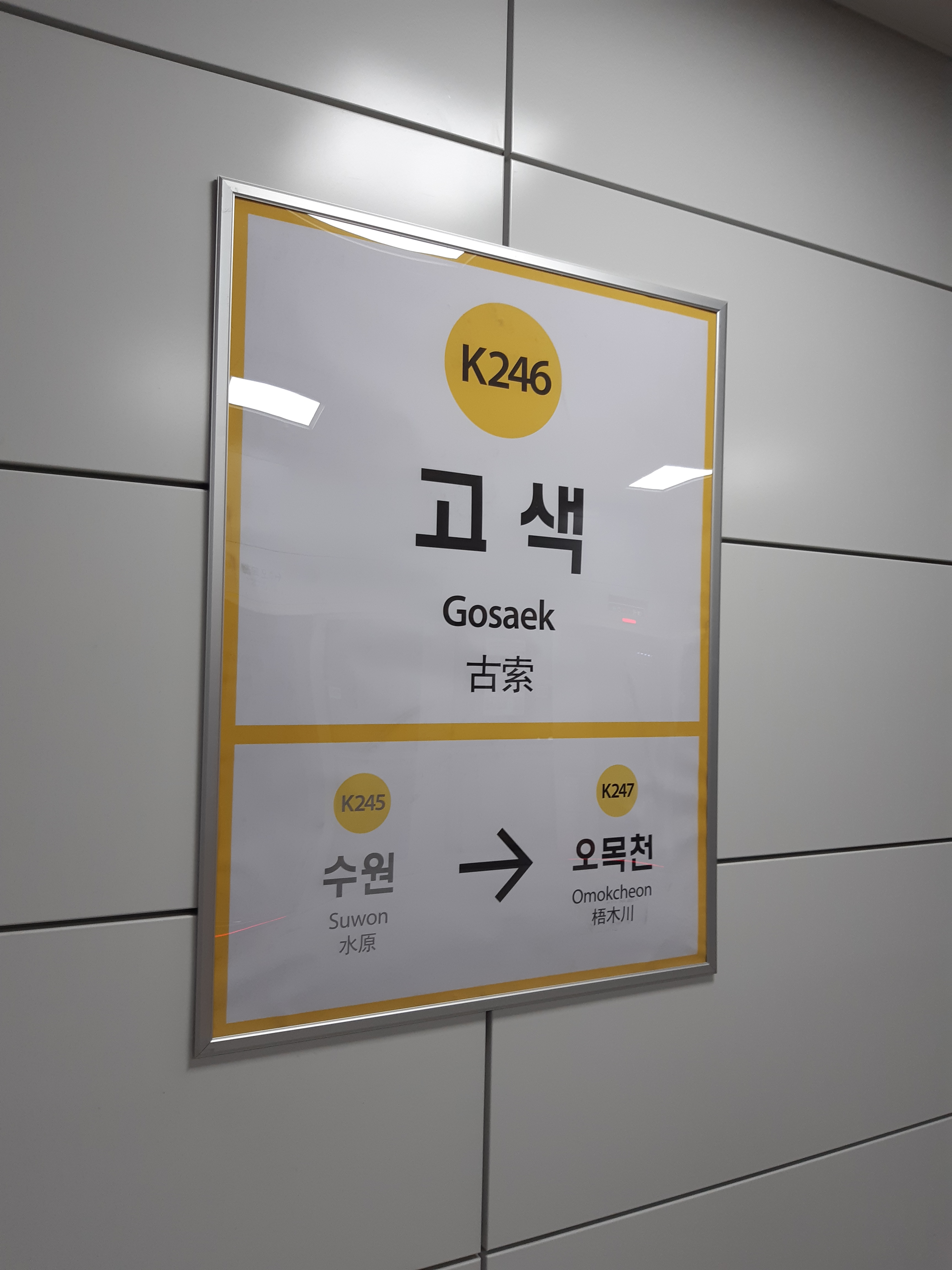

Preceding station	Seoul Metropolitan Subway	Following station
Suwon towards Cheongnyangni	Suin–Bundang Line	Omokcheon towards Incheon
Suwon towards Wangsimni	Suin–Bundang Line Bundang Express Line	Terminus
