= Suwon =

City in Gyeonggi, South Korea

- Special case city
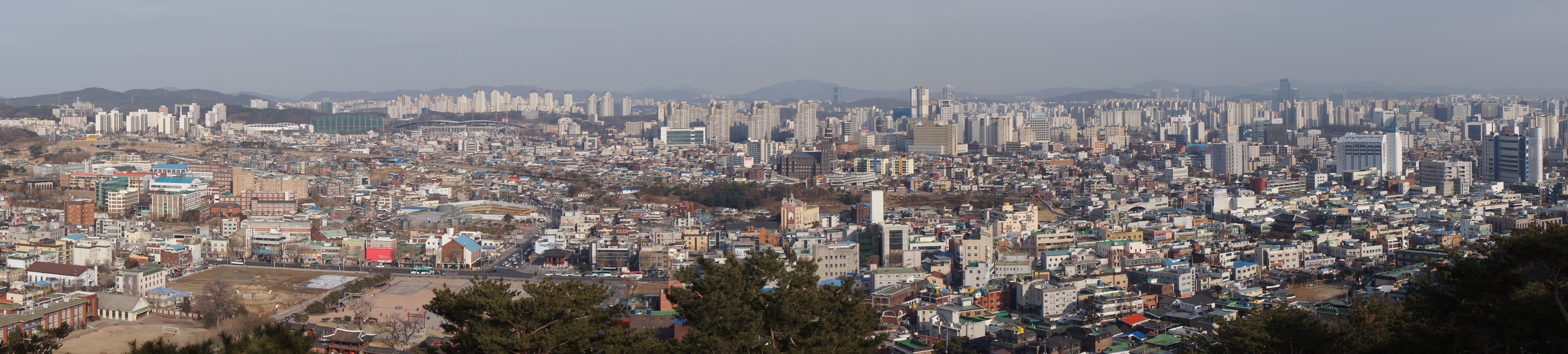
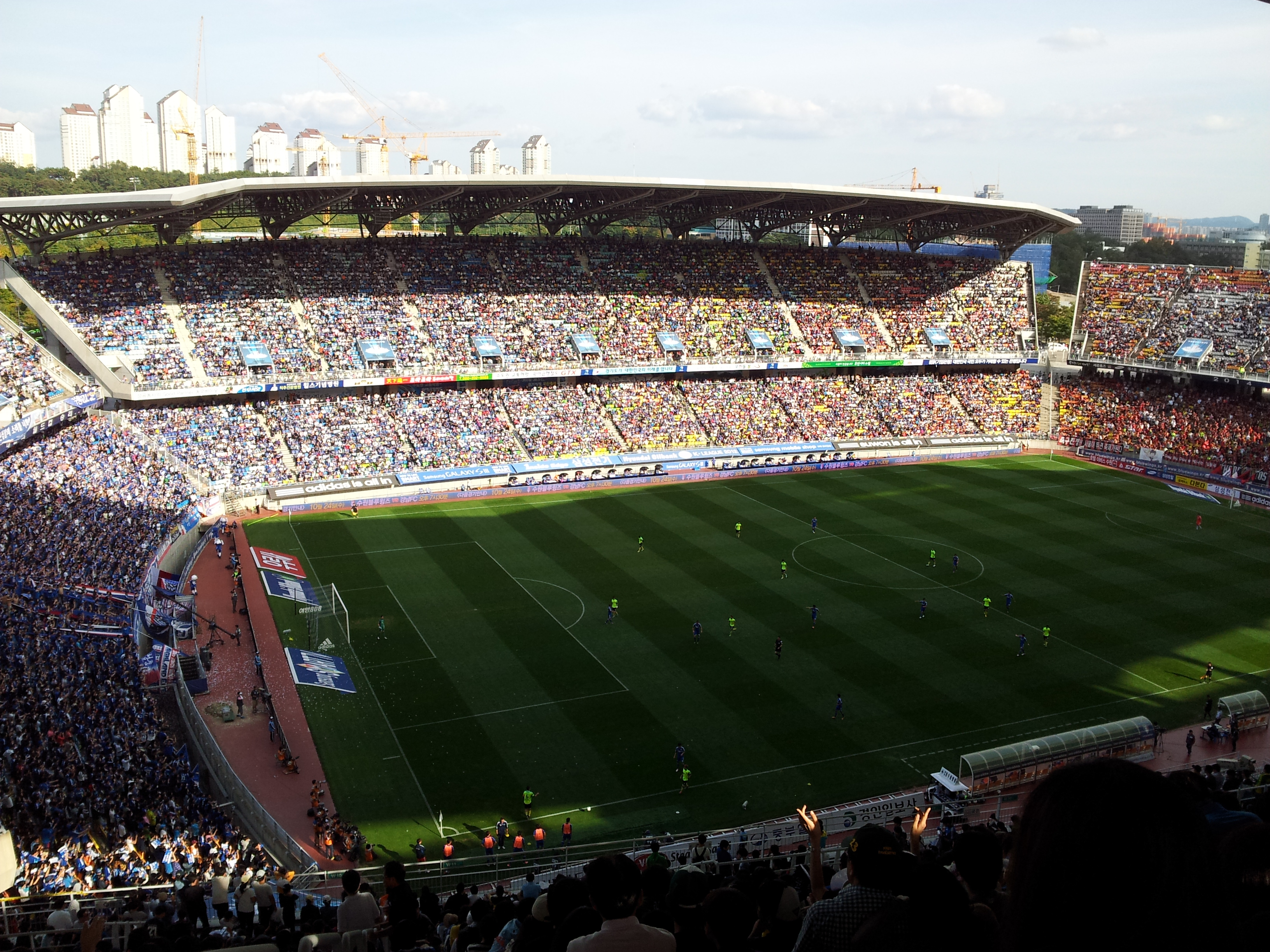
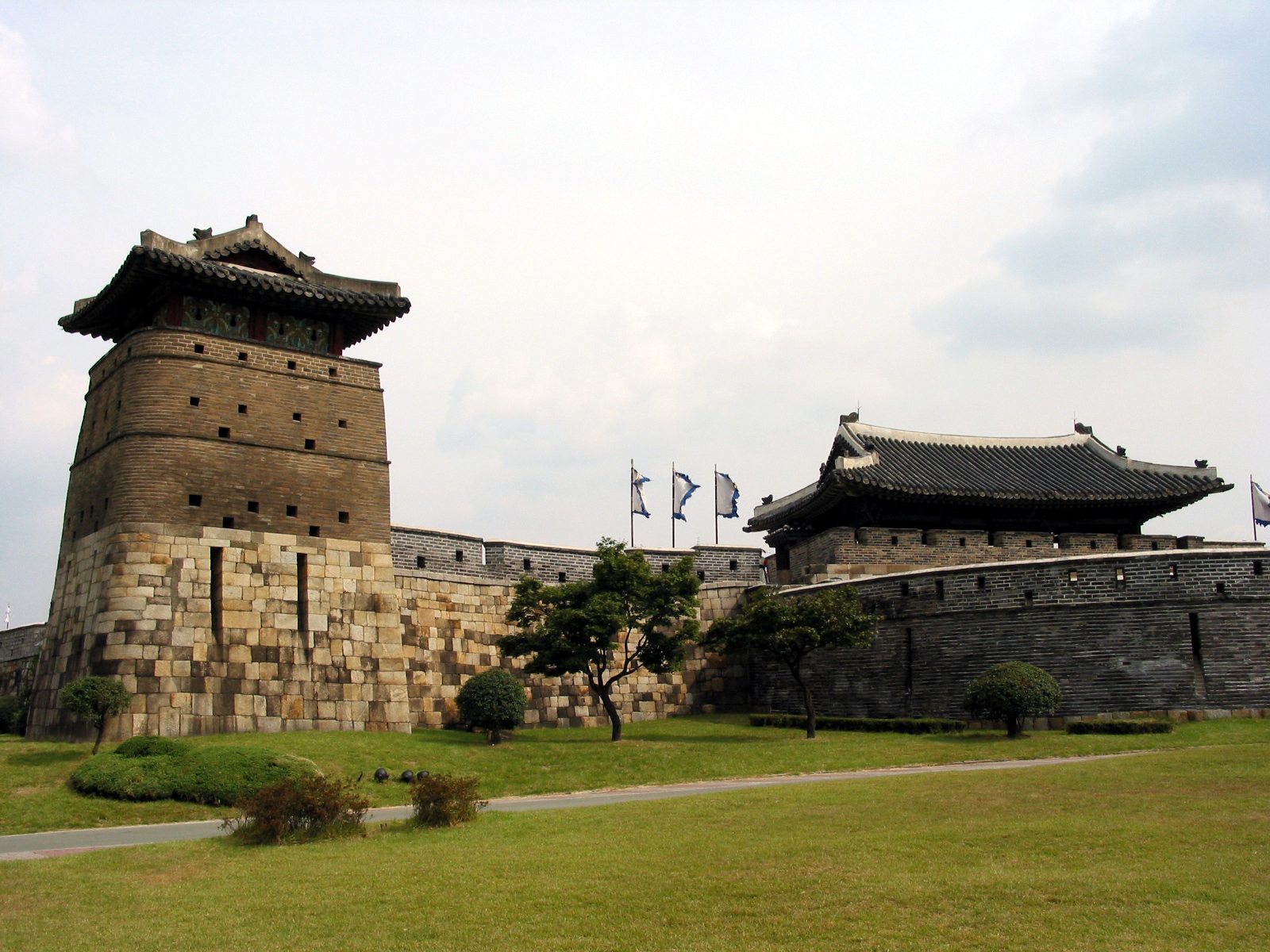
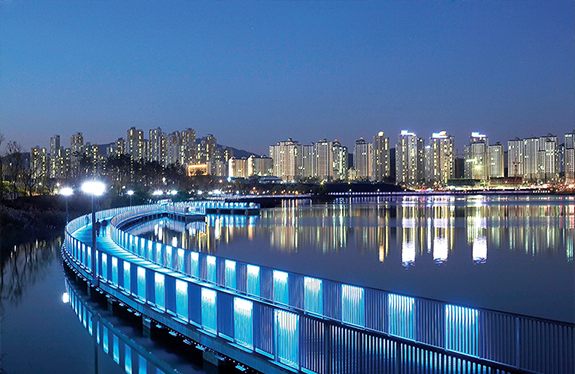
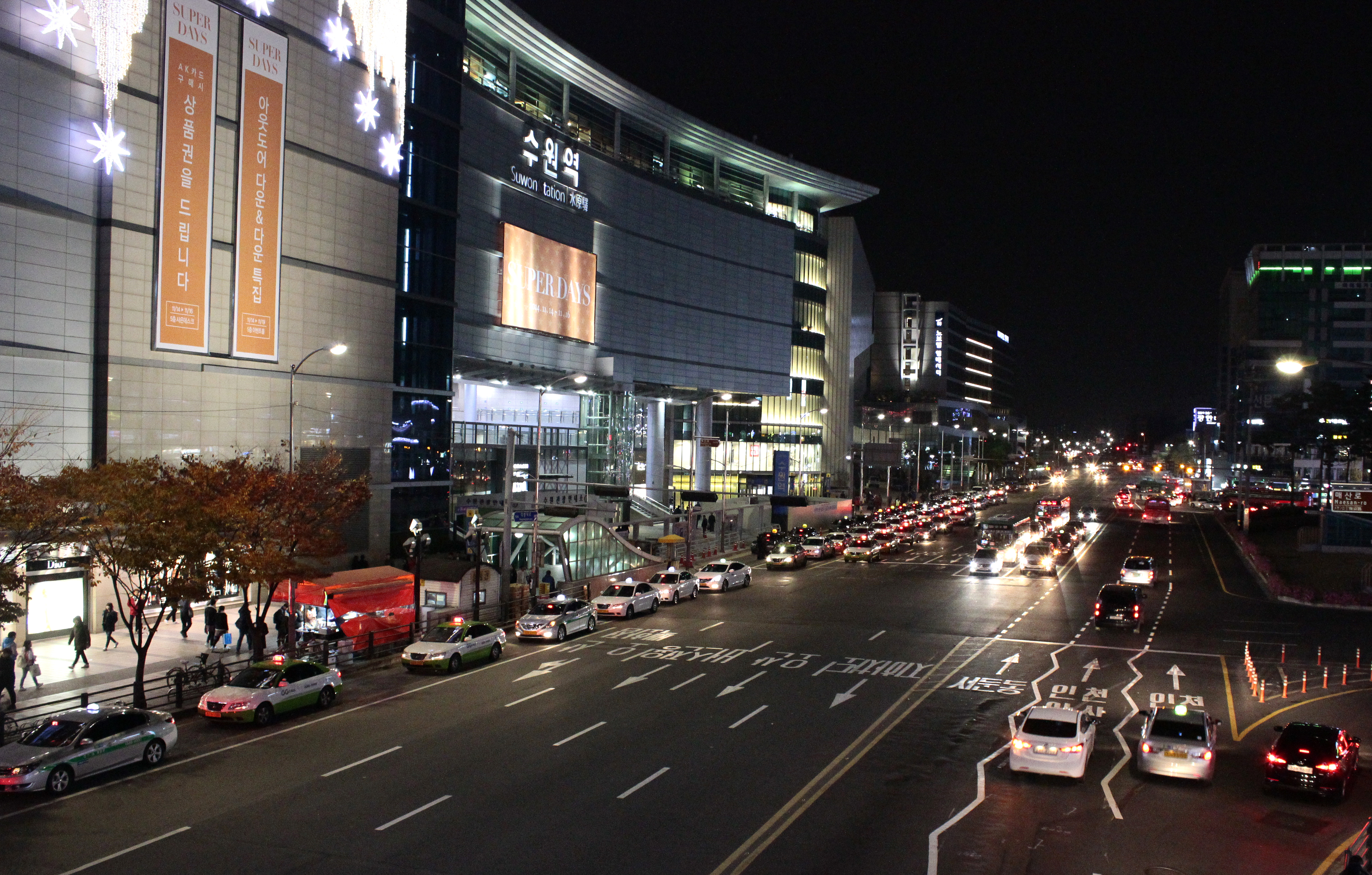
- From top, left to right: view of Suwon from Paldalsan Mountain, Suwon World Cup Stadium, Hwaseong Fortress, Gwanggyo Lake Park, Suwon Station

- Flag Emblem of Suwon

- Location in South Korea
- Coordinates: 37°16′N 127°01′E
- Country: South Korea
- Area: Gyeonggi Province (Seoul Metropolitan Area)
- Administrative divisions: 4 gu, 43 dong

Government
  - Type: Mayor-Council
  - Mayor: Lee Jae-jun (Democratic)
  - Council: Suwon City Council
  - Members of the Gyeonggi Provincial Council: List: Kim Jae Gui (DPK) 1st Electoral District, Suwon City; Kim Ju Seong (DPK) 2nd Electoral District, Suwon City; Kim Sang Hoi (DPK) 3rd Electoral District, Suwon City; Park Dong Hyeon (DPK) 4th Electoral District, Suwon City; Lee Seung Cheol (PPP)) 5th Electoral District, Suwon City; Kim Ho Kyum (DPK) 6th Electoral District, Suwon City; Oh Wan Seok (DPK) 7th Electoral District, Suwon City; An Hye Young (DPK) 8th Electoral District, Suwon City
  - Members of the National Assembly: List: Lee Chan-yeol (DPK) Electoral District A Baek Hye-ryeon (DPK) Electoral District B Kim Yeong-jin (DPK) Electoral District C Park Kwang-on (DPK) Electoral District D Kim Jin-pyo (DPK) Electoral District E

Area
  - Total: 121.04 km^{2} (46.73 sq mi)
- Highest elevation (Gwanggyosan): 582 m (1,909 ft)

Population (February 2026)
  - Total: 1,234,582
  - Density: 10,200/km^{2} (26,417/sq mi)
  - Dialect: Gyeonggi
- Postal code: 16200–16799
- Area code: +82-31-2xx
- Website: Suwon City Council

Korean name
- Hangul: 수원시
- Hanja: 水原市
- RR: Suwon-si
- MR: Suwŏn-si

Suwon (Korean: 수원; Korean pronunciation: [sʰu.wʌn]) is the largest city and capital of Gyeonggi Province, South Korea's most populous province. The city lies approximately 30 km (19 mi) south of the national capital, Seoul. With a population of 1.2 million, Suwon has more inhabitants than the metropolitan city of Ulsan, though it enjoys a lesser degree of self-governance as a 'special city'.

Traditionally known as the 'City of Filial Piety', modern Suwon retains a variety of historical landmarks. As a walled city, it is a popular destination for day-trippers from Seoul, with the wall itself—Hwaseong Fortress—receiving 1½ million visits in 2015.

Suwon plays an important economic role as it is home to Samsung Electronics, Korea's largest and most profitable company. The company's research and development centre is in Yeongtong District in eastern Suwon, where its headquarters have also been located since 2016. Samsung's prominence in Suwon is clear: the company is partnered with Sungkyunkwan University, which has a campus in the city; it also owns the professional football team Suwon Samsung Bluewings. This team has won the K League four times and the Asian Super Cup twice. The city is also home to the K League 2 team Suwon FC and the KBO League baseball team KT Wiz.

Suwon houses several well-known universities, most notably Sungkyunkwan University and Ajou University. It is served by three expressways, the national railway network, and three lines on the Seoul Metropolitan Subway.

== Name ==
Suwon literally means "water source". While the area has gone by different names since antiquity, almost all share this meaning. The name Suwon descends from the Proto–Three Kingdoms period statelet Mosuguk. After this period, the area (including modern-day Hwaseong) was called Maehol, Maetkol, or Mulgol (매홀; 맷골; 물골; 買忽). In 757 CE, the name was changed to Susŏng-gun (수성군; 水城郡; lit. 'Susŏng County') to distinguish it from another territory with a similar-sounding name. In 940, the name was changed again to Su-ju (수주; 水州; lit. 'Su Province'). In the 11th century, it went by either Susŏng (different Hanja: 隋城) or Hannam (한남; 漢南; lit. 'south of Han'), and in 1310, it finally received the name Suwon.

In English, Suwon often used to be spelt 'Sou-wen'.

== History ==
=== Early history ===
Suwon has been inhabited since at the latest the early Bronze Age: artifacts such as pottery, sculptures, and arrowheads dating from the Bronze Age to the early Iron Age have been found in the area, including on Yeogisan, which is now a monument of Gyeonggi Province.

During the Three Kingdoms of Korea period, the area was a territory of the statelet Mosuguk, part of the Mahan confederacy. It came under the influence of Goguryeo in the late 5th century CE before becoming part of Unified Silla (668–935). Suwon then fell to Goryeo after a military campaign led by King Taejo.

In the 13th and 14th centuries, the area was promoted, demoted, merged, and made part of various administrative districts. It then became a part of Joseon upon the dynasty's founding, and in 1395 it was made an administrative centre of Gyeonggi Province.

Until the late 18th century, Suwon was administered from modern-day Annyeong-dong at the foot of Hwasan—a hill in Hwasan-dong, Hwaseong. In 1796, King Jeongjo relocated Central Suwon to its current location at the foot of Paldalsan, and to protect this new city, he commanded the building of Hwaseong Fortress—a protective wall around the town.

The town steadily grew, and an 1899 administrative report recorded a population of 49,708 people in 12,579 households.

=== Japanese colonial period ===
During the 1910–1945 Japanese colonial period, a number of prominent Korean independence activists came from or operated in Suwon. Kim Se-hwan and Yi Sŏn-gyŏng (이선경; 李善卿) were both arrested for their activities.

=== Liberation to Korean War ===
On 15 August 1949, Suwon was promoted from a county to a city, with some of its former territory made into Hwaseong County.

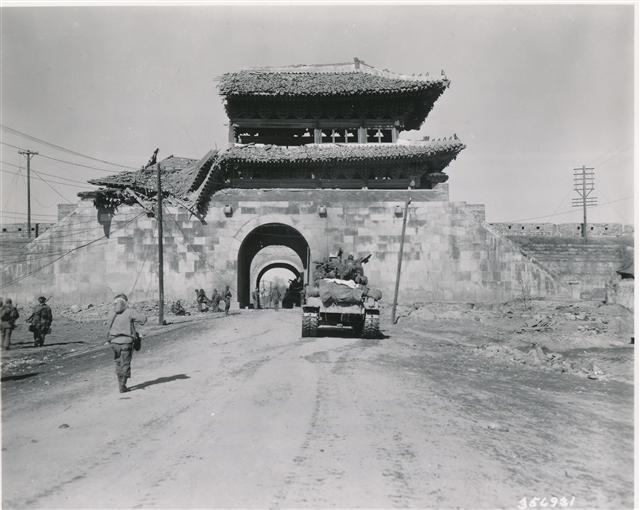
Hwaseong Fortress in the Korean War

When the Korean War began, the United States Air Force 49th Fighter Wing, then stationed in Japan, was sent to Korea with an initial mission of evacuating civilians from Suwon and Gimpo. While on this mission, on 27 June 1950, US planes in Suwon were attacked by North Korean fighters. The ensuing Battle of Suwon Airfield became the first aerial combat of the war. Suwon Airfield was attacked again two days later while General Douglas MacArthur was on site. Though the US repelled both attacks, Suwon fell to the advancing North Koreans one week later, on 4 July 1950. The following day saw the first land conflict between United States and North Korean forces, the Battle of Osan.

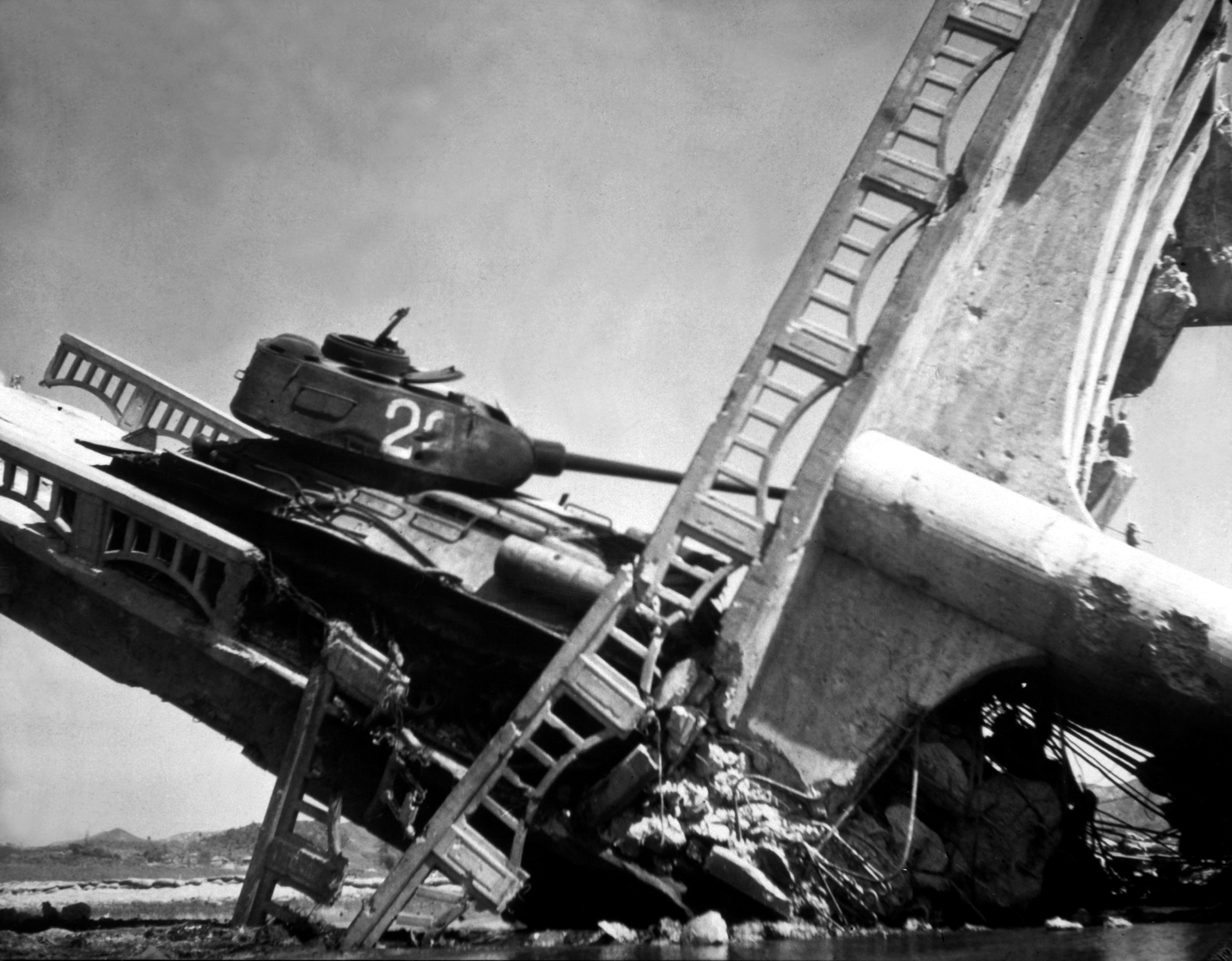
North Korean T-34-85 caught on a bridge south of Suwon by US attack aircraft in the Korean War

North Korean troops were not the only threat to life: in the early days of the war, southern authorities feared left-leaning civilians, and many were killed. Suwon was a site of such killings: eyewitness account from US intelligence officer Donald Nichols places Suwon as the location of a massacre of approximately 1,800 in late June 1950.

Suwon was retaken, fell again to the North, before being recaptured for the final time. In total, the city changed hands four times during the war.

While under southern authority, Suwon hosted forces from several countries. For example, on 16 December 1950, the Greek Expeditionary Force relocated from Busan to Suwon, attached to the US 1st Cavalry Division. The city also appeared strategically important, as in late 1951, the US Air Force's top fighter pilot Gabby Gabreski was placed in charge of Suwon Air Base.

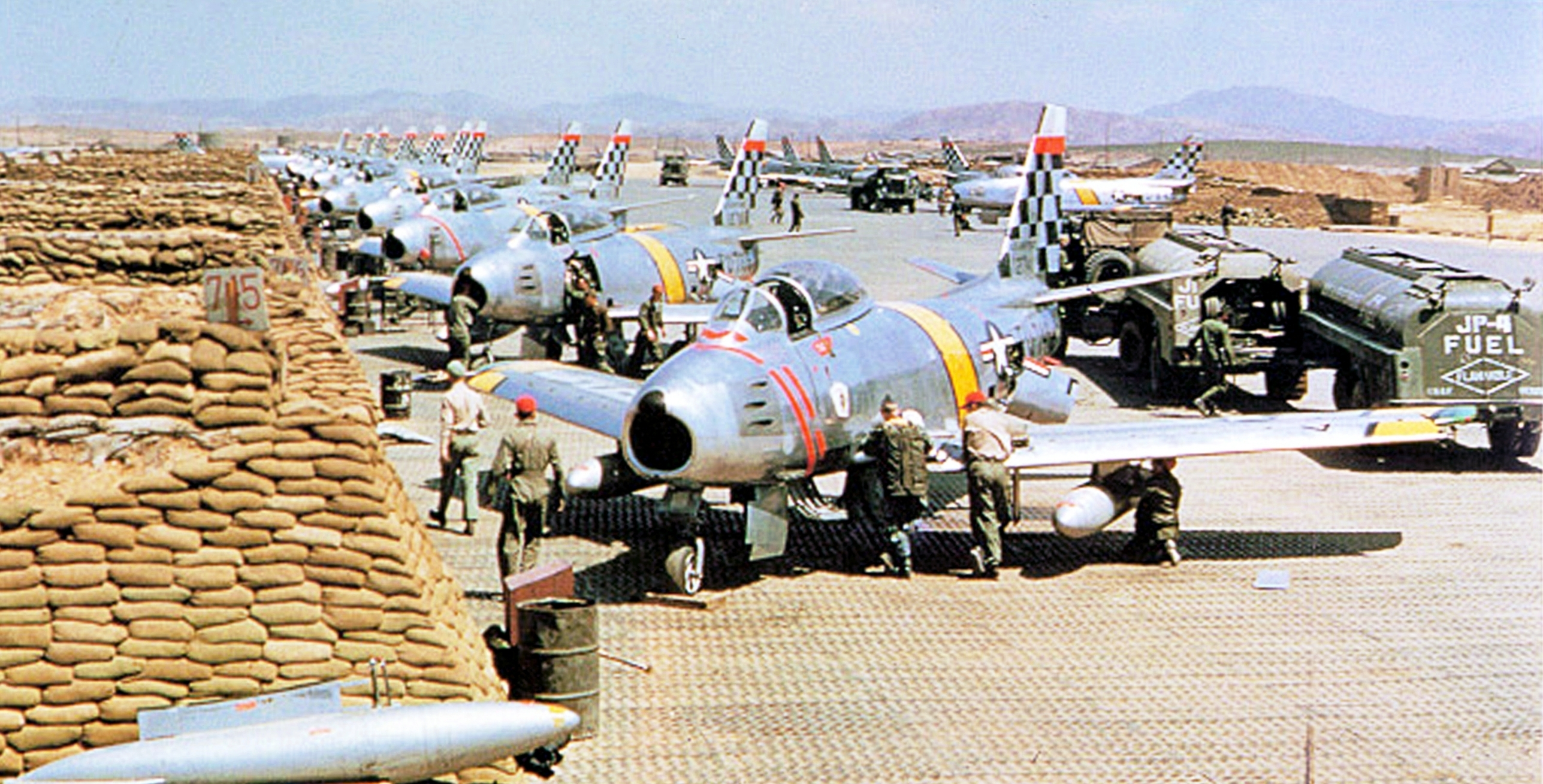
US 51st Fighter Interceptor Wing at Suwon Air Base, 1952

A memorial to French forces was erected in 1974 near the Yeongdong Expressway's North Suwon exit. A 2013 renovation was funded by the French government.

=== Recent history ===
In 1964, the headquarters of Gyeonggi Province began a process of relocation from Seoul to Suwon. Seoul had left the province in 1949. When the construction of the headquarters was completed on 23 June 1967, the date was set as a new annual holiday: Suwon Citizen's Day (수원시민의 날). The Hwahong Cultural Festival (now Hwaseong Cultural Festival) was established to celebrate the occasion.

Suwon has experienced a number of administrative territory changes since the 1960s. In 1963, Suwon expanded greatly as 20 villages were incorporated from Hwaseong-gun. In 1983, two more villages were acquired from Yongin. In 1987, Suwon expanded westwards, acquiring another two villages from Hwaseong. Gwonseon District and Paldal District were established in 1988. It received more territory from Hwaseong and Yongin in 1994, and again from Hwaseong in 1995. It established Yeongtong District in 2003.

In preparation for the construction of a new planned city Gwanggyo, there were two-way exchanges of land between Suwon and Yongin in 2007 and 2019. Suwon's most recent land exchange occurred in 2020, when it swapped some land parcels with Hwaseong.

== Geography ==
Suwon lies in the north of the Gyeonggi plain, 30 km (19 mi) south of the national capital, Seoul. It is bordered by the cities of Uiwang to the north-west, Yongin to the east, Hwaseong to the south-west, and Ansan to the west. Suwon is near the Yellow Sea coast: at its closest point, on the 239-metre (784 ft) Chilbosan ridge to the west, Suwon lies 18.2 km (11.3 mi) from Ueumdo in Sihwa Lake, a coastal inlet cordoned off to drive the world's largest tidal power station. Suwon is primarily situated in a basin-like terrain surrounded by low hills such as Gwanggyosan to the north, with the historic Suwon Hwaseong Fortress serving as a central landmark that reflects the city's unique radial urban structure developed since the late 18th century.

=== Geology and topography ===
Suwon is primarily composed of Precambrian metamorphic rock. It has amphibolites that intrude through these, and also granites from the Mesozoic Era.

Most of Suwon is composed of biotite granite (Jbgr) from the Jurassic period. This granite is centred on Paldalsan. A form of Daebo granite, this rock is distributed through Homaesil-dong, Geumgok-dong, Dangsu-dong, Seryu-dong, Seodun-dong, Gwonseon-dong, and other areas. Its main constituent minerals are quartz, plagioclase, orthotic, biotite, and amphibole.

Precambrian biotite gneiss (PCEbgn) is found in northern Suwon, specifically Pajang-dong, Gwanggyo-dong, Woncheon-dong, and Maetan-dong. Visible rocks here are composed of quartz, feldspar, biotite, amphibole, and muscovite; and are generally dark grey or dark green. Mesozoic biotite granite intrudes through these.

Precambrian quartzo-feldspathic gneiss (PCEqgn) is distributed in some mountainous areas in Hagwanggyo-dong and Sanggwanggyo-dong in northern Suwon. This gneiss has primarily undergone silicification, and is mainly composed of quartz, feldspar, biotite, and muscovite. It is grey, grey-brown, and white.

Suwon's single tectonic fault splits from the Singal Fault in Iui-dong, creating the Woncheonri Stream. The stream follows the fault through Ha-dong, Woncheon-dong, and Maetan-dong till it joins the Hwangguji Stream in Annyeong-dong, Hwaseong. This is a 20 km-long vertical fault running SSW, eventually to the Yellow Sea. In Suwon, biotite gneiss and biotite granite are brought into contact by the fault.

While the low-lying fault sits in the south of Suwon, the north is hillier: the city's highest point is Gwanggyosan (582 m (1,909 ft)) on the border with Yongin.

=== Streams and lakes ===
Most of Suwon's streams originate on Gwanggyosan or other nearby peaks. Since the city is bounded to the north by Gwanggyosan, to the west by Chilbosan, and to the east by other hills, the streams, chiefly the Hwanggujicheon, Suwoncheon, Seohocheon, and Woncheollicheon, flow southwards. After merging, they eventually empty into the Yellow Sea at Asan Bay. The entirety of Suwon is drained in this manner.

Several of Suwon's streams feature lakes. Since there are few natural lakes on the Korean mainland, Suwon's lakes are small reservoirs. These 11 reservoirs are Chungmanje, otherwise known as Seoho (서호) near Hwaseo Station; Irwol Reservoir (일원 저수지) near Sungkyunkwan University; Bambat Reservoir (밤밭 저수지) near Sungkyunkwan University Station; Manseokkeo, otherwise known as Irwang Reservoir (일왕 저수지) in Manseok Park; Pajang Reservoir (파장 저수지) near the North Suwon exit of the Yeongdong Expressway; Gwanggyo Reservoir (광교 저수지) and Hagwanggyo Reservoir (하광교 소류지) at the foot of Gwanggyosan; Woncheon and Sindae Reservoirs (원천 저수지, 신대 저수지) in Gwanggyo Lake Park; and Geumgok Reservoir (금곡 저수지), a small lake at the foot of Chilbosan. Irwang Reservoir (Manseokkeo) has been designated a world heritage site for irrigation. Wangsong Reservoir (왕송 저수지), on the border with Uiwang, used to be partly in Suwon, but after controversial boundary changes, it is now entirely in Uiwang.

=== Climate ===
Suwon has both a humid continental climate (Köppen: Dfa), and a humid subtropical climate (Köppen: Cwa).

The city is prone to occasional flooding: the 1998 flood caused the death of a US soldier, and 145 mm (5.7 in) of rain fell in 24 hours in 2010.

Climate data for Suwon (1991–2020 normals, 1964–2023 extremes)
Month	Jan	Feb	Mar	Apr	May	Jun	Jul	Aug	Sep	Oct	Nov	Dec	Year
Record high °C (°F)	15.3 (59.5)	19.3 (66.7)	25.0 (77.0)	30.5 (86.9)	33.2 (91.8)	34.0 (93.2)	37.5 (99.5)	39.3 (102.7)	34.0 (93.2)	29.0 (84.2)	25.8 (78.4)	17.8 (64.0)	39.3 (102.7)
Mean daily maximum °C (°F)	2.8 (37.0)	5.6 (42.1)	11.3 (52.3)	18.2 (64.8)	23.6 (74.5)	27.5 (81.5)	29.3 (84.7)	30.3 (86.5)	26.4 (79.5)	20.4 (68.7)	12.5 (54.5)	4.9 (40.8)	17.7 (63.9)
Daily mean °C (°F)	−2.1 (28.2)	0.3 (32.5)	5.7 (42.3)	12.0 (53.6)	17.6 (63.7)	22.2 (72.0)	25.3 (77.5)	26.0 (78.8)	21.4 (70.5)	14.6 (58.3)	7.2 (45.0)	0.1 (32.2)	12.5 (54.5)
Mean daily minimum °C (°F)	−6.6 (20.1)	−4.5 (23.9)	0.6 (33.1)	6.4 (43.5)	12.3 (54.1)	17.9 (64.2)	22.1 (71.8)	22.7 (72.9)	17.1 (62.8)	9.4 (48.9)	2.4 (36.3)	−4.2 (24.4)	8.0 (46.4)
Record low °C (°F)	−24.8 (−12.6)	−25.8 (−14.4)	−11.3 (11.7)	−4.7 (23.5)	2.3 (36.1)	7.8 (46.0)	13.2 (55.8)	13.0 (55.4)	3.6 (38.5)	−3.6 (25.5)	−12.6 (9.3)	−24.4 (−11.9)	−25.8 (−14.4)
Average precipitation mm (inches)	18.1 (0.71)	28.3 (1.11)	40.7 (1.60)	71.6 (2.82)	95.0 (3.74)	122.9 (4.84)	385.1 (15.16)	296.3 (11.67)	133.5 (5.26)	54.1 (2.13)	48.9 (1.93)	25.8 (1.02)	1,320.3 (51.98)
Average precipitation days (≥ 0.1 mm)	6.7	6.2	7.0	8.0	8.6	9.6	15.4	14.0	8.6	6.1	9.0	8.3	107.5
Average snowy days	6.9	5.3	2.2	0.1	0.0	0.0	0.0	0.0	0.0	0.0	1.8	6.8	23.1
Average relative humidity (%)	63.0	61.9	62.2	62.1	66.1	71.4	79.9	77.6	73.2	69.8	67.9	64.4	68.3
Mean monthly sunshine hours	174.3	178.7	205.7	214.5	229.7	195.0	138.2	168.7	184.6	208.9	162.5	166.2	2,227
Percentage possible sunshine	54.0	56.2	53.4	54.6	50.4	42.8	30.5	39.5	48.8	57.4	51.6	53.4	48.6
Source: Korea Meteorological Administration (percent sunshine 1981–2010)

=== Administrative divisions ===
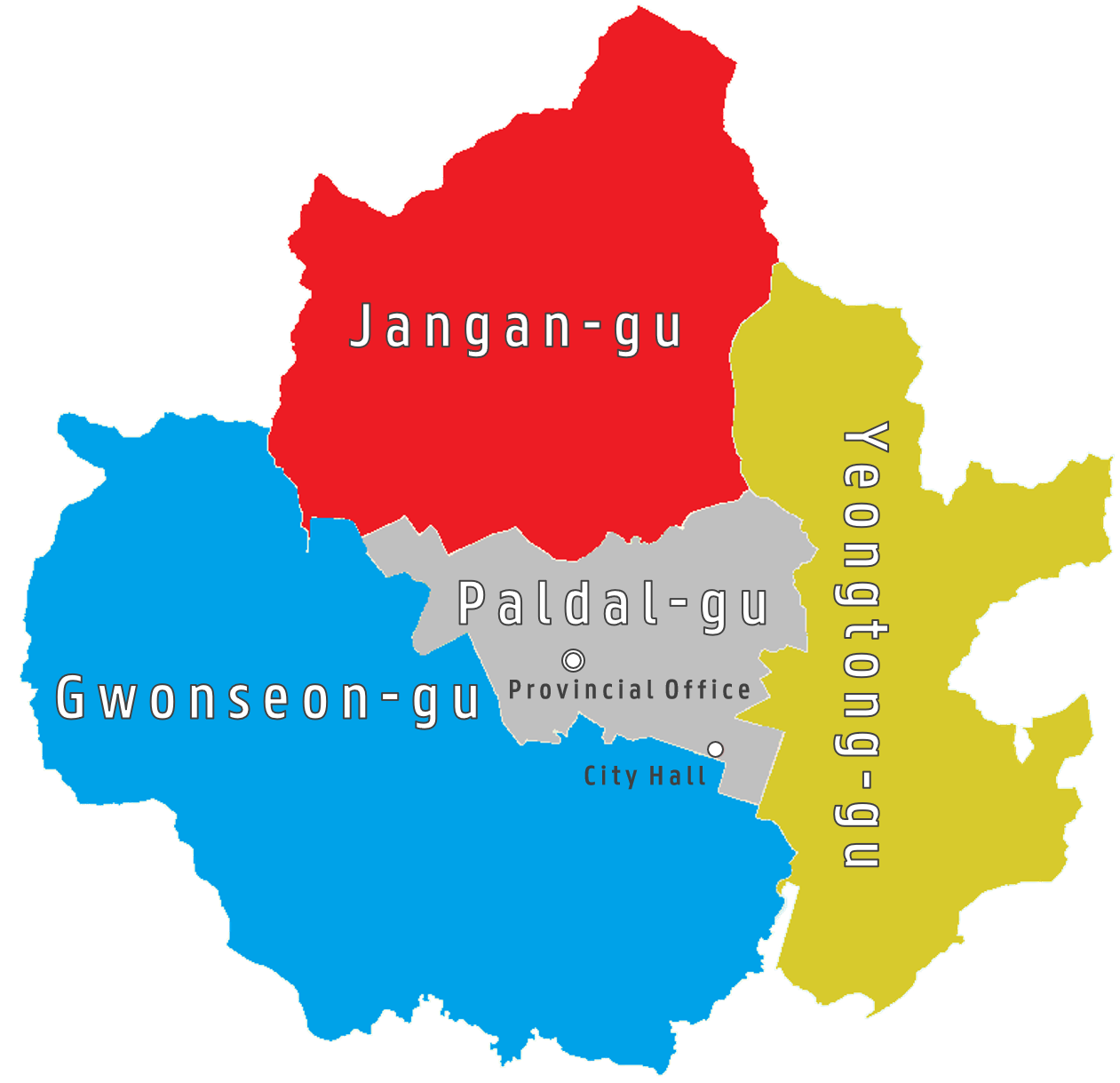
Districts of Suwon

The city is composed of four gu (districts). Jangan District (장안구) and Gwonseon District (권선구) were established on 1 July 1988. On 1 February 1993, parts of Jangan District and Gwonseon District became a new district, Paldal District (팔달구). The newest district is Yeongtong District (영통구), which separated from Paldal District on 24 November 2003. These districts are in turn divided into 42 dong.

Suwon has several new 'towns', e.g., Homaesil and Gwanggyo. The latter is perhaps the most notable of these: the first stage of its construction was completed in 2011.

== Demography ==
Historical population
Year	Pop.	±%
1970	167,201	—
1980	310,476	+85.7%
1990	661,396	+113.0%
2000	946,704	+43.1%
2010	1,071,913	+13.2%
2020	1,210,150	+12.9%

Suwon is 50.3% male (49.7% female), and 2.9% foreign. On average, there are 2.3 residents per household. Further details for each district are shown below (figures from 31 December 2023).

	Total people	Korean males	Korean females	Korean (total)	Foreign males	Foreign females	Foreign (total)
Suwon (total)	1,233,424	602,346	594,911	1,197,257	17,837	18,330	36,167
Gwonseon District	375,574	184,970	181,197	366,167	4,558	4,849	9,407
Jangan District	277,645	136,145	134,704	270,849	3,312	3,484	6,796
Paldal District	208,791	99,290	97,923	197,213	5,917	5,661	11,578
Yeongtong District	371,414	181,941	181,017	363,028	4,050	4,336	8,386

=== Religion ===
The Catholic Diocese of Suwon was created in 1963 by Pope Paul VI. The cathedral—St Joseph's—is at 39 Imok-ro, Jeongja-dong.

Suwon is the birthplace of the former president of the Baptist World Alliance, Kim Janghwan (Billy Kim). who founded the Suwon Central Baptist Church, though this is located in Yongin.

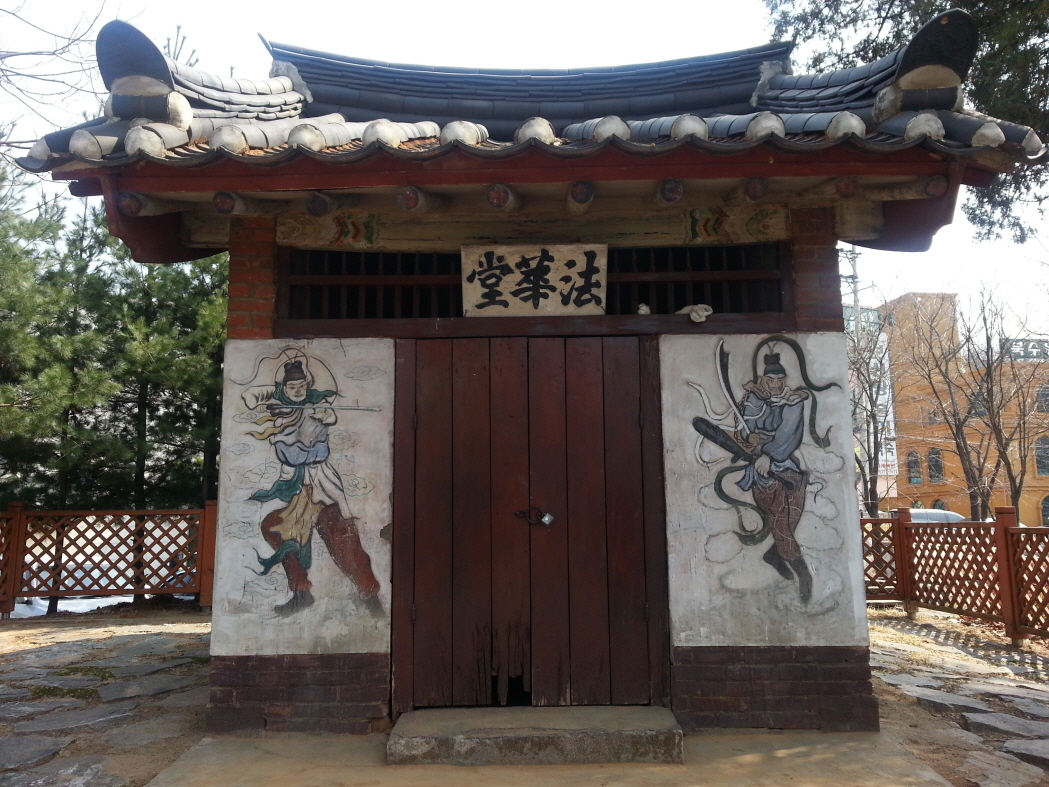
Mireukdang

Mireukdang (미륵당), a small shrine to Maitreya, is located in Pajang-dong. This has a religious basis fusing Buddhism and traditional local religions.

=== Crime ===
Illegal dumping of household waste has been a problem in Suwon, and the city council has addressed this by increasing urban greenery. This approach appears to have reduced the scale of the problem.

Suwon crime statistics, 2021
Category	Crime	Number
Property crime	Larceny (Theft)	4,202
Property crime	Possession of stolen property	8
Property crime	Fraud	6,183
Property crime	Embezzlement	1,277
Property crime	Breach of trust	70
Property crime	Destruction	1,510
Violent crime (serious)	Murder	16
Violent crime (serious)	Robbery	7
Violent crime (serious)	Arson	28
Violent crime (serious)	Sexual assault	934
Violent crime (lesser)	Violence	2,988
Violent crime (lesser)	Injury	429
Violent crime (lesser)	Intimidation	540
Violent crime (lesser)	Extortion	159
Violent crime (lesser)	Kidnapping, abduction	4
Violent crime (lesser)	False arrest, confinement	33
Violent crime (lesser)	Violation of The Punishment of Violence, Etc. Act (e.g., burglary)	29
Violent crime (lesser)	Violation of The Punishment of Violences, Etc. Act (e g., Formation of illegal organizations, and such activities)	0
Forgery	Currency	7
Forgery	Valuable securities, revenue stamp, postage	2
Forgery	Documents	228
Forgery	Seal	11
Public official crime	Abandonment of duties	18
Public official crime	Abuse of authority	30
Public official crime	Receiving bribes	2
Public official crime	Giving bribes	0
Crime against morality	Gambling, lotteries	1,342
Crime against morality	Deceased person	1
Crime against morality	Other obscene acts	79
Negligence	Inflicting bodily injury or death through negligence	52
Negligence	Inflicting bodily injury or death through occupational negligence	47
Negligence	Fire caused by negligence	57
Misc.	Defamation	759
Misc.	Obstruction of rights	134
Misc.	Credit business, auction	438
Misc.	Trespass	439
Misc.	Violation of secrecy	4
Misc.	Abandonment	5
Misc.	Traffic obstruction	10
Misc.	Obstruction of official duties	186
Misc.	Escape, harbouring criminals	4
Misc.	Perjury, destruction, and concealment of evidence	83
Misc.	False accusation	108
Misc.	Breach of the peace	4
Misc.	Insurrection	0
Misc.	Drinking water crimes	0
Misc.	Water use crimes	0

== Education ==
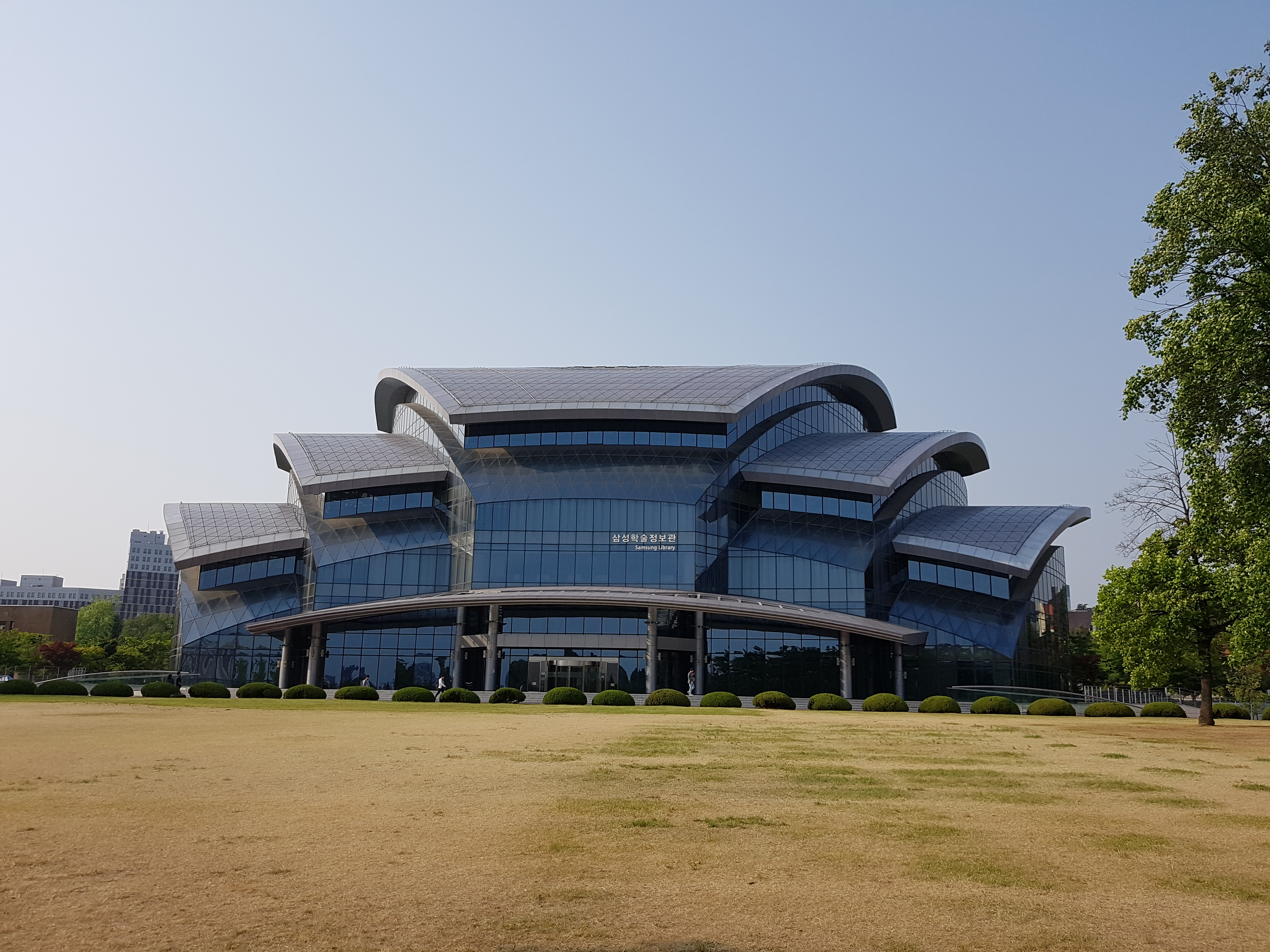
Sungkyunkwan University library

There are several universities and colleges in Suwon. These include Sungkyunkwan University's Natural Sciences Campus, Kyonggi University, Ajou University, Dongnam Health University, Gukje Cyber University, Hapdong Theological Seminary, and Suwon Women's University. Despite their names, the University of Suwon and Suwon Science College are not actually in Suwon, but in neighboring Hwaseong. Seoul National University's agriculture campus was located in Suwon until 2005; it is now in Seoul.

Suwon has 44 high schools, 57 middle schools, 100 primary schools, and 180 kindergartens. Three schools are dedicated to special education: Jahye School (47 Subong-ro, Tap-dong), Suwon Seokwang School (517 Jangan-ro, Imok-dong), and Areum School (32 Gwanggyo-ro, Iui-dong). Special education is also provided in some regular schools, e.g., Suwonbuk Middle School (37 Gwanggyosan-ro, Yeonghwa-dong). There is also a centre for lifelong learning at Kyemyung High School (88 Jangan-ro 496 beon-gil, Imok-dong), and there are two international schools in the city: Gyeonggi Suwon International School and Suwon Chinese International School (수원화교중정소학교; 水原華僑中正小學).

Schools and kindergartens in Suwon
		Gwonseon District	Jangan District	Paldal District	Yeongtong District	Total
Kindergarten	Public (dedicated k'gtn)	3	2	1	5	11
Kindergarten	Public (in elem. sch.)	32	19	11	23	85
Kindergarten	Private	29	21	10	24	84
Elementary school	Public	33	22	15	28	98
Elementary school	Private	0	0	0	2	2
Middle School	Public	13	13	5	20	51
Middle School	Private	1	0	4	1	6
High School	Public	7	9	3	12	31
High School	Private	2	3	8	0	13

== Environment ==
Throughout South Korea, water management is a challenge. Suwon is 11% self-sufficient in its use of water, and plans to increase this to 50% through rainwater harvesting, including building retention facilities; and by treating and reusing sewage.

Air pollution in Suwon appears to be from a range of industrial and other sources, with origins of coarse particulate matter (PM_{10}) shown in the pie chart.

PM_{10} sources on the Suwon–Yongin border:
1. Soil (25.4%)
2. Secondary sulphate (produced in the atmosphere by photochemical processes acting on sulphuric compounds) (22.1%)
3. Industry and oil combustion (13.8%)
4. Secondary nitrate (produced by oxidation of some volatile organic compounds) (12.3%)
5. Diesel emissions (12.1%)
6. Gasoline emissions (5.60%)
7. Sodium-rich sources (5.60%)
8. Waste incineration (3.10%)

== Economy ==
The largest employer in Suwon is Samsung Electronics, which was founded in the city in 1969. Its headquarters remain in Suwon, located today with the company's large R&D complex in Maetan-dong. Samsung's presence in the city can be seen through its sponsorship of local sports teams such as Suwon Samsung Bluewings Football Club and two of the oldest domestic basketball teams—Samsung Thunders and Samsung Life Blueminx—both of which have since left Suwon. Other major companies in Suwon include SK Chemical, Samsung SDI, and Samsung Electro-Mechanics.

=== Samsung Electronics ===
On September 1, 1973, Samsung Electronics moved its headquarters to Suwon from Euljiro, Seoul. This was to establish an electronic components facility process with Japan's SANYO Electric Co., Ltd. As a result, the status of Suwon City improved along with the growth of Samsung Electronics.

== Landmarks ==
=== Hwaseong Fortress ===
Hwaseong Fortress, built under the orders of King Jeongjo in 1796, is listed as a UNESCO World Heritage Site. The entire city used to be encircled by the fortress walls, but Suwon has long since expanded far beyond this boundary. There are four main gates in the walls, and Haenggung Palace lies in the centre of the fortress.

Hwaseong was built under the guidance of philosopher Chŏng Yagyong. Workers were paid for their labor for one of the first times in Korea's history, corvée labor having been common previously. Construction details were meticulously recorded in the text Hwaseong Seongyeok Uigwe (화성 성역 의궤). This document was invaluable after the Korean War: reconstruction efforts from 1964 to the present day have relied heavily on this.

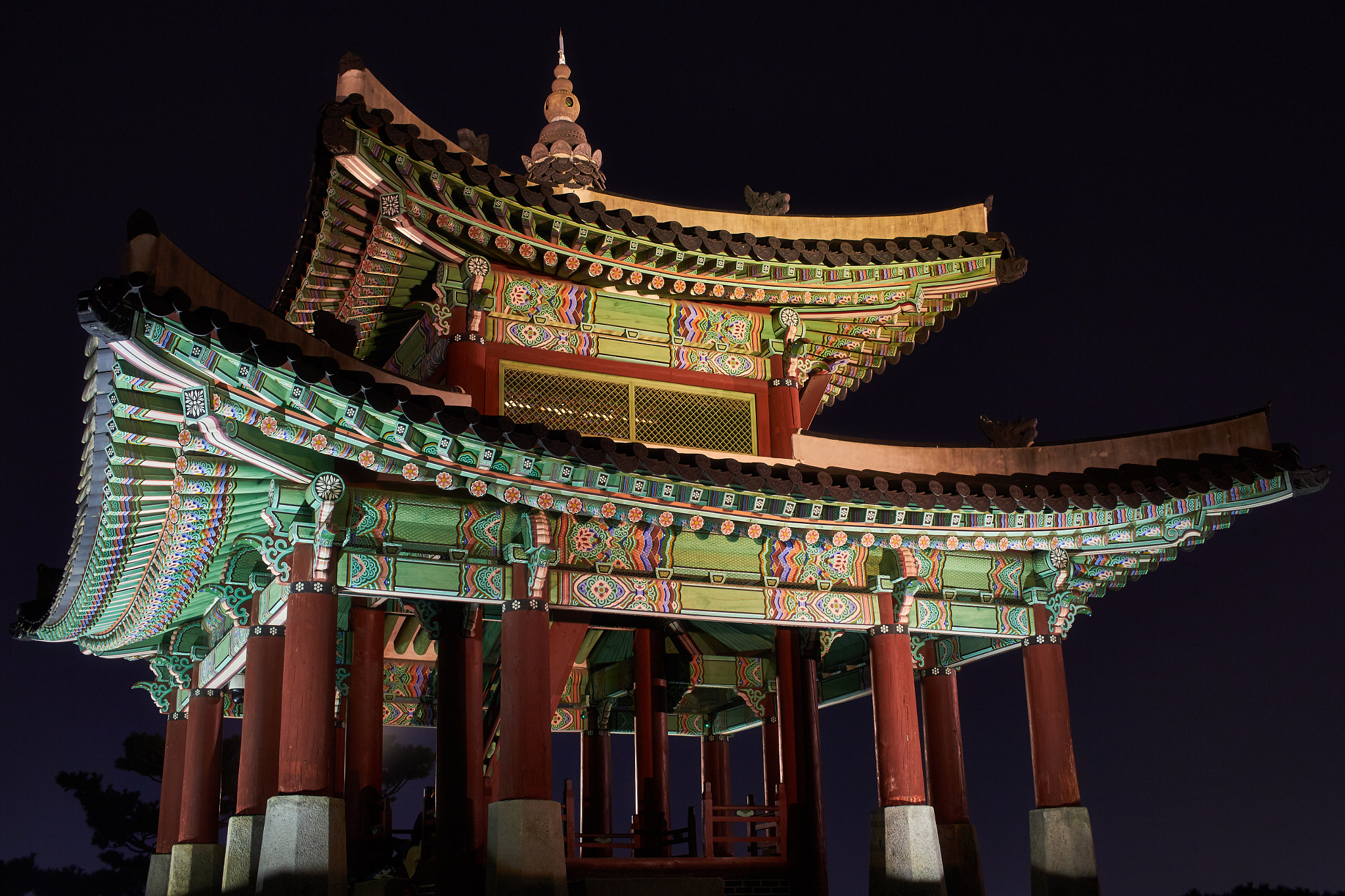
Seojangdae

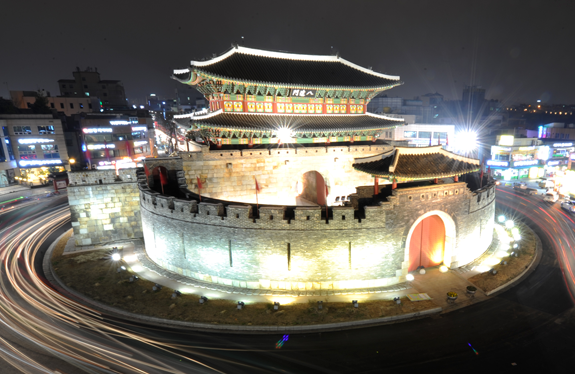
Paldalmun (South Gate)

=== Hyanggyo ===
Suwon Hyanggyo (수원향교; 水原鄕校) was a government-run school and Confucian ceremonial centre during the Goryeo and Joseon periods. During the Joseon Dynasty, it was the largest and oldest state school in Gyeonggi Province. The school was originally built in 1291 beside Hwasan in Wau-ri, Hwaseong-gun. It was moved to its current location at 107–9 Hyanggyo-ro, Gyo-dong around 1795, when Hwaseong Fortress was built. The school houses memorial tablets to Confucius, Mencius, and 25 Korean figures noteworthy to Confucianism. It is open to the public on weekdays from 9 a.m. till 5 p.m., but it is closed at weekends.

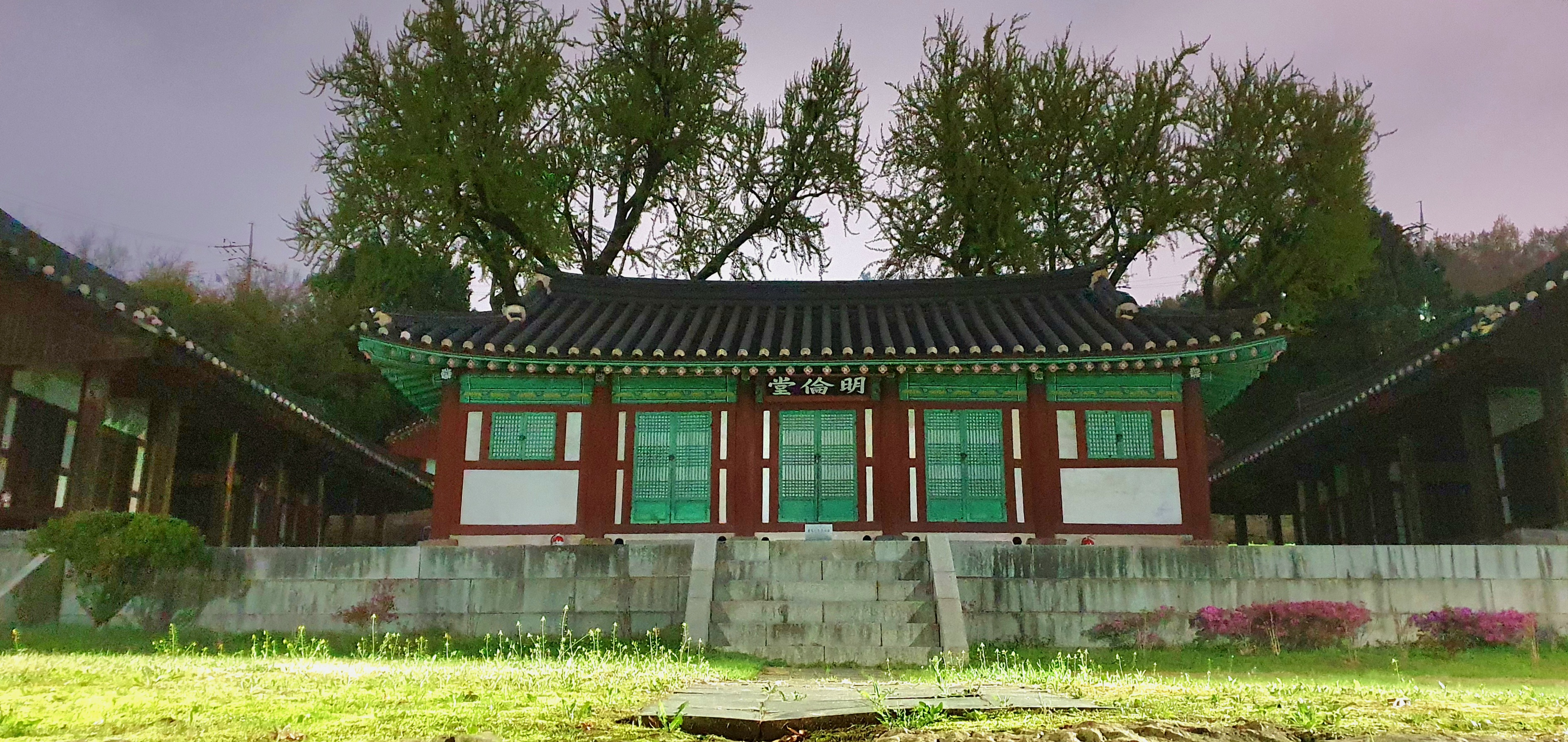
Myeongnyundang (front)

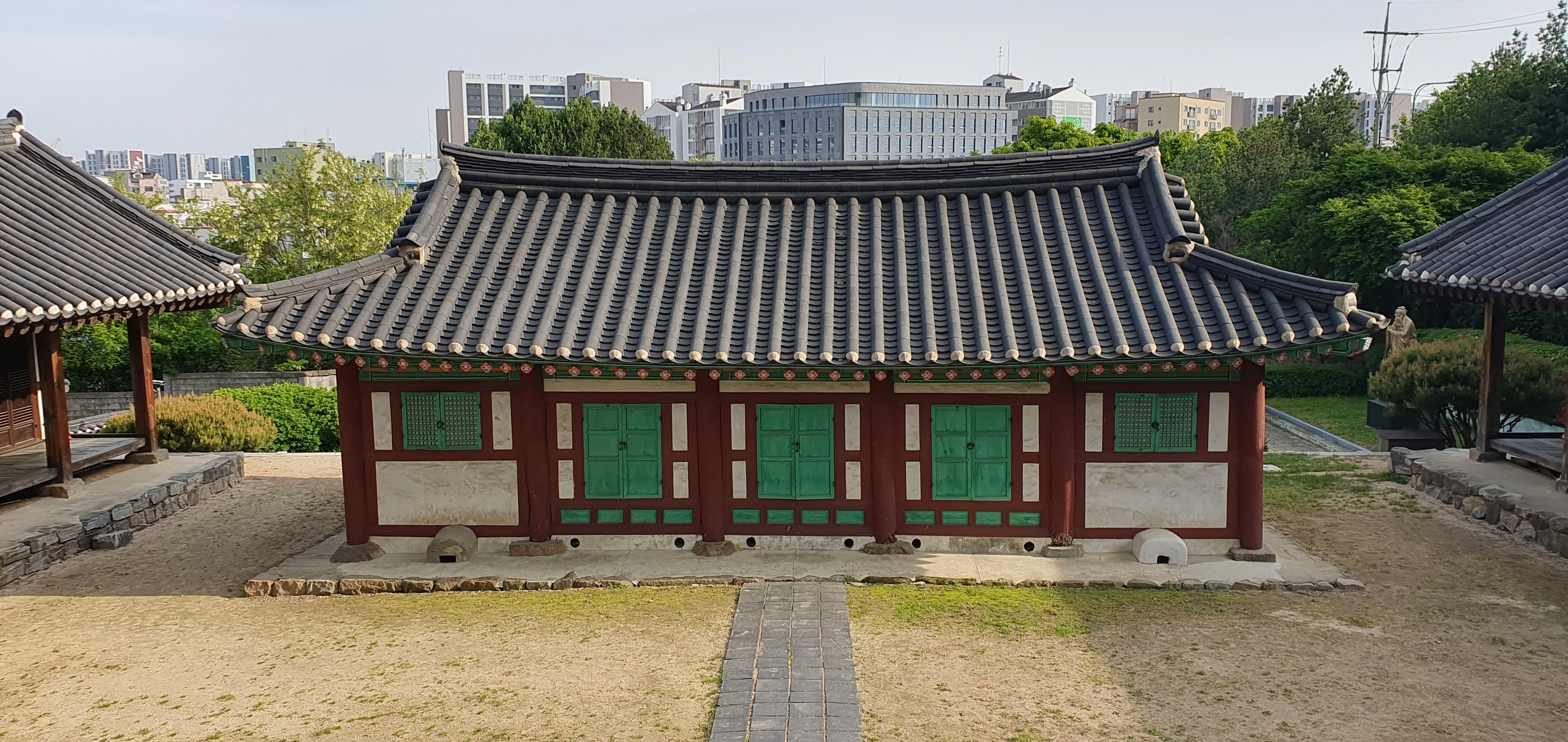
Myeongnyundang (rear)

=== Bugugwon ===
Bugugwon (부국원), built prior to 1923, is a cultural centre at 130 Hyanggyo-ro, Gyo-dong. There is no record of the 85.95 m^{2} building's construction, but exterior photographs were published in 1923. Under Japanese rule, the building was the headquarters of Bugugwon Co., Ltd., which sold agricultural products such as fertilizers. After liberation, from 1952 to 1956, it temporarily housed the Suwon Court and the Public Prosecutor's Office. From 1957 to 1960, it was used as the Suwon City Education Support Office, and in 1974 the Republican Party used it as their Gyeonggi Province base. In 1979, the Suwon Arts Foundation was based here, and in 1981 it became an internal medicine clinic. Since 2018, it has been a public cultural space.

=== Adams Memorial Hall ===
Adams Memorial Hall served as a focal point for the independence movement. The building was constructed in 1923 under Pastor William Noble with funding from various sources, including a church in the United States, Suwon Jongno Church, and residents. Here, independence activists including Park Seon-tae and Lee Deuk-su met weekly to discuss their activities.

== Culture and contemporary life ==
=== Housing ===
As is typical of urban South Korea, Suwon has many apartment complexes. The city has been affected greatly by real estate price fluctuations.

=== Food ===
Suwon is known for Suwon galbi, a variation on beef ribs enjoyed throughout Korea.

=== Sport ===
Suwon World Cup Stadium was built for the 2002 FIFA World Cup. Today, it is home to Suwon Samsung Bluewings, who compete in the top-tier K League 1. Their city rivals, Suwon FC, also field a men's team in K League 1, while Suwon FC Women play in the WK League. Both Suwon FC teams play their matches at Suwon Sports Complex.

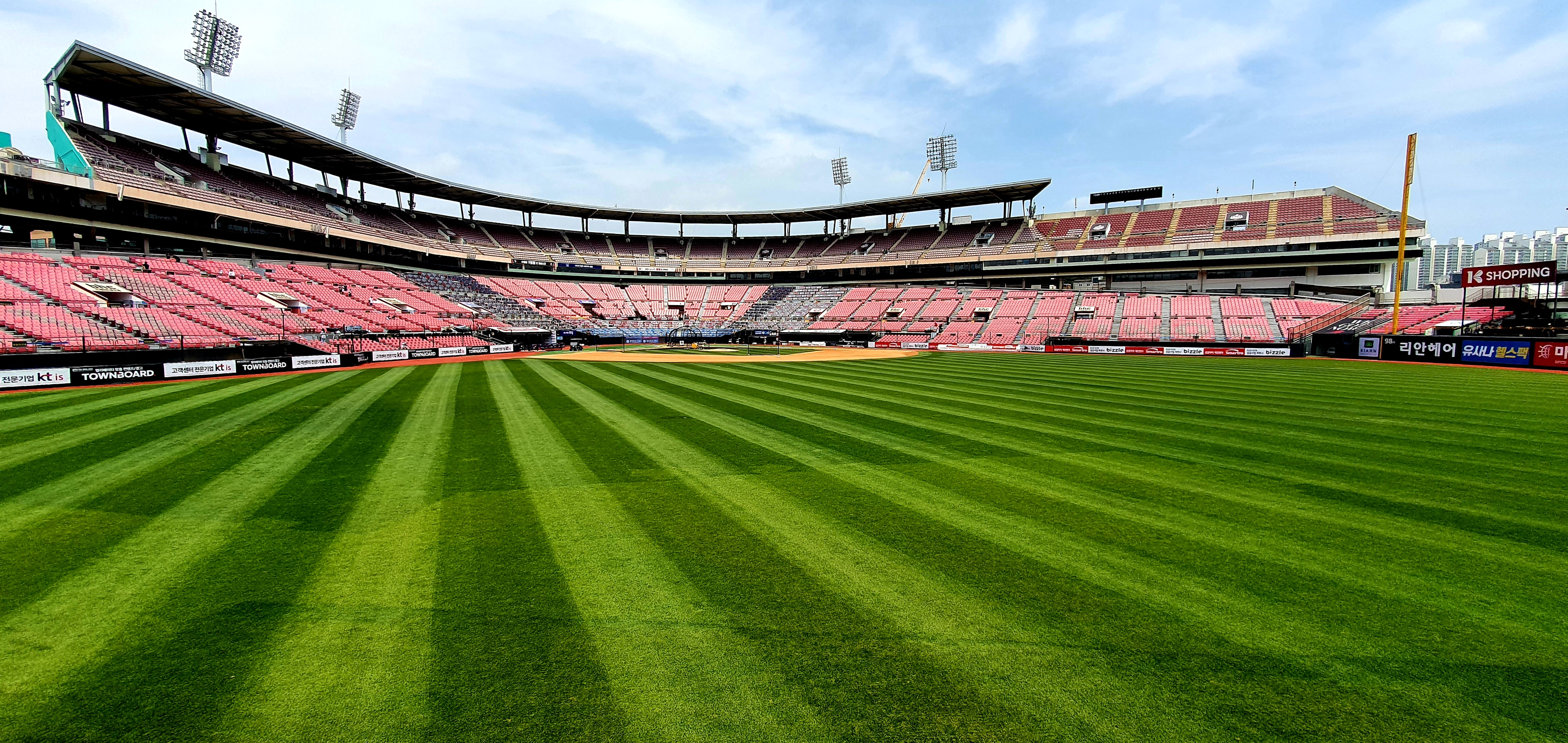
KT Wiz Stadium

Since 2013, Suwon has been home to the professional baseball team KT Wiz. The team played at Sungkyunkwan University until Suwon Baseball Stadium remodeling was completed in time for their elevation to the KBO League in 2015. The stadium was previously the home of the Hyundai Unicorns, who folded after the 2007 season.

Two of the Korean Basketball League and Women's Korean Basketball League's oldest teams, Samsung Thunders and Samsung Life Blueminx respectively, used to be based in Suwon. Samsung Thunders relocated to Jamsil Arena in Seoul in 2001 while Samsung Life moved to Yongin in 2005. Top-flight men's basketball returned to Suwon in 2021, when KT Sonicboom relocated from Busan to the renamed Suwon KT Sonicboom Arena (formerly Seosuwon Chilbo Gymnasium).

The 5,145-capacity Suwon Gymnasium is home to the men's and women's V-League volleyball teams Suwon KEPCO Vixtorm and Suwon Hyundai Engineering & Construction Hillstate respectively. This gymnasium staged the handball events in the 1988 Summer Olympics. It also hosted handball and table tennis at the 2014 Asian Games and hosted the 2010 Judo World Cup.

=== Museums ===
Suwon has two national museums. The National Map Museum of Korea houses a collection of 33,598 maps. This museum is located at 92 Worldcup-ro, Woncheon-dong. Admission is free, and the museum opens daily from 10 a.m. to 5 p.m. Suwon's other national museum, the National Agricultural Museum of Korea, opened by Seoho Lake in December 2022. This museum is located at 154 Suin-ro, Seodun-dong, admission is free, and it is open daily from 10 a.m. till 6 p.m.

There are also a number of smaller museums in Suwon. For example, Suwon Hwaseong Museum, at 21 Changnyong-daero, Maehyang-dong, features exhibits contextualizing and explaining the construction of Hwaseong. A smaller museum, which focuses on the history of toilets, Haewoojae, has gathered some international attention. Built privately in 2007 at 463 Jangan-ro, Imok-dong, this museum is dedicated to the history of toilets. Ownership of Haewoojae was transferred to the city council in 2009.

=== Libraries ===
Suwon Central Library opened in 1980 at 318 Paldalsan-ro, Gyo-dong. Today, the city has 27 public libraries: seven in Gwonseon District, five in Jangan District, six in Paldal District, and nine in Yeongtong District. The council also plans to build another in Imok-dong.

=== Parks and gardens ===
Suwon has two municipal arboreta: Irwol Arboretum (일월 수목원) and Yeongheung Arboretum (영흥 수목원). These opened simultaneously on 19 May 2023 beside Irwol Reservoir and Yeongheung Park respectively. The 10.15-hectare (25.1-acre) Irwol Arboretum features 429,000 plants of 52,000 species, while Yeongheung Arboretum hosts 118,000 plants of 42,000 species over 14.6 hectares (36 acres). There are also 338 parks scattered through the city. Some of these, e.g., Gwanggyo Lake Park, Seoho Park, Irwol Park, and Manseok Park, contain sizeable lakes.

=== Street art ===
Haenggung-dong and Ji-dong in central Suwon are known for their murals, while Haenggung-dong streets have a variety of other artistic features such as optical illusions.

=== Media ===
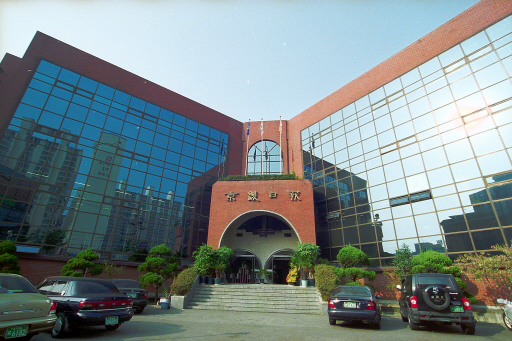
Kyeonggi Ilbo Headquarters

Newspapers based in Suwon include the Kyeonggi Ilbo (경기일보) in Jangan District, and the Kyeongin Ilbo (경인일보) and Suwon Daily (수원일보) in Paldal District.

National broadcaster KBS has a drama studio and art hall in Ingye-dong, Yeongtong District. These are open to visits by appointment.

=== Cinemas ===
Suwon has several multiplex cinemas: three branches of CGV (in Ha-dong, Ingye-dong, and Jowon-dong, Hwaseo-dong); four branches of Lotte Cinema (in Cheoncheon-dong, Geumgok-dong, Iui-dong, and Seodun-dong); and six branches of Megabox (in Gwonseon-dong, Haenggung-dong, Homaesil-dong, Ingye-dong, Jeongja-dong, and Maesan-dong). Other smaller cinemas, which may show fewer foreign films, include Cinema Town, Taehan Theater, Piccadilly Theater, Jungang Theater, Royal Theater, Dano Theater, and Dano Art Hall.

=== Retail ===
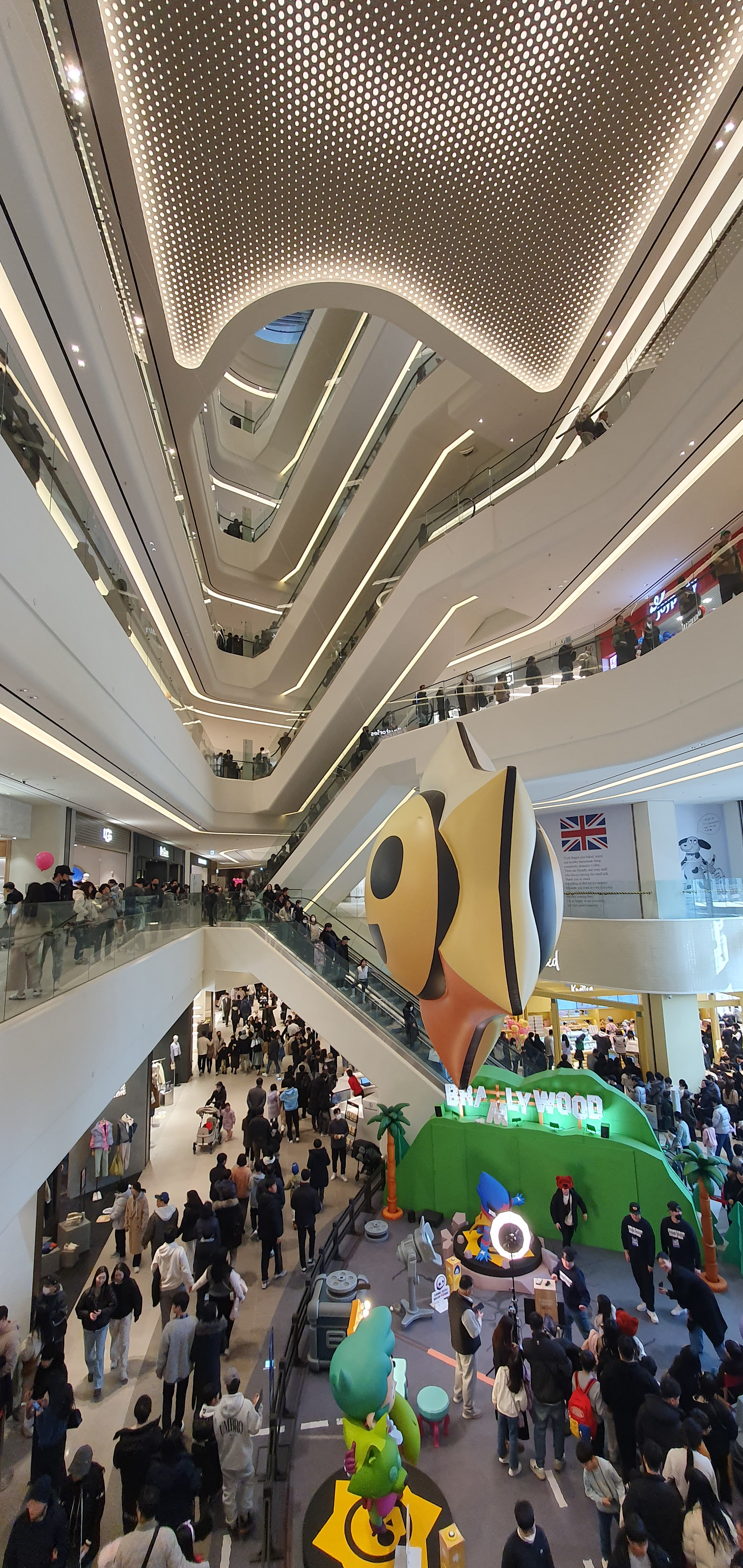
Starfield

There are several major shopping centres across Suwon, e.g., AK Plaza and Lotte Mall at Suwon Station, and Avenue France and Alleyway in Gwanggyo. Another large centre, Starfield—incorporating its own library and a Megabox cinema—opened beside Hwaseo Station in January 2024. This mall targets a younger customer base, and incorporates pop-up stores. The first pop-up for the popular game 'Brawl Stars' was held here. The warehouse-style discount store 'Traders' is located in the basement.

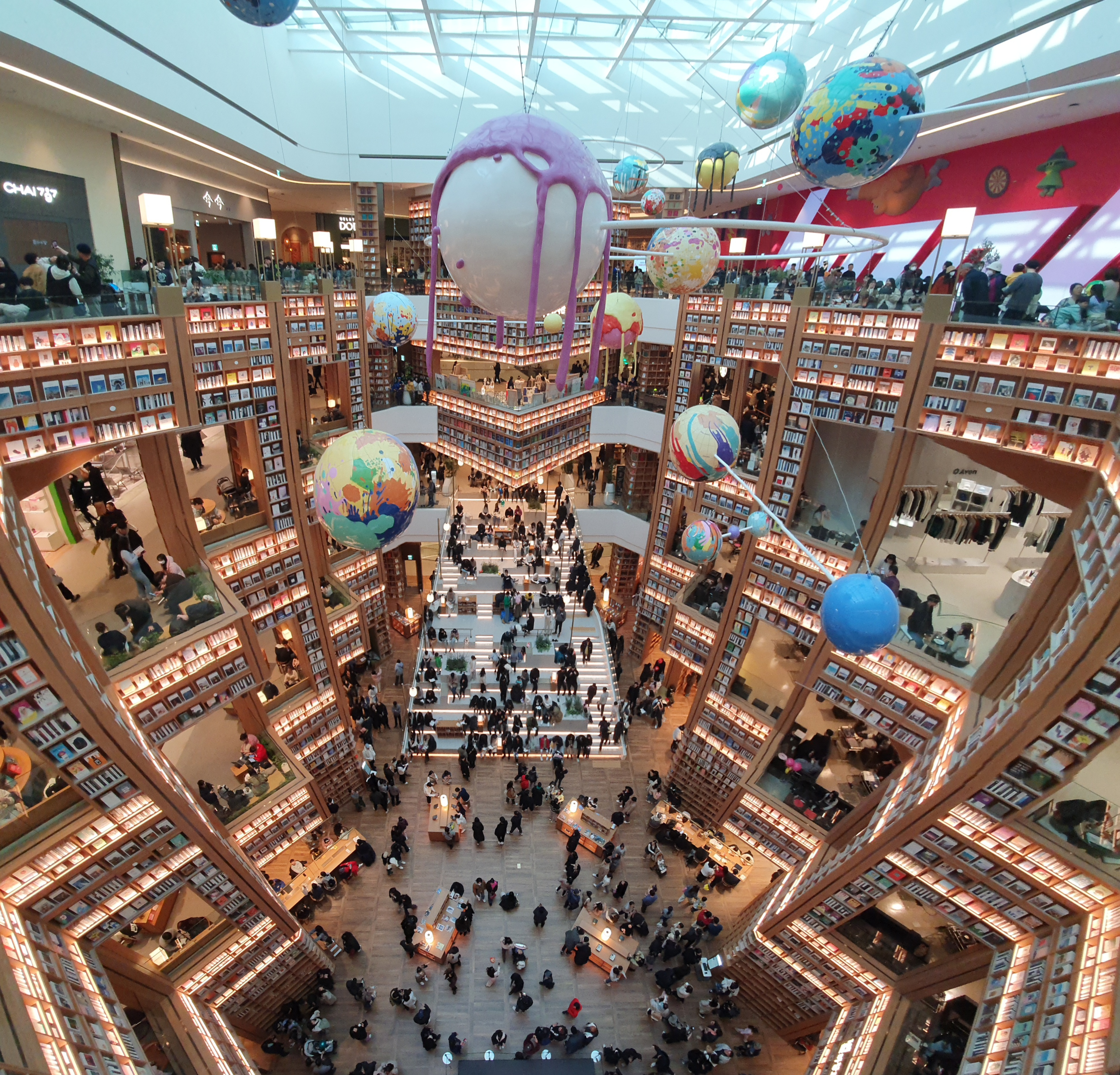
Library in Starfield

=== Public toilets ===
In the early 2000s, Suwon City Council strove to improve the condition of its public lavatories, and afterwards ran guided tours of the municipal facilities. Suwon has hosted several international conferences on toilet management, and the World Toilet Association is based in the city.

== Transport ==
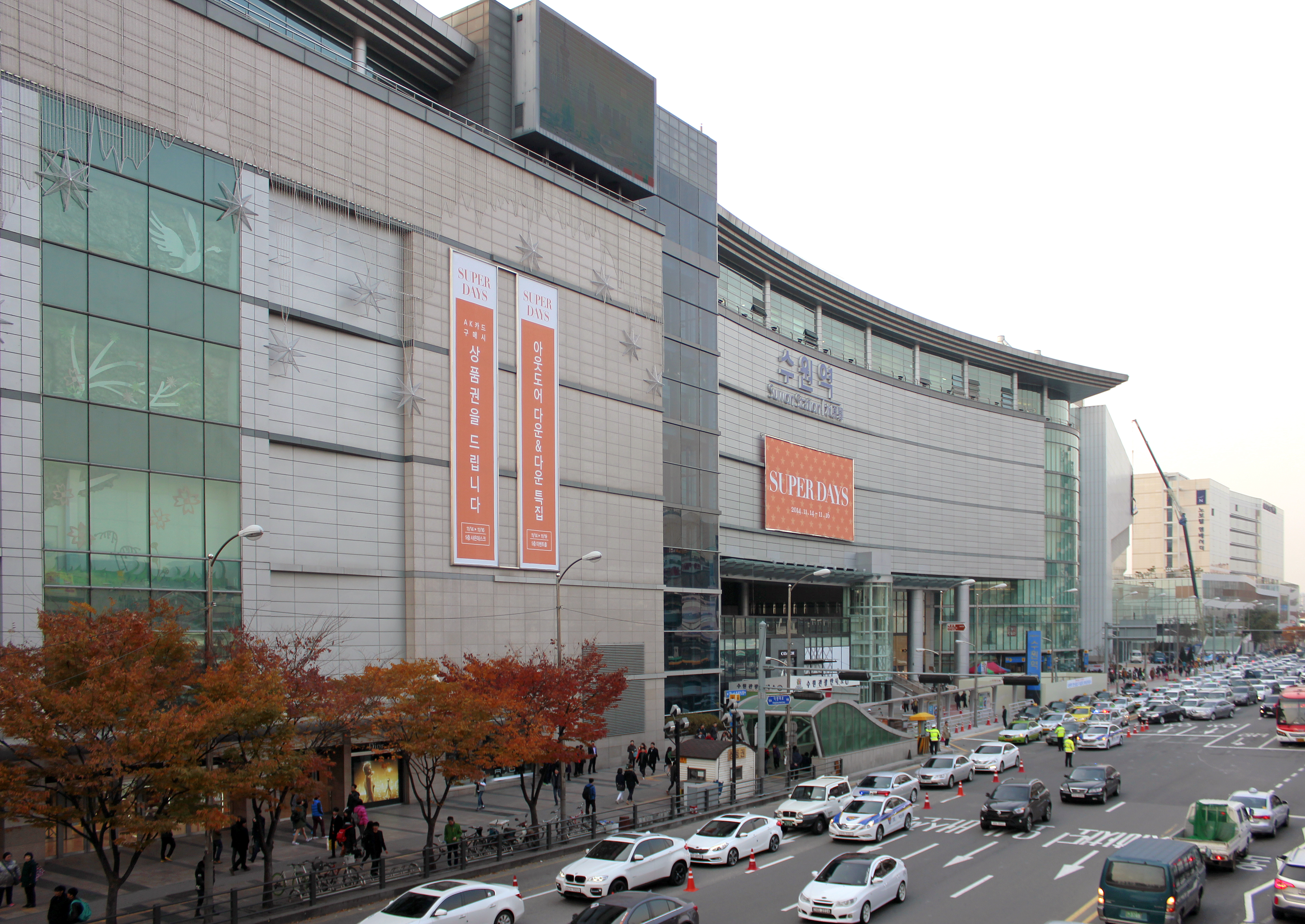
Suwon Station

Suwon Station is served by KTX and other trains on the Gyeongbu Line, which connects Seoul to Busan. From 1930 to 1972, the Suryeo Line also connected Suwon to Yeoju, and from 1937 to 1996, the Suin Line ran from Suwon to Incheon. The Suin Line has since been reconstructed as part of the Seoul Metro. Today, three Seoul Metro lines (14 stations) serve Suwon, and there are plans for network expansion. Construction of an extension of the Sinbundang Line to Homaesil is scheduled to begin in 2024. Another planned line—the Dongtan–Indeogwon Line—should create several new stations in Suwon, but this has been delayed, prompting affected cities to call for urgent action.

Suwon metro stations
Line	Station
Line 1	Sungkyunkwan University (성균관대)
Line 1	Hwaseo (화서)
Line 1	Suwon (수원)
Line 1	Seryu (세류)
Shinbundang Line	Gwanggyo Jungang (광교중앙)
Shinbundang Line	Gwanggyo (광교)
Suin-Bundang Line	Cheongmyeong (청명)
Suin-Bundang Line	Yeongtong (영통)
Suin-Bundang Line	Mangpo (망포)
Suin-Bundang Line	Maetan-Gwonseon (매탄권성)
Suin-Bundang Line	Suwon Hall (수원시청)
Suin-Bundang Line	Maegyo (매교)
Suin-Bundang Line	Suwon (수원)
Suin-Bundang Line	Gosaek (고색)
Suin-Bundang Line	Omokcheon (오목천)

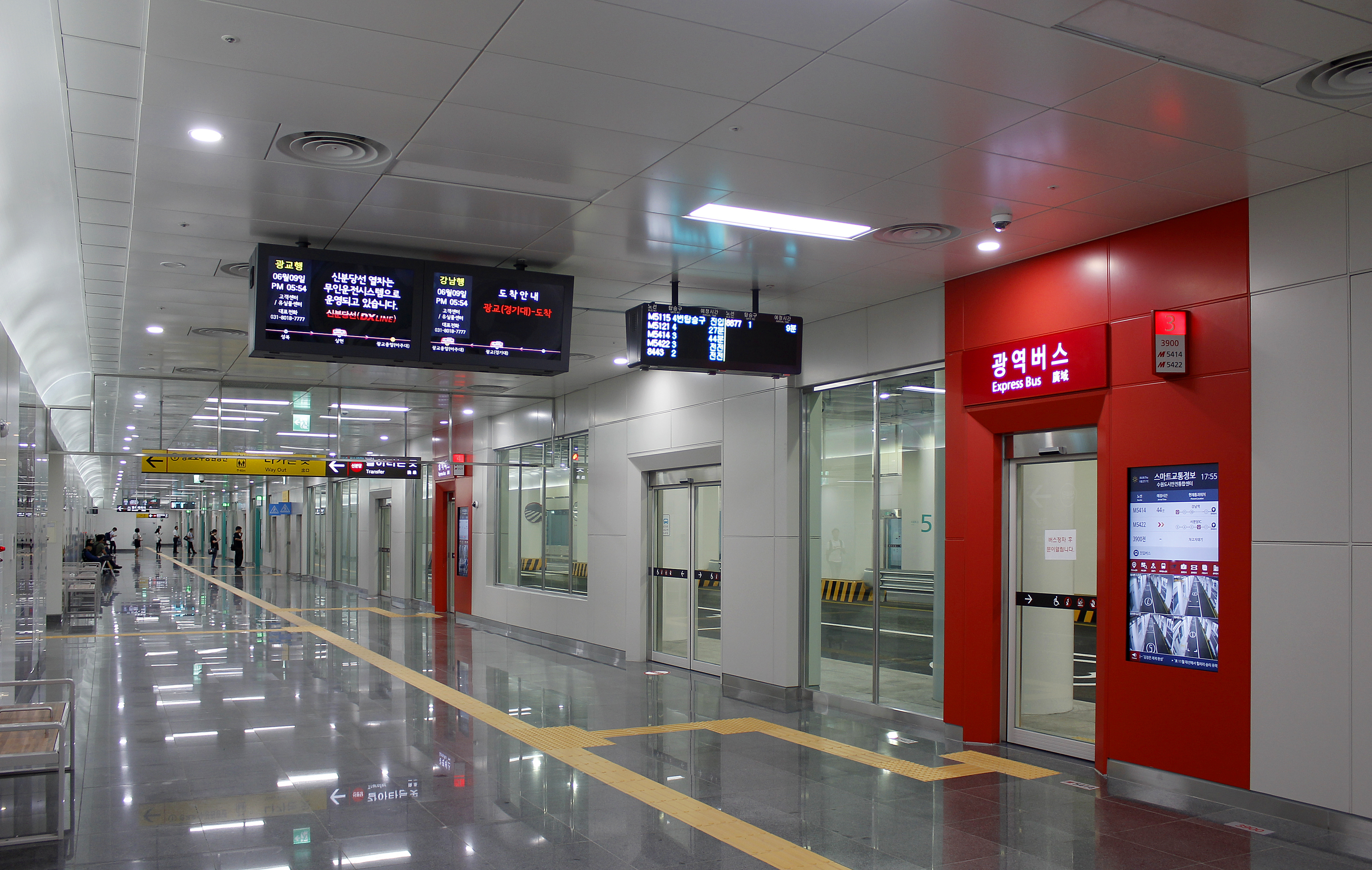
Gwanggyo Jungang Underground Transfer Centre

Suwon is also served by two inter-city bus terminals with nationwide connections: Suwon Bus Terminal near Seryu Station, and West Suwon Bus Terminal in Guun-dong. Nevertheless, bus terminal passenger numbers are decreasing. Suwon is also connected to Seoul and other nearby cities by city and express buses with departure points across the city. In 2017, a new bank of bus stops opened at Suwon Station Transfer Center. This was built to alleviate pressure on existing bus and taxi stands across the tracks. Another transfer centre is incorporated into Gwanggyo Jungang Station; this is underground, and bus stands feature screen doors. Suwon has invested heavily in electric buses—in 2019, it built the country's largest bus charging station at 46 Gyeongsu-daero 1220beon-gil, Pajang-dong.

Suwon is served by several expressways. The Yeongdong Expressway (50) passes through the city, with two exits within the city limits: North Suwon and East Suwon. The Gwanggyo Sanghyeon exit on the Yongin–Seoul Expressway (171) is on Suwon's border with Yongin, and the Pyeongtaek–Paju Expressway (17) also has an exit in Suwon (Geumgok). The Suwon exit of the Gyeongbu Expressway (1) was renamed Suwon Singal in 2014 to reflect its actual location in Singal in neighboring Yongin.

Suwon has invested in ecological transport. The city was the first place in Korea to introduce dockless public bicycles. Traversing Suwon by bicycle is facilitated by numerous cycle paths beside the streams that cut through the city. In 2013, Suwon hosted the EcoMobility World Festival. For one month, streets in Haenggung-dong were closed to cars as a car-free experiment. Residents used non-motorized vehicles provided by the festival organizers. The experiment was not unopposed.

== Military ==
Suwon Air Base in Jangji-dong, Gwonseon District was used by the United States Air Force during the Korean War, when it was the scene of the conflict's first aerial combat. Today the base is under Republic of Korea Air Force jurisdiction, though it is still managed and maintained by the US military. The US military also maintains Madison Site—a small signals unit with nearby helipad on Gwanggyosan.

== Fauna ==
While much of Suwon's wildlife can be expected to be similar to that in the surrounding province, two species are worth noting specifically in regard to the city. Firstly, an undisclosed location in Suwon appears to be Korea's first recorded breeding site of the white-breasted waterhen. Secondly, the Suwon tree frog—one of three tree frogs to inhabit the Korean peninsula— was discovered in Suwon around 1980, but due to urban sprawl it is no longer found in the city. It has, however, been found recently in Paju, Ansan, and Pyeongtaek (Gyeonggi Province); Eumseong (Chungcheongbuk-do); Gangwon-do; and North Korea. The species is considered endangered.

== Notable people ==
=== Historical figures ===
- Suwon was the birthplace of Choi Ru-baek (?–1205), famed for his filial piety, and of his noble wife Yŏm Kyŏng-ae (염경애; 廉瓊愛, 1100–1146).
- Suwon was the home of Yi Ko (1341–1420), a Goryeo subject opposed to Joseon.
- The eminent Silhak scholar and agricultural pioneer Woo Ha-yŏng (1741–1812) was born in Suwon.
- Kim Sehwan (1889–1945), independence activist during the Japanese colonial period
- Kim Hyanghwa (1897–?), independence activist during the Japanese colonial period
- Na Hye-sok (1896–1948), influential feminist, painter, writer, poet, sculptor, and journalist

=== Sports players ===
- Chung Hyeon, tennis
- Dong Hyun Kim, MMA
- Oh Kyo-moon, archery
- Park Ji-sung, football. Park was born in Seoul but raised in Suwon, and in 2005, a city street was renamed after him.

=== Entertainers ===
- Han-na Chang, conductor, cellist
- Im Chang-kyun, stage name I.M
- Jeon Ji-yoon
- Jo Kwon
- Kim Myung-jun, stage name MJ
- Kim Yu-gwon, stage name U-Kwon
- Lee Chang-sub
- Lee Ju-eun
- Shin Dong-hee, stage name Shindong
- Yoo Jeong-yeon
- Yoo Ji-min, stage name Karina
- Yoon Bo-mi
- Lee Jong-suk
- Park Hae-soo
- Ryu Jun-yeol
- Song Kang

=== Other ===
- Pastor Kim Jang Hwan (known as Billy Kim) — former president of the Baptist World Alliance, and president of the Far East Broadcasting Company
- Sam Oh — presenter and columnist

== Sister cities ==
Suwon is twinned internationally with:

- Asahikawa, Japan (1989)
- Jinan, China (1993)
- Townsville, Australia (1997)
- Bandung, Indonesia (1997)
- Yalova, Turkey (1999)
- Cluj-Napoca, Romania (1999)
- Toluca, Mexico (1999)
- Fez, Morocco (2003)
- Hải Dương Province, Vietnam (2004),
- Siem Reap Province, Cambodia (2004)
- Nizhny Novgorod, Russia (2005)
- Curitiba, Brazil (2006) and
- Freiburg im Breisgau, Germany (2015)
- Phoenix, United States (2021)
- Toury, France (2023)
- Mississauga, Canada (2023)

Suwon also twinned intranationally with Jeju (1997), Pohang (2009), Jeonju (2016), and Nonsan (2021).

== See also ==
- List of cities in South Korea
- Geography of South Korea
- Seoul National Capital Area
