= Manseok Park =

Park in Suwon, South Korea

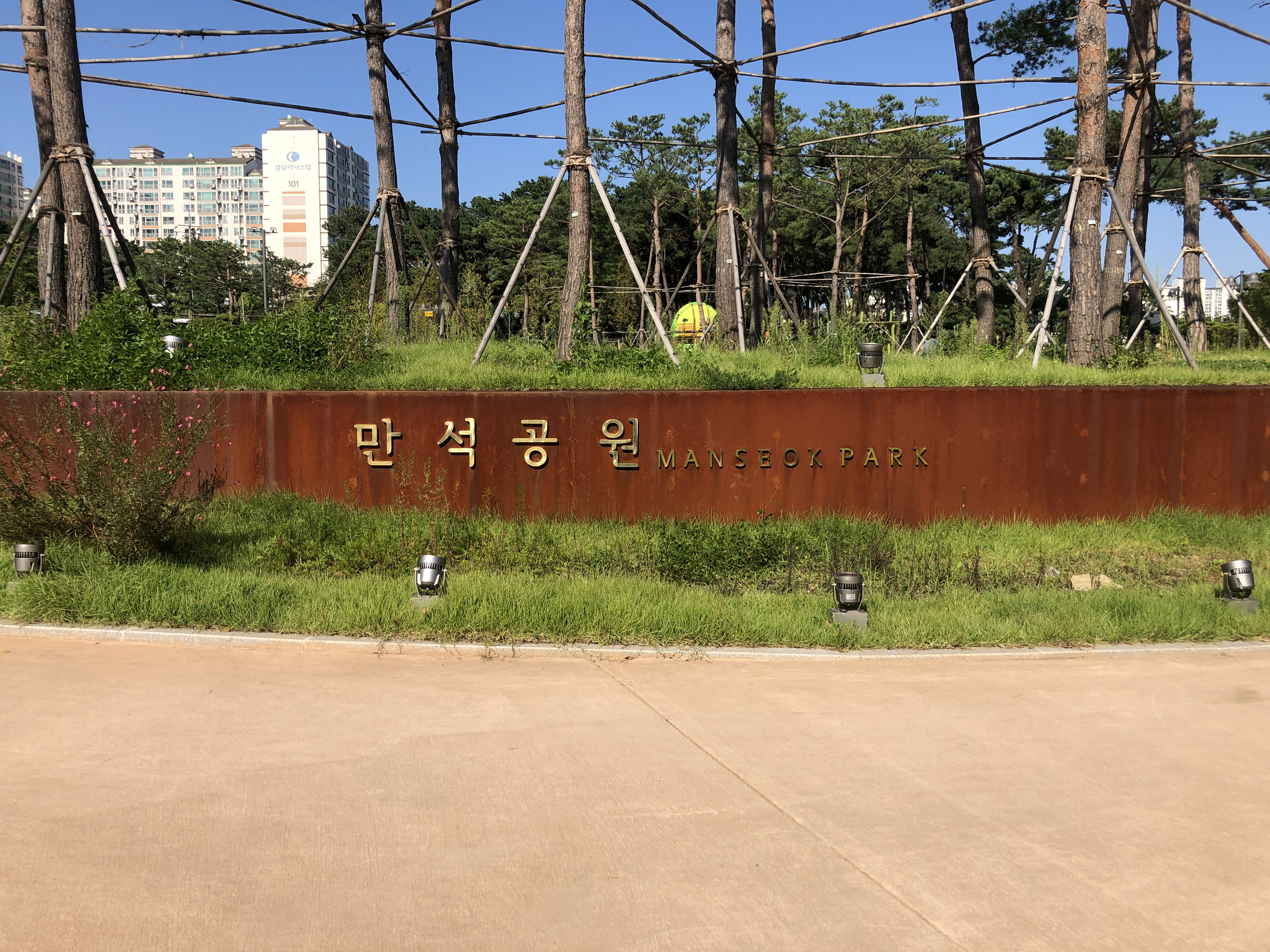
- Interactive map of Manseok Park
- Coordinates: 37°18′N 127°00′E

Korean name
- Hangul: 만석공원
- Hanja: 萬石公園
- RR: Manseok gongwon
- MR: Mansŏk kongwŏn

Manseok Park (Korean: 만석공원) is a large public park in the Jeongja-dong area of Jangan-gu, Suwon, Gyeonggi Province, South Korea.

== Facilities ==
The centrepiece of the park is a man-made reservoir around which there is a 1200 m track used for walking, running, rollerblading and cycling. There is a huge paved area and permanent stage on the east side of the park, which hosts various outdoor events and celebrations every year, while the Suwon Arts Centre can be found on the south side. The park is also home to the 14 tennis-courts (Manseok tennis-court/Hard court) of the North Suwon Tennis Club. The specialized tennis shop is on the first floor across from the tennis court. There is a full size dirt soccer pitch on the west side and a high quality astroturf soccer pitch on the east side of the park.

In 2004 the Suwon X-games skatepark opened at Manseok. This public facility has two half pipes (one being the highest public half-pipe in Korea) and a large selection of top-quality ramps, rails and boxes. There is an oval speed track around the perimeter of the park for rollerbladers.

The park also features high quality restrooms in accordance with Suwon City Council's stated policy.

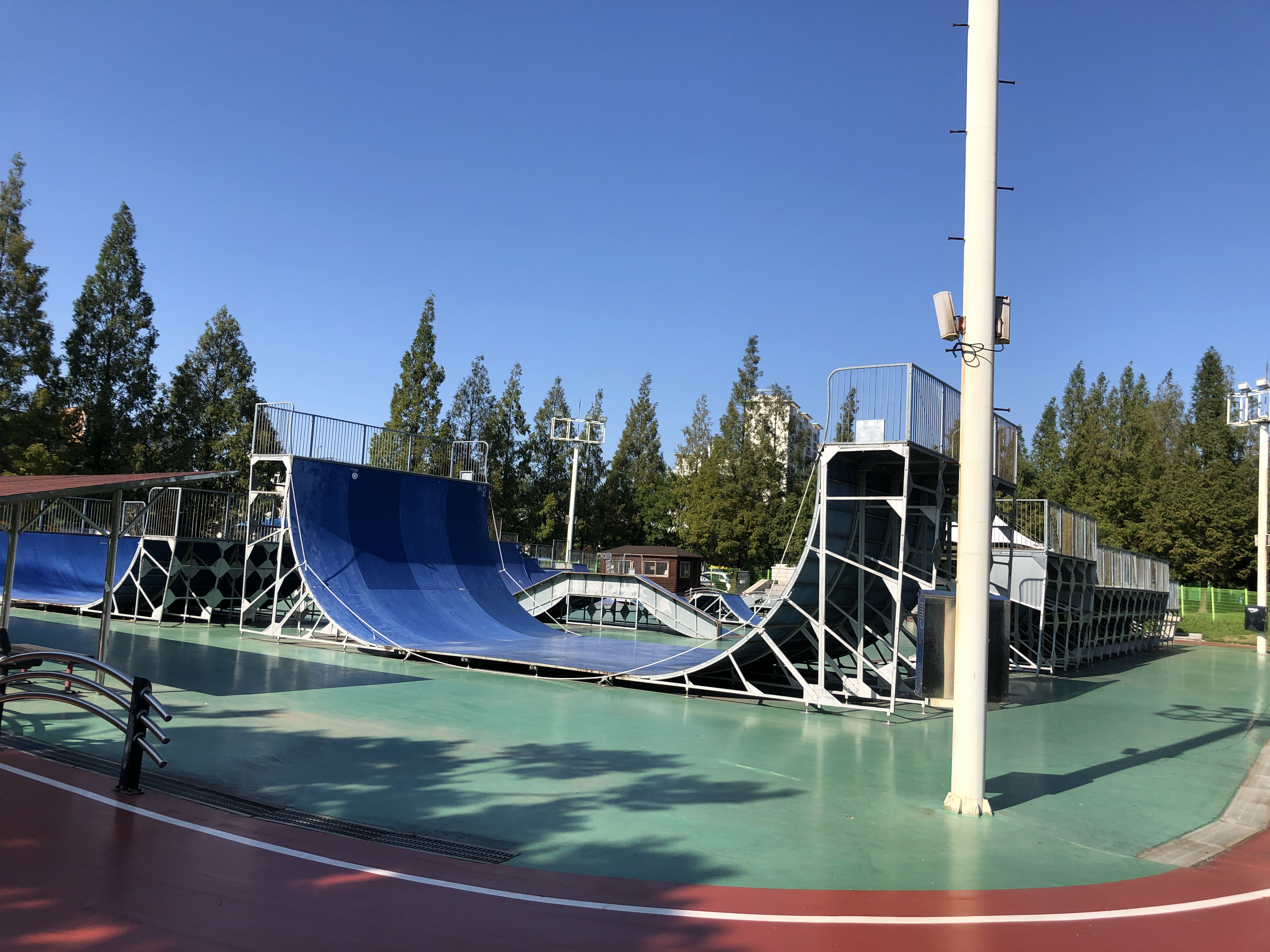
Half-pipes

== Events ==
Each June the park hosts the Suwon Galbi Festival, a highlight of the Korean gastronomic calendar. Galbi (marinated, barbecued beef ribs) originates from Suwon and is served all over Korea and around the world. The event consists of a massive number of pojangmacha (Hangeul: 포장마차) being erected and cooking up as much galbi as possible, accompanied by plenty of soju.

During the 2002 FIFA World Cup, Manseok became the Suwon World Cup Park and large screens and stages were erected to celebrate the country's co-hosting of the event. Tens of thousands of fans from Korea and around the world witnessed the performances of the South Korean team on the big screens.

== Food and drink ==
The park has a variety of restaurants and bars along the street to the north-east. There is a wide range of Korean food, including galmaegisal (갈매기살) and stewed chicken (닭백숙), and Datzzang Donkas recently opened its first branch outside Seoul here. There is a range of Korean-style bars, and also It Bar, a western-style alternative.

== Transport ==
Most buses which serve north Suwon and many express buses between Suwon and Seoul stop just outside the park, including the frequent 65 (Anyang–Woncheon Resort) and the 7770 (Suwon–Sadang (Seoul) express). The nearest subway stop is Hwaseo on Line 1. The park is also close to the Suwon kt Wiz park baseball stadium and the Suwon FC football stadium.

== See also ==
- Parks in South Korea
