= Suwon Central Baptist Church =

- Location: Suwon
- Country: South Korea
- Denomination: Baptist
- Website: central.or.kr

History
- Founded: 1951

Suwon Central Baptist Church is an Evangelical Christian Baptist megachurch located in Suwon, South Korea, affiliated with the Korea Baptist Convention. At present, the senior pastor is Myung Jin Ko.

== History ==
The church was founded in 1951. In 1960, Billy Kim became the senior pastor of the church which counts 10 people. In 1973, the church has 300 people. In 2005, when he retired, the church had 15,000 people. Myung Jin Ko becomes the Senior Pastor in January 2005. In 2008, the church has 20,000 people. In May 2025, the church will inaugurate a new six-story building with a 2,200-seat auditorium and a cafe. In 2025, it would have 30,000 people.

== See also ==
- List of the largest evangelical churches
- List of the largest evangelical church auditoriums
