= Billy Kim =

South Korean pastor (born 1934)

Personal details
- Born: Billy Jang Hwan Kim; July 25, 1934 (age 92) Suwon, South Korea
- Denomination: Baptist
- Spouse: Trudy
- Children: 3
- Occupation: Former President of Baptist World Alliance and Far East Broadcasting Company Korea
- Education: Bob Jones University

Billy (Jang Hwan) Kim (Korean: 김장환; born July 25, 1934) is a prominent Christian evangelist and humanitarian. He was the president of the Baptist World Alliance from 2000 until 2005 when he was succeeded by David Coffey.

== Early life ==
Billy Kim was born in Suwon, Korea on July 25, 1934 into a poor farming family with three older brothers and an older sister. When the Korean War broke out in June 1950, the Kim family could not escape and stayed in Suwon. Billy worked as a houseboy for the U. S. military under Sgt. Carl Powers, who helped him go to America to get an education. He left Korea on November 12, 1951. Carl Powers enrolled Billy at Bob Jones University in Greenville, South Carolina where Billy converted to Christianity. Early on in his college career, Kim won a South Carolina speech contest with a speech entitled "I Speak for Democracy". He began preaching at small country churches on weekends. He earned a Bachelor of Arts in Biblical Studies in 1956.

In August 1958, Billy married Gertrude "Trudy" Stephens whom he met at Bob Jones University.

In February 1959, Billy was ordained at Dante Baptist Church, and in November of that year received his master's degree.

== Career ==
Billy Kim first began to work with Suwon Central Baptist Church on January 1, 1960, when it had only 10 members. In 2005, the congregation has grown to over 15,000, including 100 members in an English speaking congregation founded by Billy and his wife Trudy. He retired from the post of senior pastor on December 19, 2004 and was succeeded by Rev. Myung Jin Ko, formerly senior pastor of Osan Baptist Church, on January 2, 2005.

Billy is the Chairman of the Far East Broadcasting Company in Korea.

== Ministry ==
=== The Days of Ministry ===
When Billy returned to Korea in 1959, he and Trudy began their ministry in Suwon.

Billy Kim translated for Rev. Billy Graham during the 1973 Crusade.

=== Borderless Ministry ===
In 2000, Kim became the first Asian to be elected as President of the Baptist World Alliance.

== Family ==
Billy Kim and his wife Trudy have three children: Joseph Carl, Mary Kay, and John William. They have ten grandchildren.
