= Gwanggyo Lake Park =

Park in Suwon, South Korea

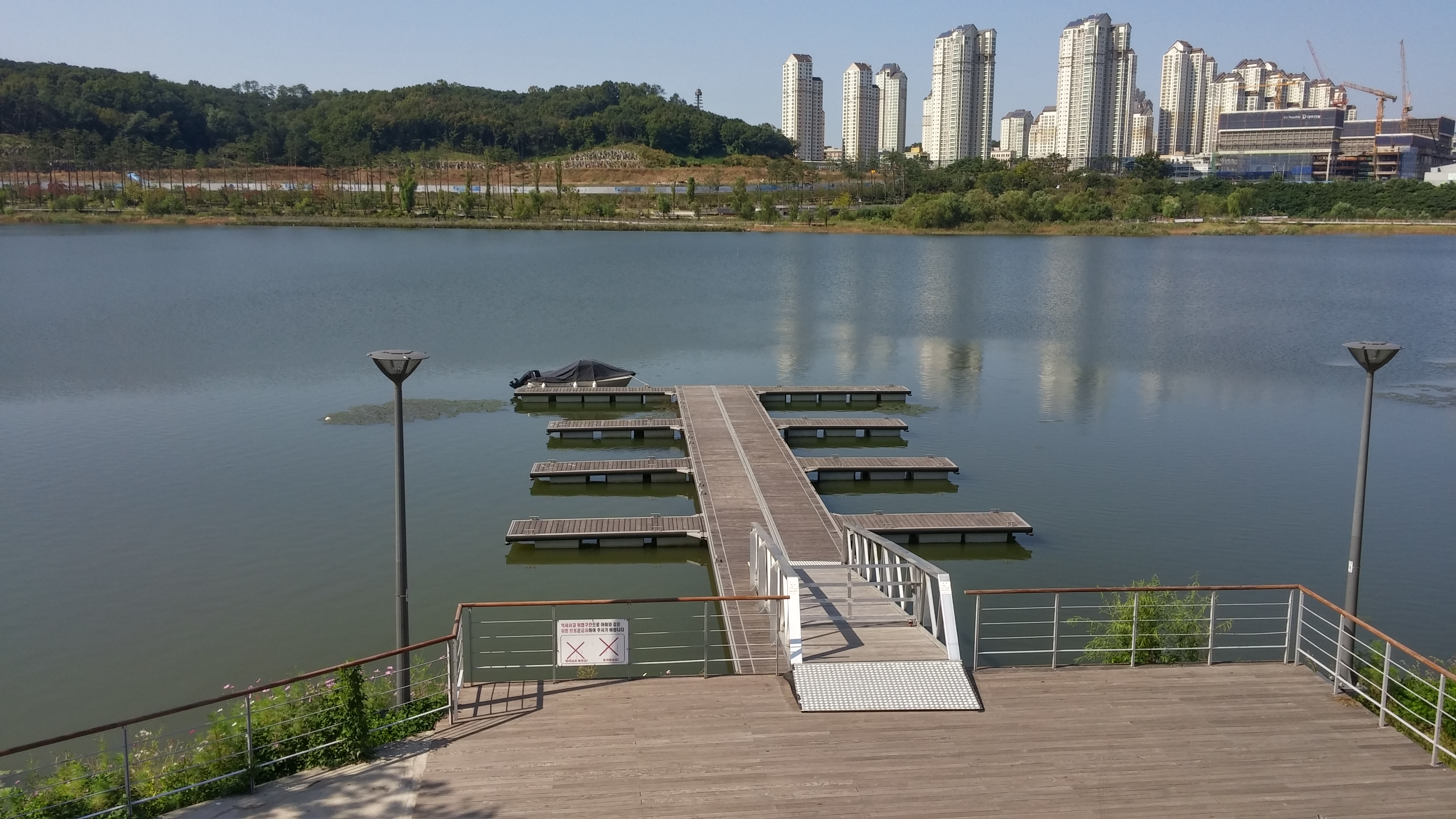
- Interactive map of Gwanggyo Lake Park
- Location: Ha-dong, Yeongtong-gu, Suwon, South Korea
- Coordinates: 37°16′59″N 127°03′57″E
- Visitors: 3 million (in every year)
- Website: www.gglakepark.or.kr

Korean name
- Hangul: 광교호수공원
- Hanja: 光敎湖水公園
- RR: Gwanggyo hosu gongwon
- MR: Kwanggyo hosu kongwŏn

Gwanggyo Lake Park (Korean: 광교호수공원) is a park in Ha-dong, Yeongtong-gu, Suwon, South Korea, with 3 million visitors each year.

Gwanggyo Lake Park located in Yeongtong - gu, Suwon - si, Gyeonggi Do.

It is one of Suwon's tourist attractions.

In 2014, it was selected as the Landscape Grand Prize by the Ministry of Land, Infrastructure and Transport.

Gwanggyo Lake park was newly built in 2013, after the creation of Gwanggyo new town. The period of construction was from June 2010 to April 2013, It took about 3 years to complete.

It is divided into Wonchon Lake and Sindae Lake and there are major facilities such as 'Urban Levee', 'Mysterious Water lily' and 'freiburg observatory'.

Urban Levy refers to the entire deck around the lake, and it is illuminated at night.

Mysterious Water lily is a water play space. There are various water facilities such as a wall fountain, a floor fountain, and a water plaza.

In Freiburg, you can see the scenery of both the Sindae Lake and the Wonchon Lake. The height is 33m.

In addition, there are cultural facilities such as a family camping ground, a climbing ground, a dog playground, and an outdoor performance hall.

At the time, construction was underway under the name of Amuse Park, but later it became known as Gwanggyo Lake Park, which was easy to call by the media, and at some point, that became the official name. Residents who have lived in the area for a long time sometimes call it Yuwonji, after the name of the former Woncheon Yuwon.
