= Mireukdang =

Shrine in Suwon, South Korea

Mireukdang Shrine
- 미륵당 (Korean)
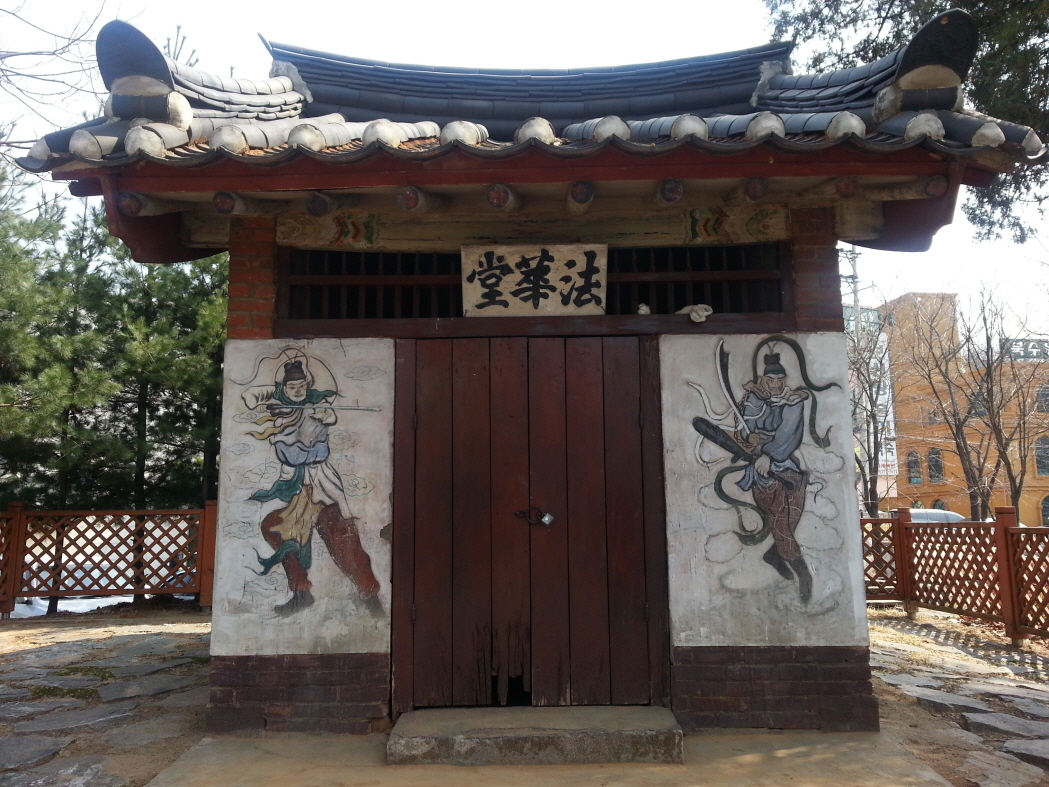
- Mireukdang Shrine

- Location within South Korea
- 37°19′17″N 126°59′22″E
- Location: Gyeonsu-daero 1220beongil, Pajang-dong, Jangan-gu, Suwon, Gyeonggi Province, South Korea

History
- Built: 1959

- Mireukdang
- Hangul: 미륵당
- Hanja: 彌勒堂
- RR: Mireukdang
- MR: Mirŭktang

Mireukdang (Korean: 미륵당; Hanja: 彌勒堂), also known as Beophwadang, built in 1959, is a shrine dedicated to Maitreya in Pajang-dong, Jangan-gu, Suwon, Gyeonggi Province, South Korea. It was designated as Local Cultural Heritage No. 5 by Suwon City Council on April 8, 1986.

== Overview ==
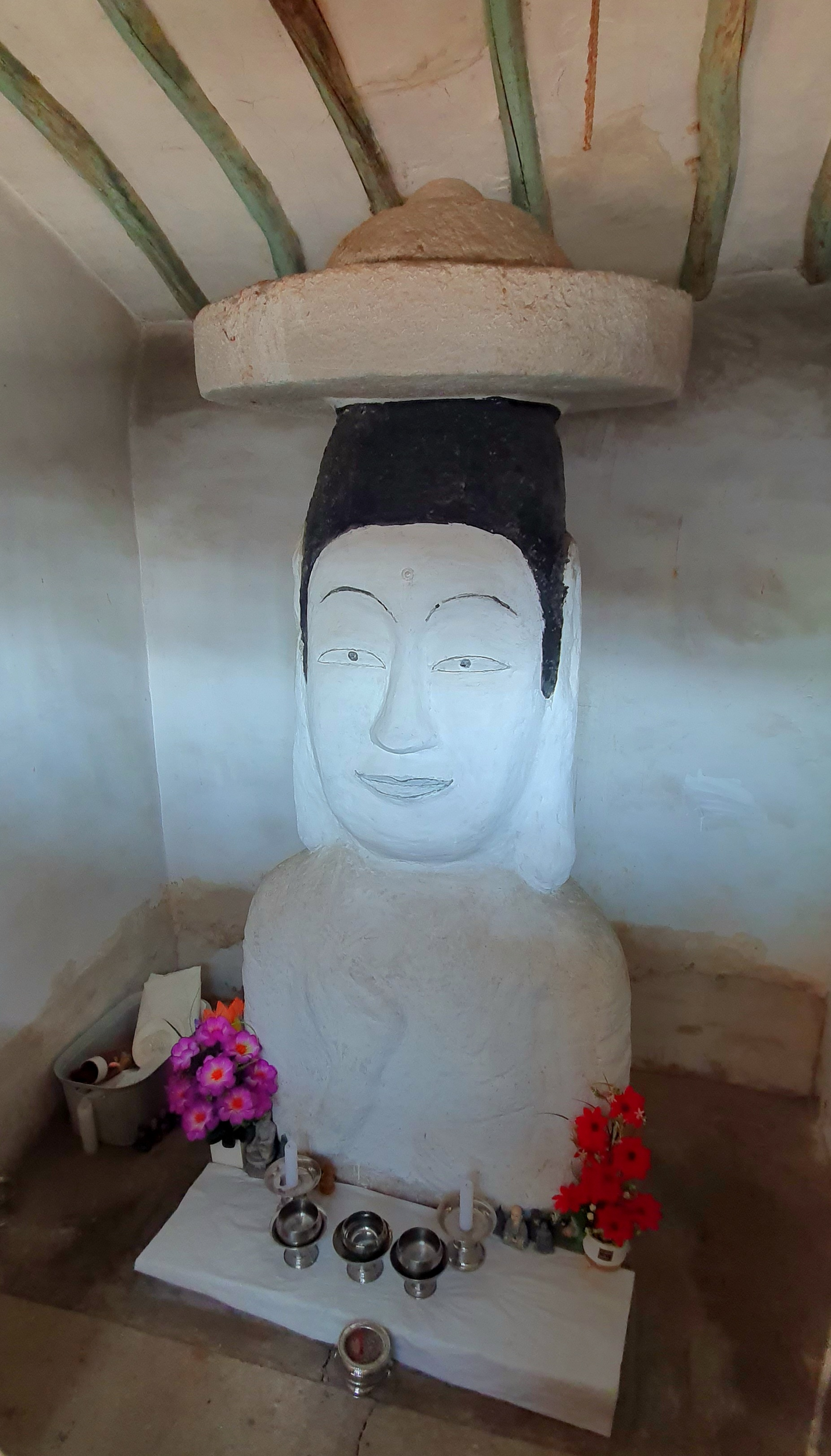
Mireukdang Statue

The small brick building, 3.1m in height, was built to house a statue of Maitreya, who was believed to protect the village where it stands. Only the upper half of the granite statue is exposed, with the lower half below ground. The upper body alone is about 2.44m in height, the chest is about 1.07m wide, and the head measures about 1.14 cm in height. The statue is believed to represent a Maitreya combined with folk beliefs since the mid-Joseon Dynasty due to its sculpting technique. The statue is made from a single granite rock, and features an oval pedestal.
