= Bundang District =

District of Seongnam, South Korea

Coordinates: 37.382782°N 127.118905°E

Bundang
- Non-autonomous District
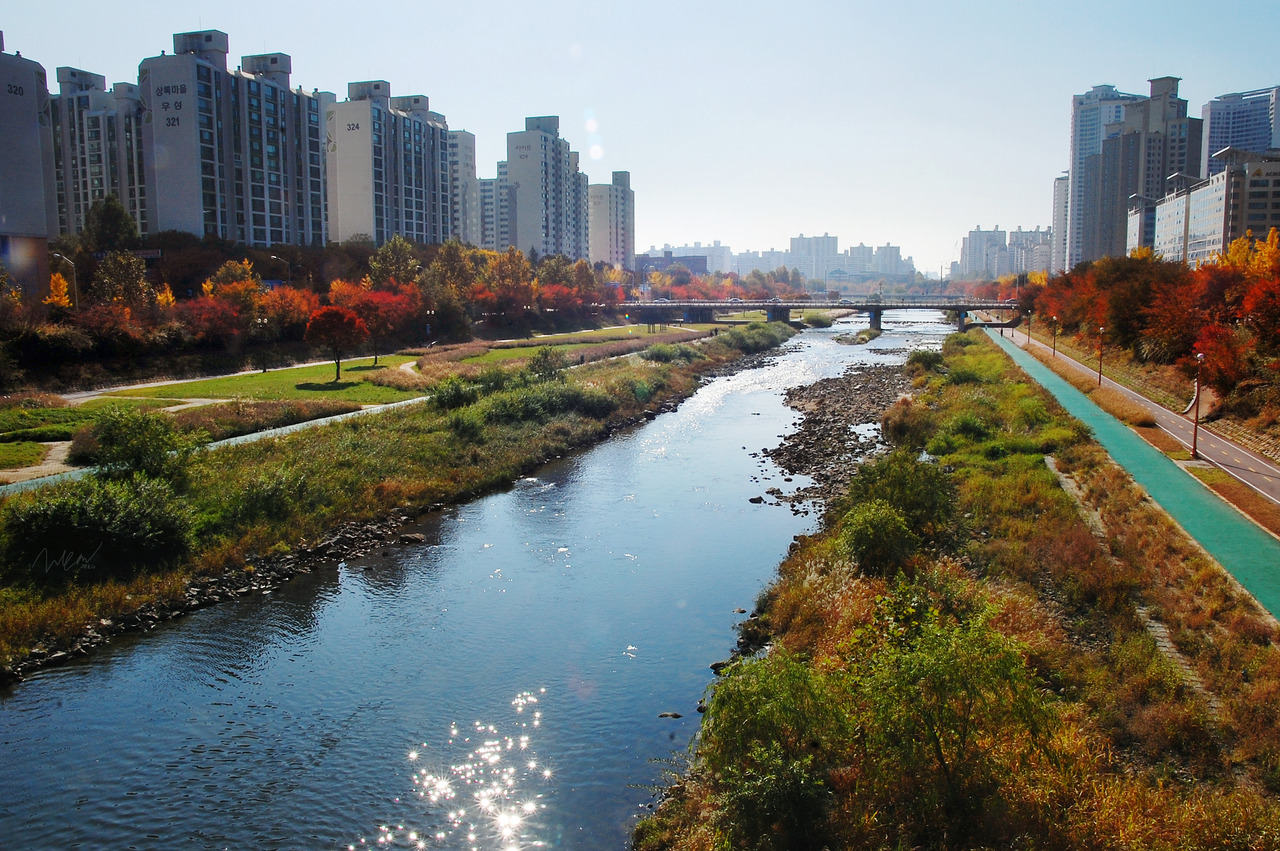
- Tancheon Stream

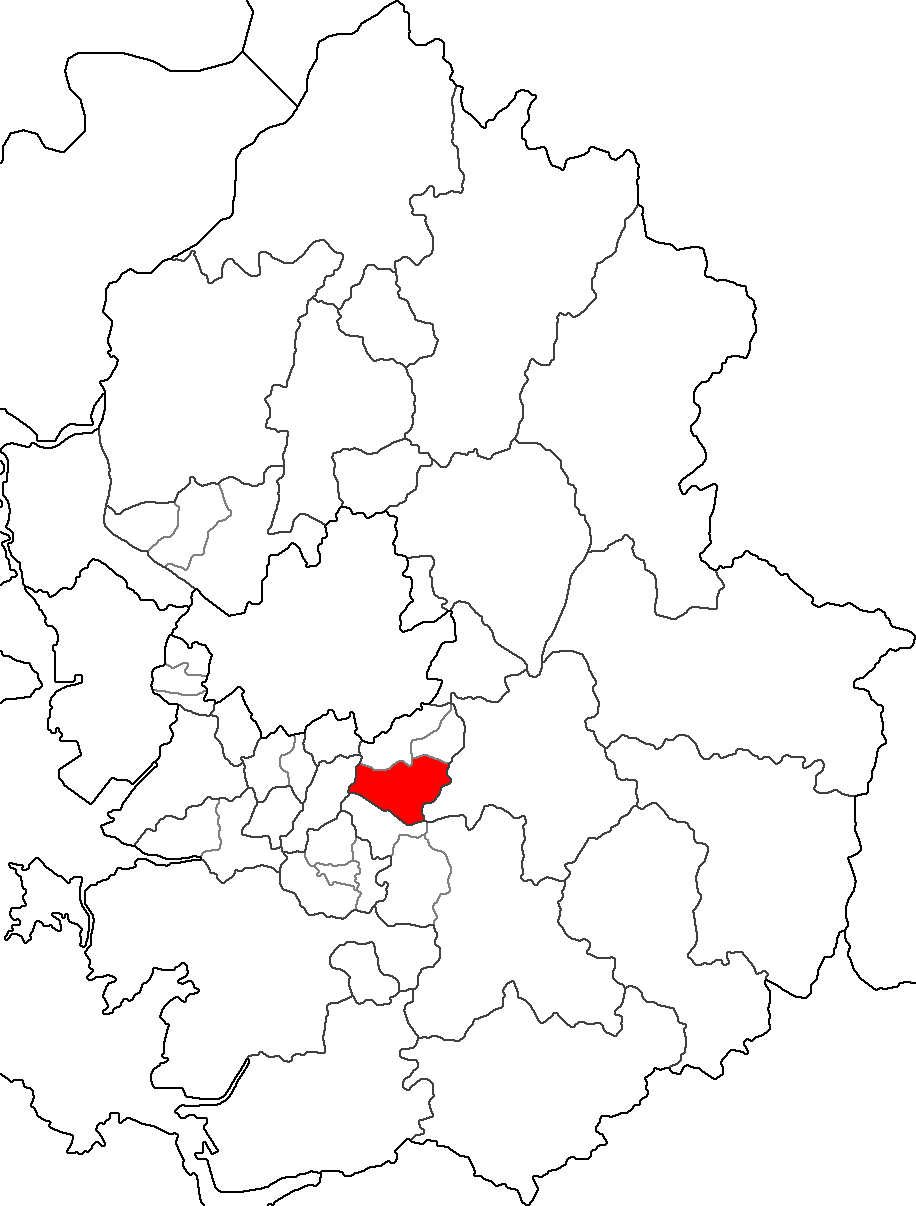
- Map of Gyeonggi highlighting Bundang District.
- Country: South Korea
- Region: Sudogwon (Gijeon)
- Province: Gyeonggi
- City: Seongnam
- Administrative divisions: 19 dong

Area
  - Total: 69.44 km^{2} (26.81 sq mi)

Population (2007)
  - Total: 439,395
  - Dialect: Seoul
- Website: Bundang-gu Office

Korean name
- Hangul: 분당구
- Hanja: 盆唐區
- RR: Bundang-gu
- MR: Pundang-gu

Bundang District (Korean: 분당구) is the largest and most populous district (gu) of Seongnam, a major city in the Seoul Capital Area, South Korea. Bundang District is one of South Korea's wealthiest and highest developed areas, being the nation's first and largest completely artificial city built in the early 1990s. Many high-rise luxury condos moved in the early 2000s, with a second planned city built in the late 2000s called Pangyo in the same district. Apartment prices are the second highest in Gyeonggi Province after Gwacheon and 7th highest nationwide, higher than many central Seoul districts such as Mapo District or Jongno District. Apartments around Pangyo station and the high-rise luxury condos around Jeongja station and Sunae station rival prices in the most expensive areas in the country. Unlike older cities such as Seoul, Bundang has no telephone poles overground, resulting in a clean cityscape with well-designed streets.

Bundang is the headquarters of Korea's leading IT companies such as Naver and KT. Pangyo's Techno Valley is home to the country's leading game, entertainment and technology companies such as KakaoTalk, Samsung Techwin, AhnLab, Nexon, NCSOFT, Webzen and Hancom. Due to its close proximity to Seoul's affluent commercial center, Gangnam District, many residents also commute to Gangnam station via the Shinbundang Line, which takes only 15 minutes from Jeongja station. The Bundang Line subway connects many of the city's popular commercial areas to southeast Seoul, Yongin and Suwon. The city has a well-developed bus network reaching Seoul's central districts in 30~40 minutes due to being located at an intersection of Gyeongbu Expressway and Seoul Ring Expressway.

Bundang is home to many Koreans who lived overseas and the European-styled cafe streets serving brunch and pastas in Pangyo Avenue France, Baekhyeon-dong and Jeongja-dong reflect their culture. The city has a high percentage of parks and greenspace, most notably Bundang Central Park and Yuldong Park, which is built around the Bundang lake. The Tancheon features a jogging course. Bundang's Seoul National University Hospital is among the largest in South Korea.

== History ==
=== Before 1989 ===
Since the Joseon dynasty, the land Bundang currently occupies was a part of Gwangju (then county); at the time, Seongnam only had Sujeong and Jungwon gus. This largely agricultural area was nothing like the present day, dotted as it was with dozens of small villages. Before the early 1990s, Bundang was a large farmland of rice paddies.

=== After 1989 ===
The local government announced on April 27, 1989, that it would undertake construction of a futuristic and environmentally conscious city with a population of 450,000 people. Sixteen dongs in the surrounding area were to be amalgamated into a single city. This would include nine dongs from Dolma-myeon: Bundang-dong, Sunae-dong, Seohyeon-dong, Jeongja-dong, Imae-dong, Yatap-dong, Dochon-dong, Yeosu-dong and Yul-dong; in addition to six dongs from Nakseng-myeon: Gumi-dong, Baekhyun-dong, Dongwon-dong, Geumgok-dong, Sampyeong-dong and Gungnae-dong; and one dong from Daewong-myeon: Sasong-dong (now Pangyo-dong). Bundang was adopted as this new district's popular name.

In the early 1990s, the Bundang area became a planned community as a response to alleviating the excessive demand for apartments in the similarly affluent, but much older Gangnam area. Before this period of expansion, however, there was mostly farmland in this area. There are still a few farms in the Bundang area, particularly in the Pangyo area. As the demand for more housing continues, Bundang is expected to continue expanding.

The primary site of construction was situated along a ten kilometer strip of the Gyeongbu Expressway, with the expectation that high quality homes would be built there. The government assigned the heavy responsibility of carrying out its construction plans to the Korea Land Corporation, a government-owned construction company that had carried out other large scale construction projects in the country. Throughout the development process there were mass demonstrations of local residents protesting the construction, petitions, and demands for countermeasures against the redevelopment project. Despite these numerous difficulties, through dialogue and compromise residents, construction was completed with little incident. Construction began on August 30, 1989, and was completed on December 31, 1996, at a cost of 4.16 trillion won.

== Education ==
Bundang has 37 elementary schools, 25 middle schools including Saetbyoul Middle School, and 24 high schools, also 1 university, and 1 graduate school.

Bundang is also the site of Korea International School, located in Baekhyun-dong with an American curriculum for the expatriate and English-proficient Korean community. On the outskirts of Bundang there is an IB World School with a boarding program for foreign students called Gyeonggi Suwon International School (GSIS). Given its relative affluence, many private language academies are located in Bundang.

=== Schools ===
- Saetbyoul Middle School

== Economy ==
Bundang has the reputation of being one of the richest parts of Gyeonggi Province. Bundang is home to Gyeonggi Province's only international banks, Citibank and HSBC. Their presence serves to further solidify Bundang's reputation as an upscale area. A total of 174 companies in Bundang employ 29,783 people. This also includes several notable corporations, including the corporate headquarters of Korea Telecom, better known as KT and leading Korean internet portal Naver as well as SK C&C, a top IT services company. In addition, the state-owned Korea Land Corporation and Korea Gas Corporation both had their headquarters in Bundang.

Since then, Kogas has moved to Daegu, and Korea Land Corporation has moved to Jinju innovation city as part of the South Korean government decentralization drive, along with giant Kepco's move to Naju, south of Gwangju Metro.

Nowcom has its headquarters in Bundang, as well as Plantynet Co., Ltd. and subsidiary A&G Modes.

The Korea AI Safety Institute is also based in the district.

== Culture and tourism ==
There are some ancient relics, sights or buildings of note. There are, however, two pleasant parks which have been established for residents' pleasure. Bundang Central Park, east of the road between Seohyeon and Sunae stations, has a lake, fountain, and several old houses, while Yuldong Park, to the east, has a larger reservoir. Yuldong Park had a bungee jumping platform, 45 m high, but it was demolished in late 2024.

Bundang is also home to St. John's Church, which is one of the largest Roman Catholic buildings on the Asian continent. It is conspicuously located in the eastern part of Bundang. It employs a balance of both modern as well as gothic-style architecture, and features a replica of Michelangelo's Pietà; one of only three in the world officially authorized by the Vatican.

Residents can enjoy musical and theatrical performances as well as art exhibitions at the Seongnam Arts Center, which is located in Imae-dong. There are ten public libraries in the Bundang area, including the Seongnam Central Library in Yatap-dong (also has a swimming pool for the local resident), the Bundang Culture and Information Center in Jeongja-dong, Seongnam City Gumi Library in Gumi-dong and Rainbow library in Gumi-dong. For Yatap-dong, not only the library but one of the Bus Terminal and a big shopping mall is located

Also, in Jeong-Ja Dong, there are many cafes and bakeries known as "Cafe Street".

There are several nightlife areas, most notably the streets around Seohyeon station, the quieter, more restaurant-oriented area around Sunae station, and the junction under which lies Migeum station. The nightlife areas of Bundang are more wholesome than those in the rest of Seongnam (infamous for love hotels and places of dubious nature and the red light district in Joong-dong).

Seoul National University Bundang Hospital, Bundang Cha Hospital and Bundang Jesaeng Hospital are also located in Bundang.

== Transportation ==
Bundang is served well by public transport, with many buses, and an underground railway. The Bundang Line connects to the Seoul Underground network at Moran, Bokjeong, Suseo, Dogok and Seolleung stations. Recently, it has been extended south into the city of Yongin, and further extensions to this line are planned, with it being intended to stretch south to Giheung before sweeping west to Suwon and eventually even to Incheon.

The Airport Limousine, which runs to both Gimpo and Incheon airports, has several stops in Bundang including Seohyeon station, Sunae station, Jeongja station, Migeum station, Ori station, Imae station and Yatap station.

The Shinbundang Line, which connects to the Seoul Subway at Gangnam station, has several stations with a third being constructed. Bundang is also close to Seoul Ring Expressway and Gyeongbu Expressway.

=== Buses ===
==== Transit buses to Seoul ====
Transit (commuter) buses are called Wide Area Lines in Seoul and with red color. Some buses operated by companies in Gyeonggi Province are in different colors (as in the picture below). Those buses are filled to capacity during rush hour.

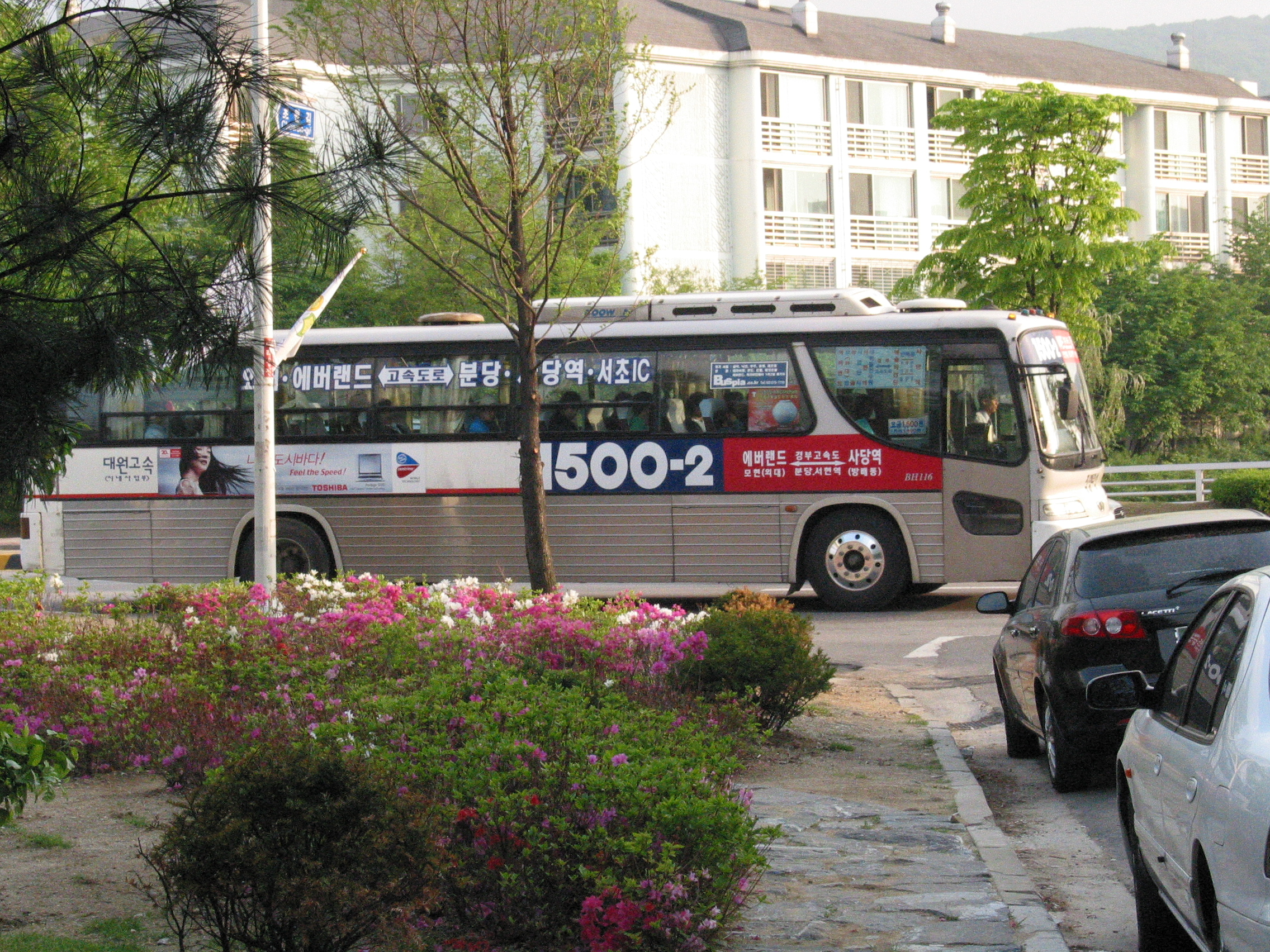
Bus No.1500-2 near Yuldong Park

Buses to Seoul are numbered in the 9000s and 9400s and serve most districts in Seoul. Bus 1150 and 5500-1 also goes through Bundang and into Central Seoul area. 1005-1 Bus goes to Central Seoul, but goes through Gangnam area, Southern Seoul, first. 9407, 9414 and 9607 go to Samsung station area, and 1500-2 goes through Bundang to Nambu Bus Terminal and Sadang station. New 8100s buses are more direct routes through Bundang to parts of Seoul. They do not stop at every station in Bundang and have select pickup stops.

==== Local Buses ====
There are many local buses and village buses, usually green or yellow in color. Some are blue colored. They connect smaller areas with each other in, or just outside, Bundang.

==== Inter-city buses ====
Bundang has an express bus terminal in Yatap-dong located near Yatap station with several bus routes throughout the Gyeonggi province as well as all of the Republic of Korea. There is also a bus service called the Airport Limousine with direct service to both Incheon International Airport and Gimpo Airport.

=== Subways ===
Bundang Line is a commuter subway line of the Korean National Railroad. It was first constructed for the commuters of Bundang which the name 'Bundang Line' came from. It serves southeastern Seoul and Seongnam. Originally opened in September 1994 between Suseo station and Ori station, it was extended from Suseo to Seolleung in September 2003. It stretched 18.5 km from Seolleung to Ori, but as of 2005, it stretches from Seolleung to Bojeong.

Shinbundang Line allows Bundang residents to commute to Gangnam station of Seoul in 15 min. The line was opened in October 2011 and connects with the Bundang Line at Jeongja station. Pangyo station is also on the line and it became a transfer station with the Yeoju Line. Migeum station will open with Shinbundang's Phase 2 in April 2018. The subway is operated automatically.

Gyeonggang Line is a commuter line from Pangyo station to Yeoju

In Bundang, taxis are very common. There are available taxis in busy areas such as subway stations. There are two types of taxis: an "ordinary" (ilban; 일반) taxi and a "model" (mobeom; 모범) taxi, which is painted black and is bigger (in size) and much more expensive than the former ones.

=== Roads ===
==== Streets ====
Streets of Bundang are partly organized like a grid. The main road is Seongnam Daero (Seongnam Boulevard) which runs through Moran station, Seohyeon station, Sunae station, Jeongja station to Ori station.

==== Expressways ====
Bundang is close to Seoul Ring Expressway, Seoul-Yongin Expressway, and Gyeongbu Expressway. Furthermore, Bundang has two expressways connected to Cheongdam Bridge in Han River and Gangnam District.

== Shopping ==
Notable shopping malls include AK Plaza, previously Samsung Plaza, at Seohyeon station, Lotte Department Store at Sunae station, New Core, Home plus and Kim's Club at Yatap station, 2001 Outlet at Migeum station, Nonghyup Hanaro Mart, Homeplus at Ori station and Hyundai Department Store at Pangyo station. There are also big movie theaters at Ori, Seohyeon and Yatap stations. The CGV movie theatre inside Hyundai Department Store at Pangyo station features a 4D theatre.

== Administration ==
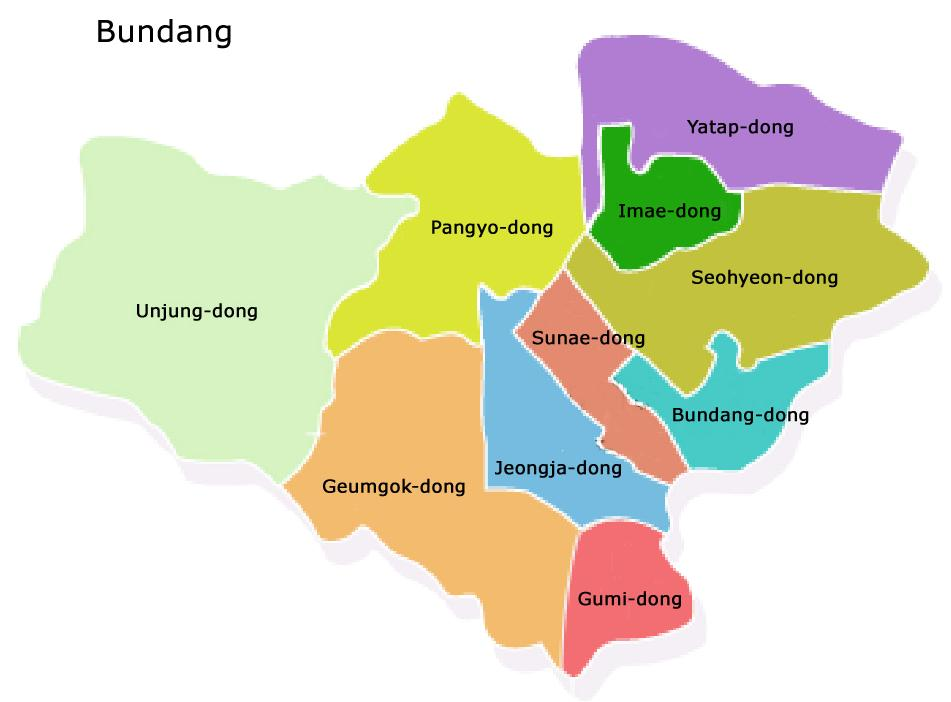
Administrative Division of Bundang

Bundang is divided into 22 dong (동, "neighborhoods"):

- Baekhyeon-dong (백현동)
- Bundang-dong (분당동)
- Gumi-dong (구미동)
- Gumi 1-dong (구미1동) [divided into Dongwon-dong and Gumi-dong (동원동, 구미동)]
- Geumgok-dong (금곡동) [divided into Geumgok-dong and Gungnae-dong (금곡동, 궁내동)]
- Imae 1-dong (이매1동)
- Imae 2-dong (이매2동)
- Jeongja dong (정자동)
- Jeongja 1-dong (정자1동)
- Jeongja 2-dong (정자2동)
- Jeongja 3-dong (정자3동)
- Pangyo-dong (판교동)
- Sampyeong-dong (삼평동)
- Seohyeon 1-dong (서현1동) [divided into Seohyeon-dong and Yuldong (서현동, 율동)]
- Seohyeon 2-dong (서현2동) [divided into Seohyeon-dong and Yuldong (서현동, 율동)]
- Sunae 1-dong (수내1동)
- Sunae 2-dong (수내2동)
- Sunae 3-dong (수내3동)
- Unjung-dong (운중동) [divided into Unjung-dong, Hasanun-dong, Seogun-dong and Daejang-dong (운중동, 하산운동, 석운동, 대장동)]
- Yatap 1-dong (야탑1동)
- Yatap 2-dong (야탑2동)
- Yatap 3-dong (야탑3동)

== Famous residents ==
- Jang Ja-yeon (actress, 1982–2009)
- Lee Jee-young (professional golfer, born 1985)
- Lee Eun-ju (actress, 1980–2005)
- Lee Soo-young (singer, born 1979)
- Shin Min-a (actress and talents, born 1984)
- Lee Yeon-hee (actress and model, born 1988)
- Yoo In-na (actress, model, and DJ, born 1982)
- Jennie (singer, rapper, and actress, born 1996), member of K-Pop girl group BLACKPINK
- Kim Si-hyeon (singer and host, born 1999), leader and member of K-Pop girl group Everglow
- Heejin (singer, born 2000), member of K-Pop girl groups Loona, its sub-unit Loona 1/3, and Artms
- Yeonjun (singer, born 1999), member of K-Pop boy group TXT
- Karina (singer, born 2000), leader and member of K-Pop girl group Aespa
- Hong Seong-jun (singer, born 1999), member of K-Pop boy group BDC
- Shin Ji-yoon (singer, born 2002), member of K-Pop girl group Weeekly
- Kyujin (singer, born 2006), member of K-Pop girl group NMIXX

== Photos ==
Bundang, South Korea

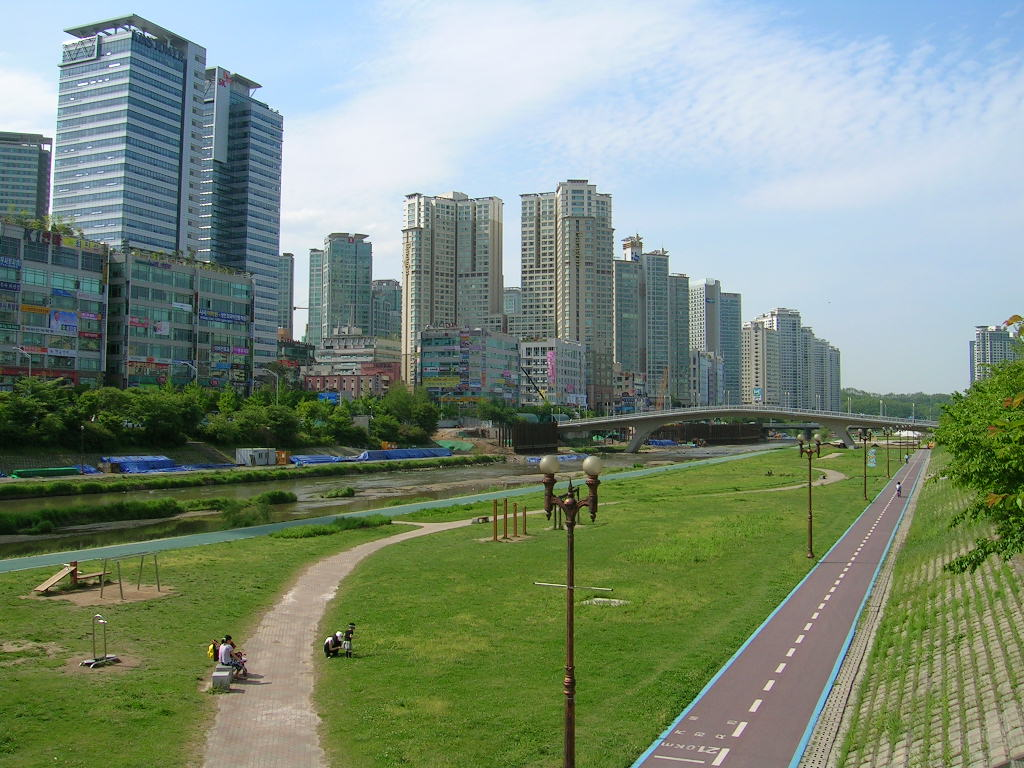
Bundang, South Korea

A restaurant in Bundang

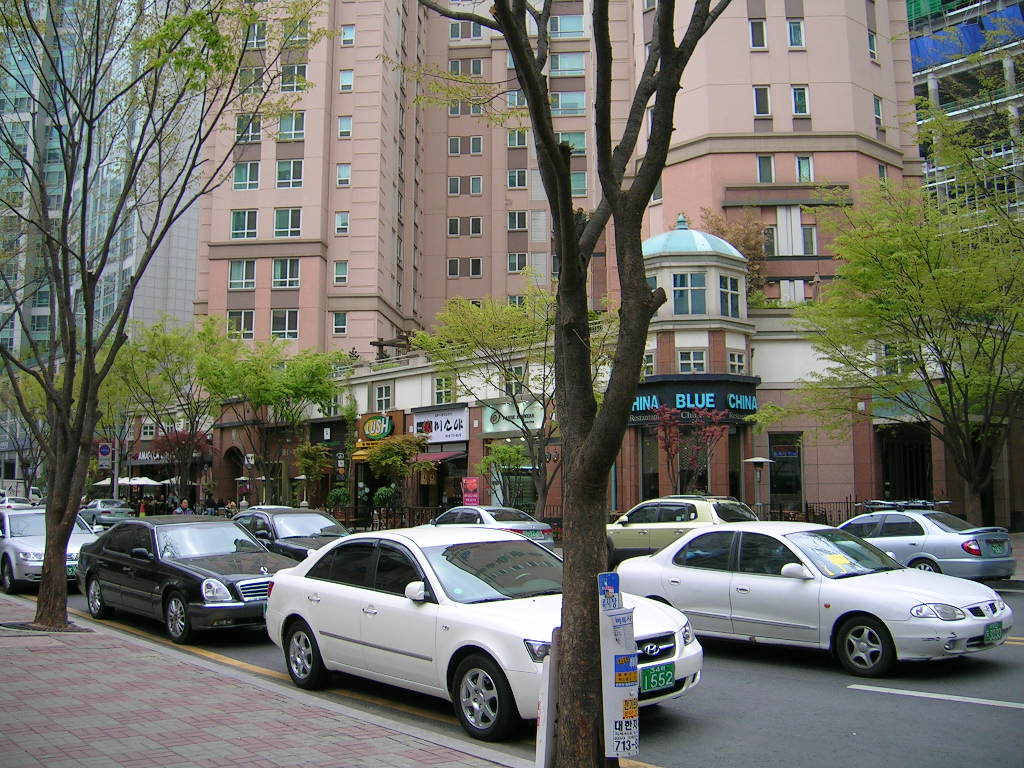
Bundang, South Korea

A pet iguana in Bundang

Bundang, South Korea

Apartment Buildings

== See also ==
- Administrative divisions of South Korea
- Bundang High School
- Bundang Line
- Pangyo Techno Valley
