= Bundang-dong =

Neighborhood in Seongnam, South Korea

Coordinates: 37.370°N 127.131°E

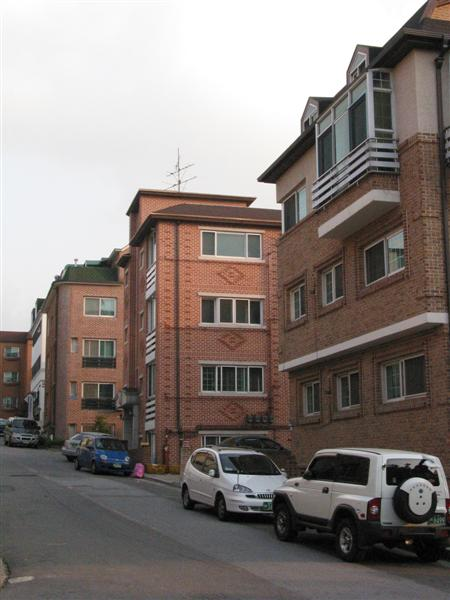
- One of the streets of Bundang-dong
- Interactive map of Bundang-dong
- Country: South Korea
- Region: Gyeonggi Province

Area
  - Total: 3.40 km^{2} (1.31 sq mi)

Population (2007)
  - Total: 31,186
  - Density: 9,170/km^{2} (23,800/sq mi)

Korean name
- Hangul: 분당동
- Hanja: 盆塘洞
- RR: Bundang-dong
- MR: Pundang-dong

Bundang-dong (Korean: 분당동) is one of the 19 dongs of Bundang District, Seongnam, South Korea. The total area is 3.40 km^{2}, with a population of 31,186 (as of April 2007). It is a quiet residential area with trees and parks, located at the foot of Bulgok Mountain. Taehyeon Park is close to the residential area. Different from other areas in Bundang District, houses in Bundang-dong mainly consist of 3-story villas and studio apartments rather than high-rise apartments. This quiet place has several upscale cafes and restaurants which attract people looking for a quiet place rather than busy places like Seohyeon Station. Bundang-dong consists of two small towns, Saetbyul town and Jangan town. It is close to Bundang Central Park and Yuldong Park. Two elementary schools (Dangchon and Jangan elementary schools) and Daejin High School lie in Bundang-dong. The famous St. John's Cathedral is near Yuldong Park.

== History ==
The name 'Bundang-dong' comes from Bunjeom-ri and Dangwu-ri which used to be the Bundang-dong area. It became a part of Seongnam and was named Bundang-dong in 1973. It became a part of Jungwon District, Seongnam in 1989, and finally became one of dongs of Bundang District.
