= Gumi-dong =

Neighborhood in Seongnam, South Korea

- Hangul: 구미동
- Hanja: 九美洞
- RR: Gumi-dong
- MR: Kumi-dong

Gumi-dong (Korean: 구미동) is one of the 19 dongs of Bundang District, Seongnam, Gyeonggi Province. It has total area of 4.77 km^{2} (3.4% of Seongnam). As of April 30, 2006, there are 38,022 residents in Gumi-dong.

Gumi-dong is located at the southernmost part of Bundang, bordering Yongin, Geumgok-dong and Jeongja-dong.

Seoul National University Bundang Hospital is located in Gumi-dong near Bulgok Mountain. Also, Nonghyup Hanaro Mart, CGV Multiplex are in this area.

== History ==
The southern part of Gumi-dong was called Gumi-ri, Sujin-myeon, Yongin in Joseon Dynasty. In 1914, the Japanese included some part of surrounding areas in Gumi-ri. In 1989, it was a part of Jungwon District and in 1991 it became one of the "dong"s of Bundang when Bundang became one of the "gu"s of Seongnam.
