= Seohyeon-dong =

Neighborhood in Seongnam, South Korea

- Hangul: 서현동
- Hanja: 書峴洞
- RR: Seohyeon-dong
- MR: Sŏhyŏn-dong

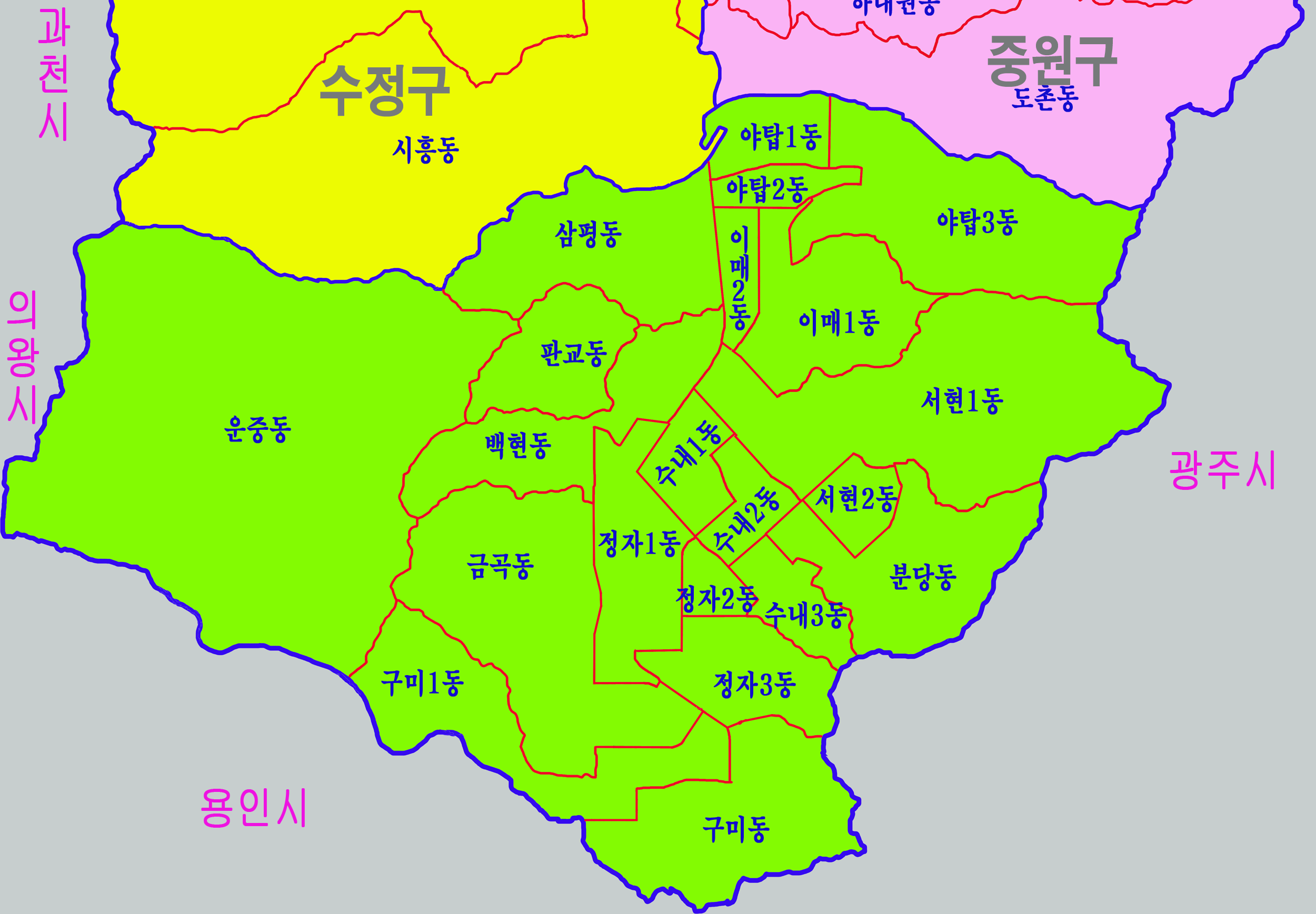
A map of the various areas in Bundang. Seohyun 1 is the district that reaches the furthest right, and Seohyun 2 is the smaller district below it.

Seohyeon-dong (Korean: 서현동) refers to two of the 19 dongs of Bundang-gu, Seongnam, South Korea, Seohyeon-1-dong and Seohyeon-2-dong. The total area is 8.36 km^{2}, with a population of 52,950, 32,686 in Seohyeon-1-dong (7.57 km^{2}) (May 2014) and 20,264 in Seohyeon-2-dong (0.79 km^{2}) (May 2014). To the south, there is Sunae-dong. To the north, there is Imae-dong. To the west, there are Baekhyeon-dong and Pangyo-dong. To the east, there are Bundang-dong and Gwangju city. It includes the busiest place in Bundang, AK Plaza. Ak plaza's clock tower is the most famous meeting place in Bundang.

== History ==
'Seohyeon' is named after Don-seo-chon (Seo) and Yang-hyeon-ri (Hyeon). This area was called 'Seohyeon-ri' in 1914, and it was included in Seongnam in 1973. In 1992, it became Seohyeon-dong of Bundang.

== Transportation and roads ==
- Bundang Line Seohyeon Station
- Gyeongbu Expressway
- Seoul Ring Expressway
- Seoul-Yongin Expressway
- Seongnam Avenue
- Yanghyun Street
- Seohyun Street
- Dolma Street

== Hospitals ==
- Bundang Jesaeng Hospital
- Medipia
- Korean Jaseng Hospital

== Schools ==
- Seohyun Elementary School
- Bundang Elementary School
- Seohyun Middle School
- Seohyun High School
