= Bundang High School =

Bundang Senior High School
- Bundang, Seongnam, Gyeonggi; South Korea

Information
- Type: Public
- Motto: Bundang Standing Proud
- Established: 1992
- Faculty: 80 (as of 2015)
- Grades: 10–12
- Enrollment: 1,297 (as of 2010)
- Campus: Urban, 26,800 square metres (6.62 acres)
- Colors: Green, silver, and white
- Tree: Ginkgo biloba
- Flower: Forsythia
- Affiliations: SOE; GEPIK; GAOG
- Website: www.bundang.hs.kr

Bundang Senior High School (Korean: 분당고등학교; Hanja: 盆唐高等學校), commonly referred to as Bundang Senior High School, is a co-educational, comprehensive, community high school located in Bundang, South Korea as part of the Seongnam public schools.

As of the 2024 school year, the school has an enrollment of 809 students and 88 classroom teachers (for a student-teacher ratio of 9.19). Prior to 2005, the school was ranked second in selectivity among its fifteen peer schools (district metrics were abolished that year and school admission reorganized into a lottery in accordance with the elimination of the high school entrance exams).

== School history ==
- January 5, 1992: Bundang High School established (24 classes)
- March 1, 1992: First principal Lee Jung-seop takes office
- June 17, 1992: School building completed
- October 12, 1992: Opening of school (4 transfer students)
- February 14, 1995: 1st graduation ceremony (388 people)
- January 31, 1998: Completion of Yeji Hall and auditorium
- April 30, 2002: Expansion of the main building and Yeji Hall
- September 1, 2022: Inauguration of the 11th principal Kim Jeong-ok

== Location ==
Bundang High School is situated near the Tancheon tributary, in Sunae (neighborhood), Bundang (district), Seongnam (city), Gyeonggi (province), 330 meters southeast of Sunae Station on the Bundang Line (yellow line), and 500 meters west-southwest of Bundang Central Park. The school is 20 kilometers southeast of downtown Seoul.

== University Admission ==
Despite district realignment in 2005, Bundang matriculates students each year to all three SKY universities, to pre-medical and pre-dentistry programs (의치계열), and to the most selective teachers college (교대). For 2005-2010 the school graduated a total of fifteen students to KAIST, Postech, the military academy (사관학교), and Japan's top engineering programs (일본공대).

== Sister School ==
- Naemyeon High School, Hongcheon, Gangwon-do (1999)

== See also ==
- Bundang
- Bundang HS Debating Club
- Education in Korea
- Korean-version Wiki (in Korean)
- Seongnam Office of Education

37°22′31.1″N 127°06′58.2″E / 37.375306°N 127.116167°E / 37.375306; 127.116167
