= Sampyeong-dong =

Neighborhood in Seongnam, South Korea

- Hangul: 삼평동
- Hanja: 三坪洞
- RR: Sampyeong-dong
- MR: Samp'yŏng-dong

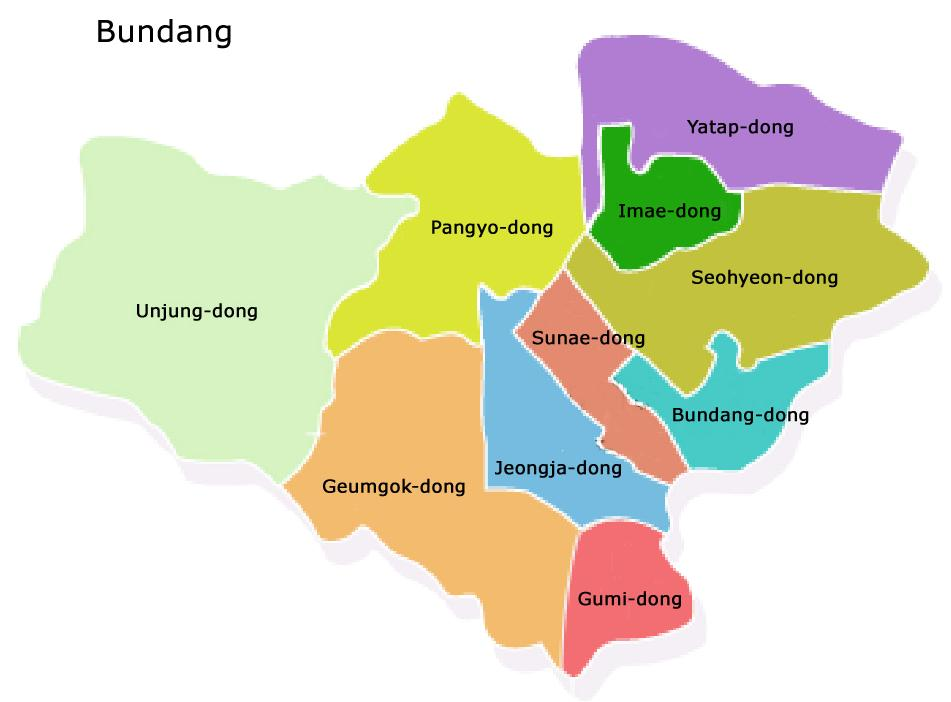
Administrative Divisions of Bundang

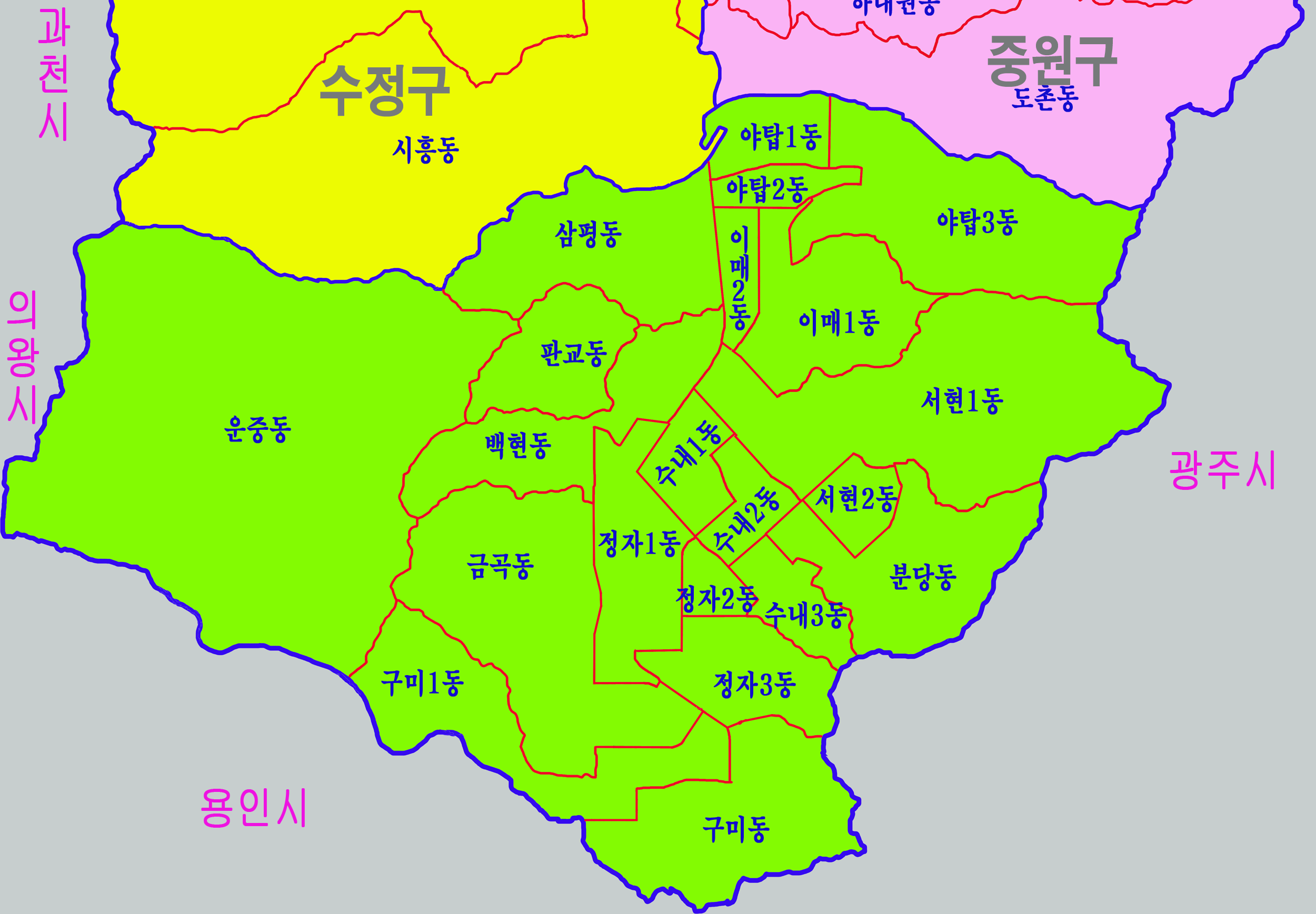
Korean administrative map of Sampyeong-dong; it is located at the northern side of Pangyo-dong in the English map.

Sampyeong-dong (Korean: 삼평동) is a dong of Bundang District in the city of Seongnam, Gyeonggi Province, South Korea. As of January 1, 2024, the population of Sampyeong-dong is 23,939, spanning 9,058 households. It comprises 3.33km^{2} or 4.79% of Bundang-gu. It was formed in 1914 during the Japanese colonial period, when the two villages of Samgeo-ri (삼거리; 三巨里) and Bopyeong-ri (보평리; 洑坪里) are merged, and one character from the hanja of both villages are combined to form Sampyeong-ri (삼평리; 三坪里). It is upgraded to Sampyeong-dong in July 1973, and in December 2008 it got separated from Pangyo-dong.

== Education ==
Sampyeong-dong is home to the following educational institutions:

- Seongnam Songhyun Elementary School [ko] (성남송현초등학교; 城南松峴初等學校)
- Bopyeong Elementary School [ko] (보평초등학교; 洑坪初等學校)
- Sampyeong Middle School [ko] (삼평중학교; 三坪中學校)
- Pangyo High School [ko] (판교고등학교;板橋高等學校)

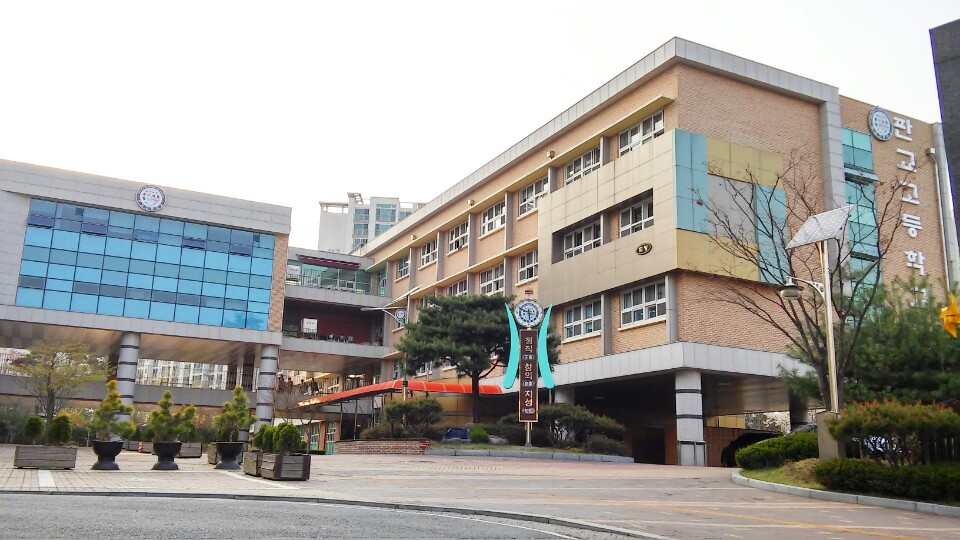
Pangyo High School, a public high school in Sampyeong-dong.

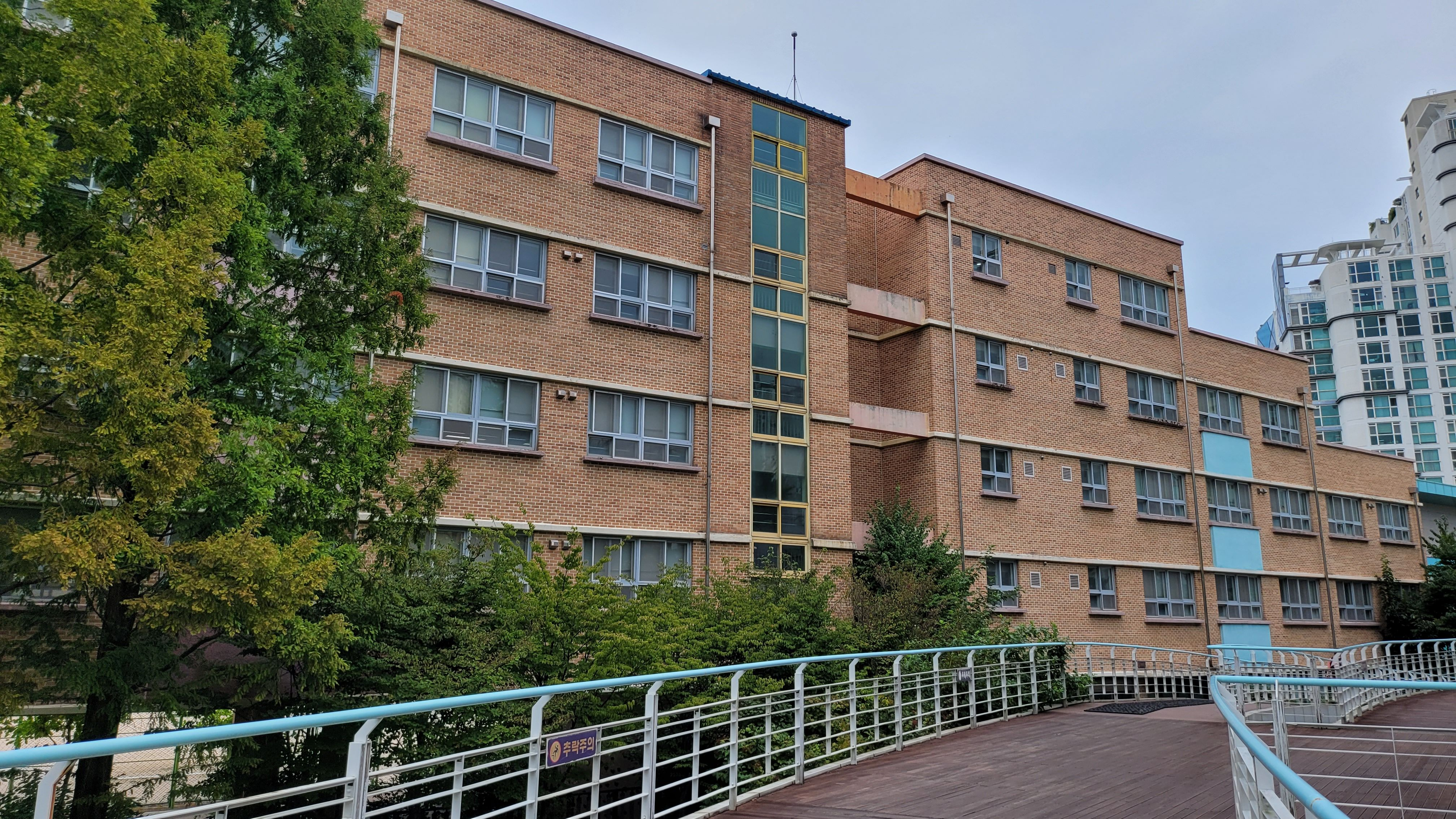
Bopyeong Elementary School, a public elementary school in Sampyeong-dong.
