= Unjung-dong =

Neighborhood in Seongnam, South Korea

Coordinates: 37°23′N 127°04′E

- Hangul: 운중동
- Hanja: 雲中洞
- RR: Unjung-dong
- MR: Unjung-dong

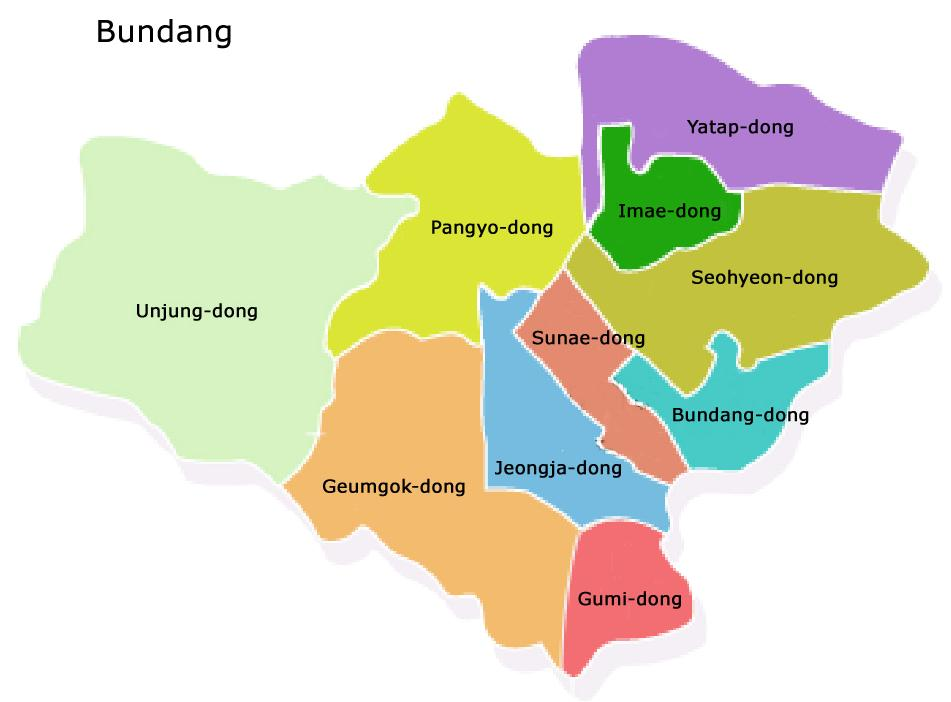
Map of Bundang-gu; Unjung-dong lies at the westernmost part.

Unjung-dong (Korean: 운중동) is one of the 19 dongs of Bundang-gu, in the city of Seongnam, Gyeonggi Province in South Korea. As of July 1, 2024, the population of Unjung-dong is 34,860, spanning 12,681 households. Its area comprises 18.11km^{2} or 12.74% of Bundang-gu. Unjung-dong was formed in 1914 during the Japanese colonial period, when the villages of Jungsanun-ri (중산운리; 中山雲里), Sanun-ri (산운리; 山雲里) and Hasanun-ri (하산운리; 下山雲里) are merged, and one hanja from Sanun-ri and Jungsanun-ri are combined to form its current name. This is also descriptive of its geography as it is located below the peak of Guksabong (국사봉), where clouds often gather, thus its name literally means 'the dong in the middle of the clouds'.

== Education ==
Unjong-dong is home to the following educational institutions:

- Sanun Elementary School [ko] (산운초등학교; 山雲初等學校)
- Unjung Elementary School [ko] (운중초등학교; 雲中初等學校)
- Unjung Middle School [ko] (운중중학교; 雲中中學校)
- Unjung High School [ko] (운중고등학교; 雲中高等學校)
- Pangyo Daejang Elementary School [ko] (판교대장초등학교; 板橋大庄初等學校)
- Pangyo Daejang Middle School [ko] (판교대장중학교; 板橋大庄中學校)
