= Saetbyoul Middle School =

School in Seongnam, South Korea

Coordinates: 37°22′07″N 127°07′45″E

Saetbyoul Middle School (Korean: 샛별중학교) is a public middle school located in Bundang-gu, Seongnam-si, Gyeonggi Province in South Korea. It was established in 2008.

== Uniforms ==
The dongbok (worn in the colder seasons) is a red stripe blouse with a red plaid skirt for girls, and a blue striped blouse and navy pants for boys. There is a white vest with the Saetbyoul logo and a gray jacket for both genders. The habok(worn in the warmer months) is made up of a white shirt with a blue plaid tie and a blue plaid skirt for girls, and a white shirt with no tie and navy pants for boys. There is also a cardigan, that can be worn at any time.

== Facilities ==
There are over 20 classrooms, and many special classrooms, including two science labs, an English Zone, a gym, a computer lab, an art room, a musical room, a tiny field, and a cafeteria which is unusual in Korean schools.
