= Gyeonggi Suwon International School =

- Suwon, Gyeonggi-do; South Korea

Information
- Type: International School
- Religious affiliation: Christian
- Established: 2006; 20 years ago
- Founder: Hyosan International Education Foundation
- Headmaster: Dr. Jaehee Lee
- Grades: JK–12
- Enrollment: 550
- Campus type: Suburban
- Colors: Purple and gold
- Mascot: The Knights
- Website: www.gsis.sc.kr

The Gyeonggi Suwon International School (GSIS) is an international school located in Suwon, Gyeonggi Province, South Korea. GSIS is one of two schools in South Korea accredited by the IBO to offer all three programs: the PYP, MYP and DP. It opened on September 16, 2006 and educates students in junior kindergarten (ages 3–4) to Grade 12.

== Athletics ==
GSIS athletic teams, the Knights, compete in the Korea-American Interscholastic Activities Conference.
