= Bundang Central Park =

Park in Seongnam, South Korea

Coordinates: 37°23′N 127°07′E

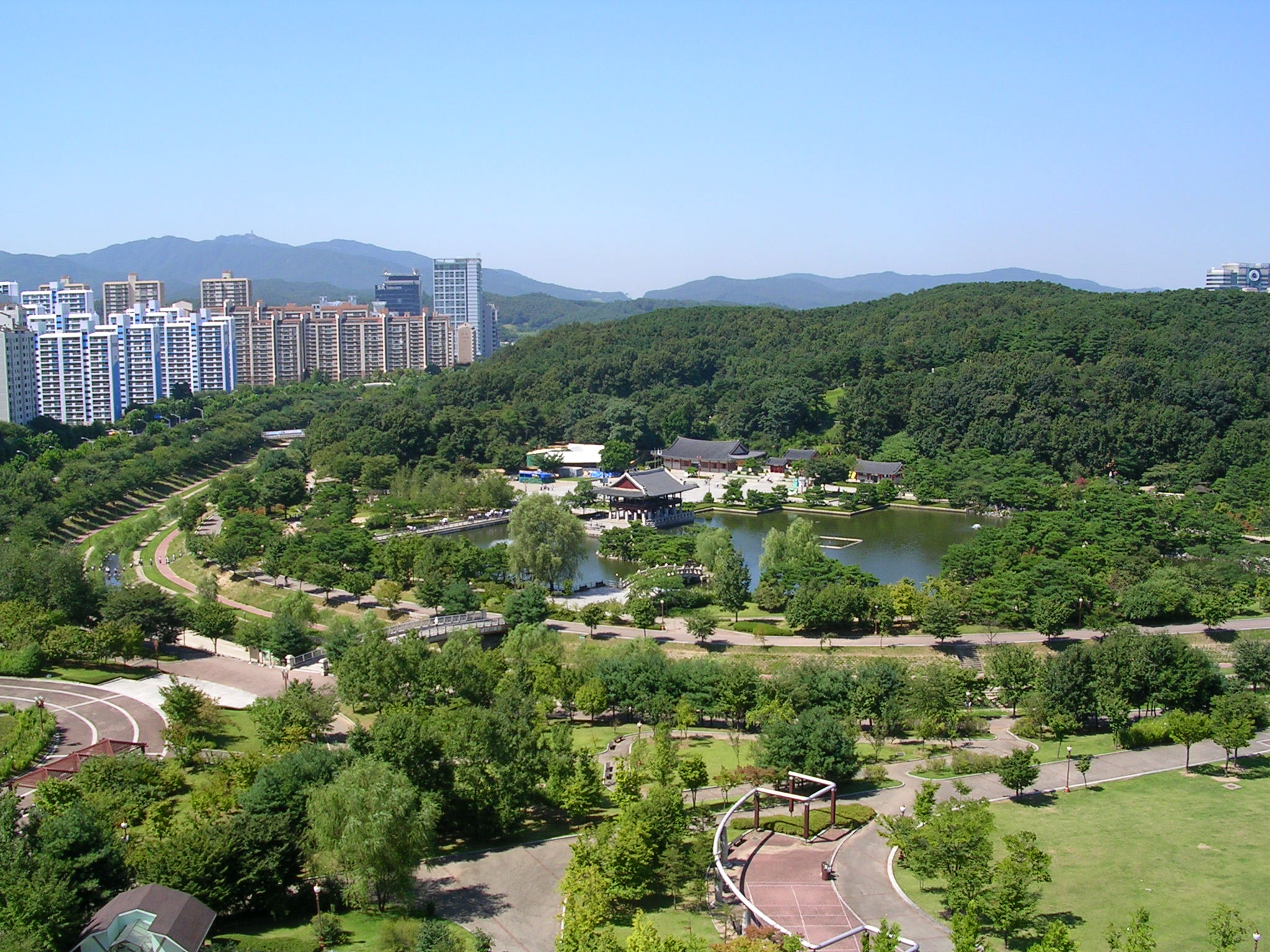
- The park in 2007
- Interactive map of Bundang Central Park
- Area: 42.0982 hectares (104.027 acres)
- Established: July 31, 1994

Korean name
- Hangul: 분당중앙공원
- Hanja: 盆唐中央公園
- RR: Bundang jungang gongwon
- MR: Pundang chungang kongwŏn

Bundang Central Park (Korean: 분당중앙공원) is a public park in Bundang, Seongnam, South Korea. It is one of two large parks in Bundang, with the other being Yuldong Park in Bundang-dong. It is 500 meters away from Seohyeon station.

== Description ==
It has a number of walking paths, grassy spaces, four pavilions, and two parking lots for visitors. It has four badminton courts. There is also a croquet course. In addition, there is an outdoor theater, where performances are held. Bathrooms are also available in the park. It even has a functioning watermill.

The mountain Youngjangsan overlaps with much of the park's area. Bundang Pond (분당호; 盆唐湖) is also present on the grounds. In the pond are a number of fountains, from which water is ejected for occasional displays.

The Sunae-dong House, Gyeonggi Province Cultural Treasure No. 78, is in the park. It is a private home constructed at the end of the Joseon period. It is all that remains of the seventy such homes that once formed the village that previously existed before being demolished to make way for the newer properties in Bundang.

The Hansan Lee Clan Burial Mound, the resting place of prominent members of the Hansan Lee clan, spans 87,000 pyeong. Among them lay civil servants and military officers. It is designated as Gyeonggi Province Cultural Treasure No. 116 on December 29, 1989.

== Gallery ==
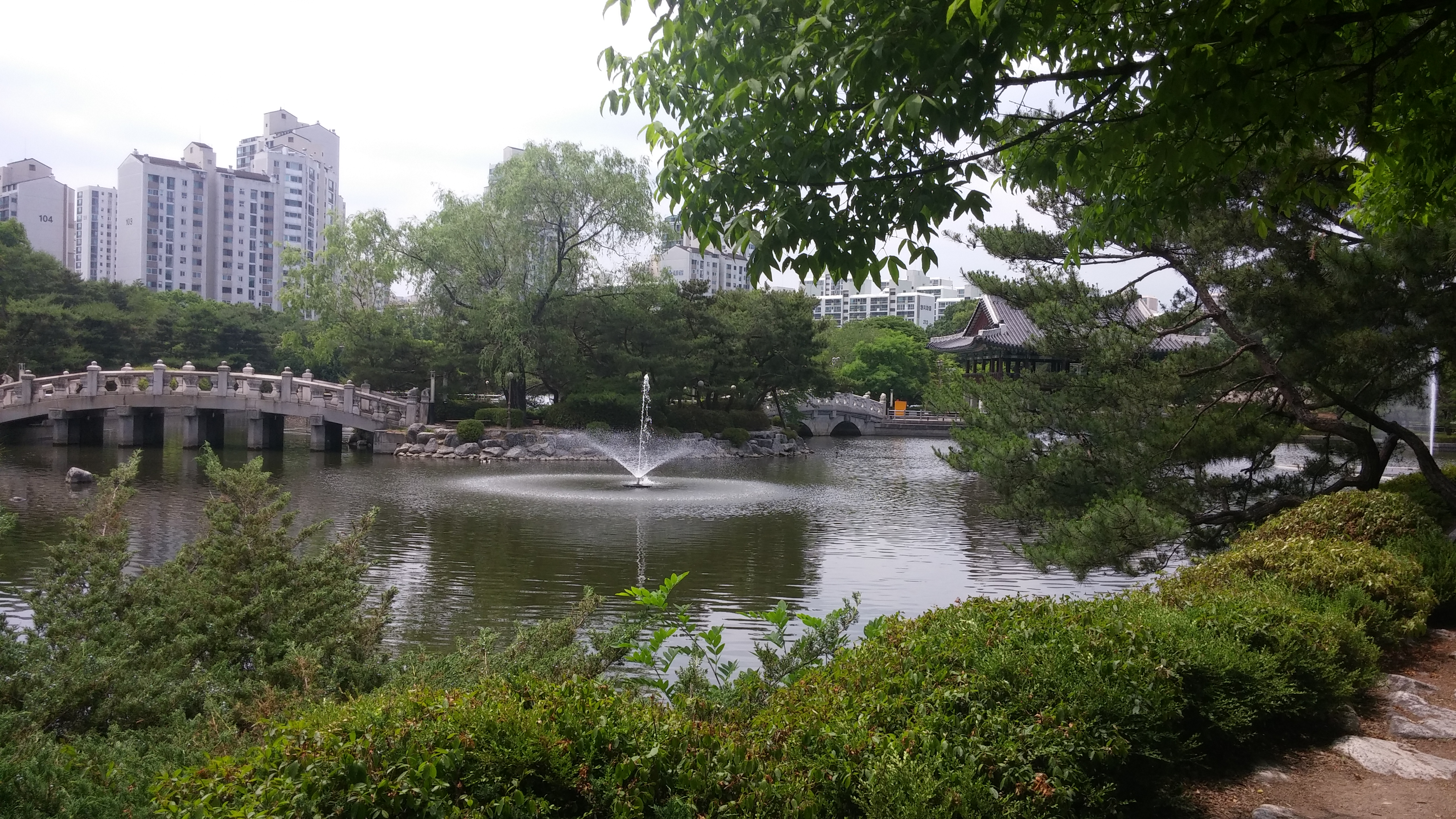
Fountain in the pond (2015)

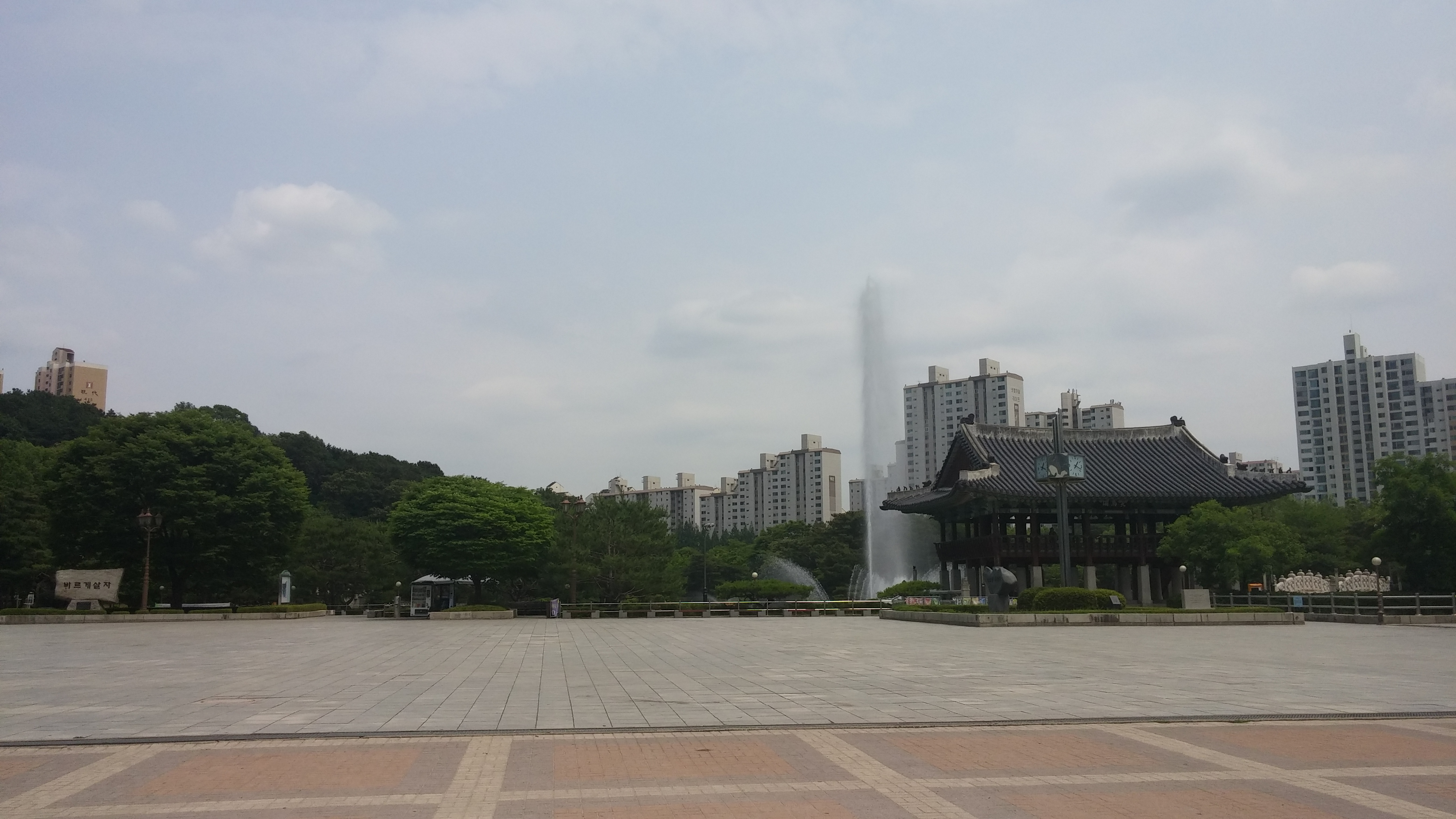
Fountain behind pavilion (2015)

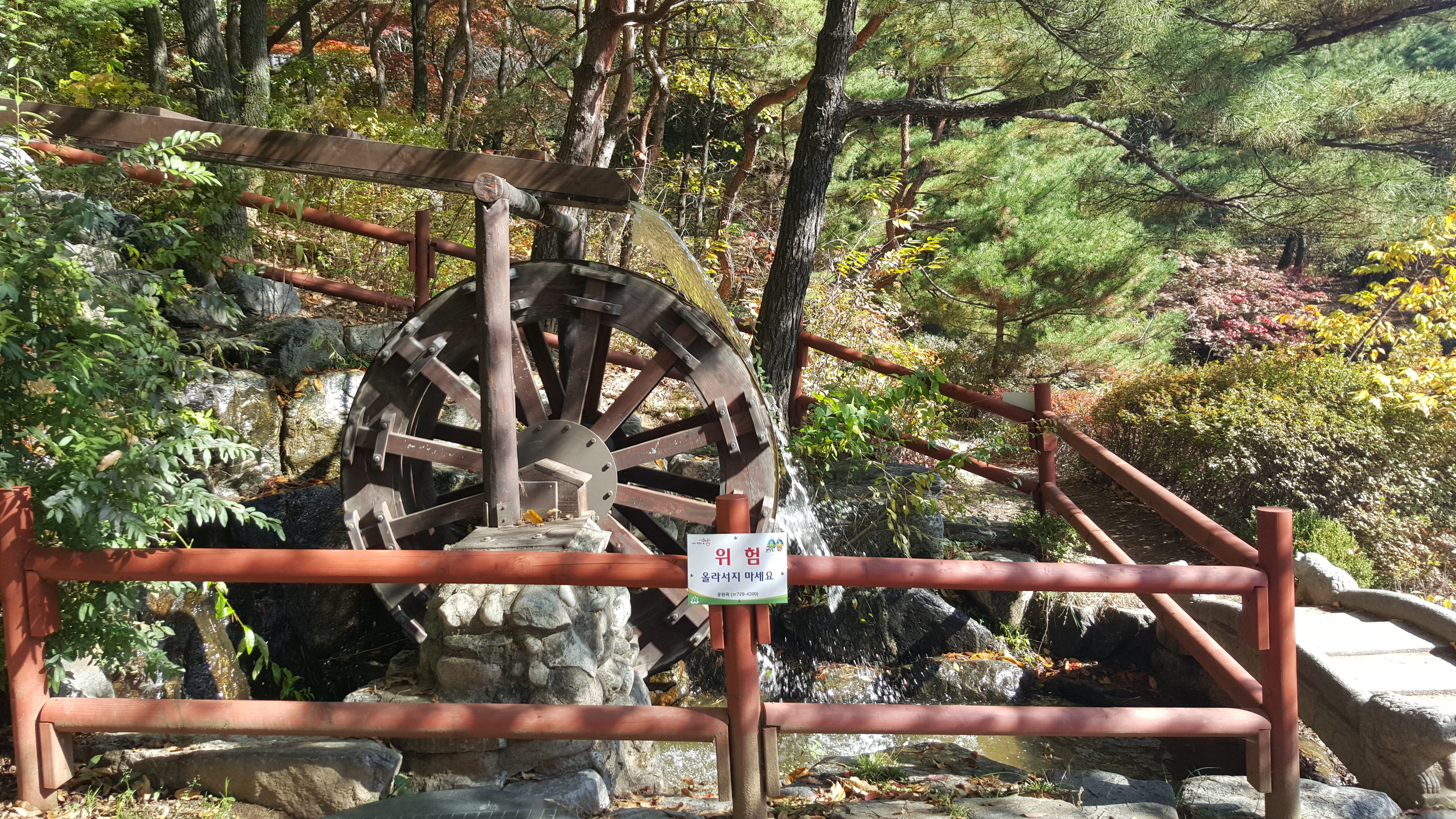
The water wheel (2015)

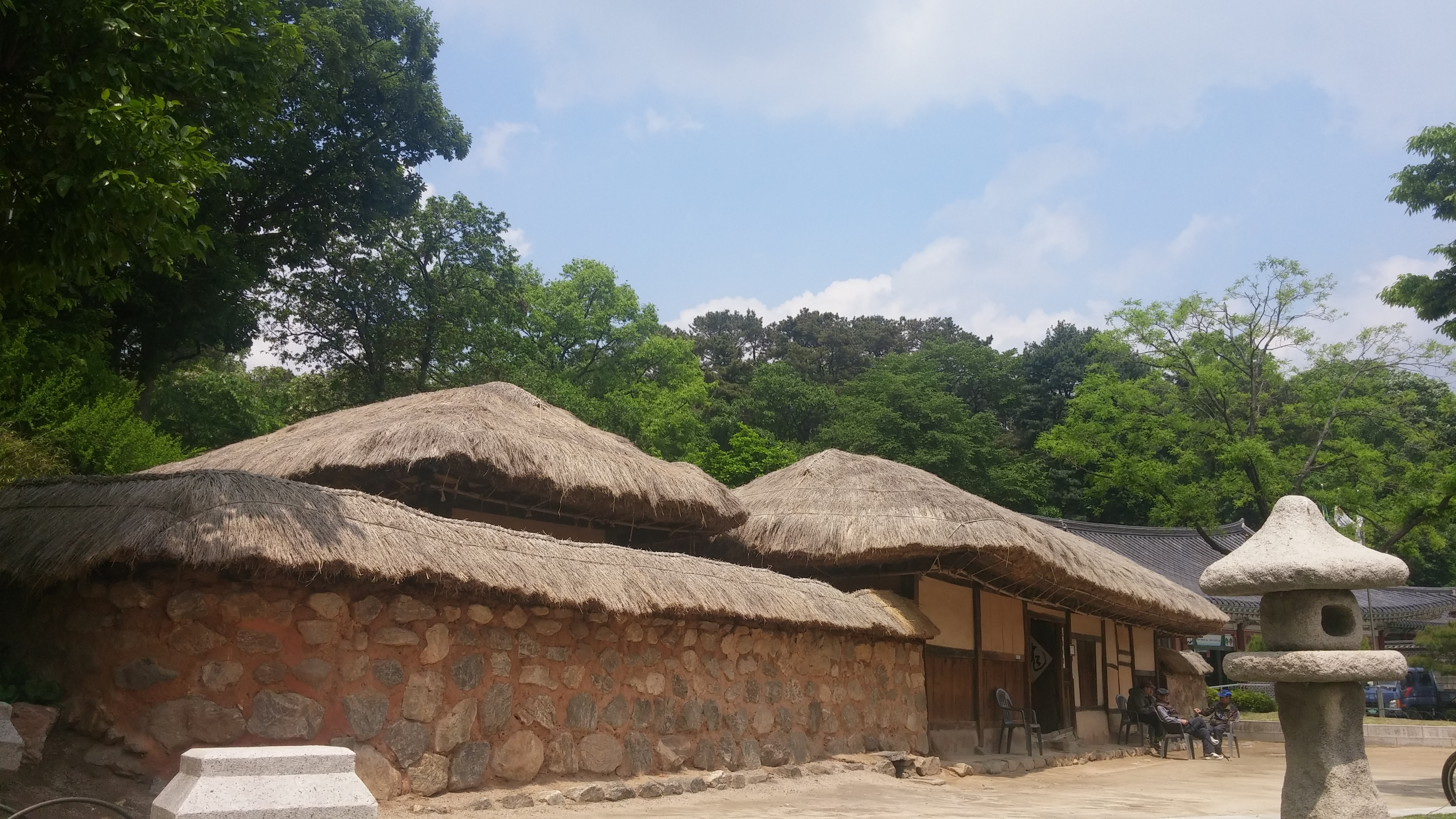
Sunae-dong House

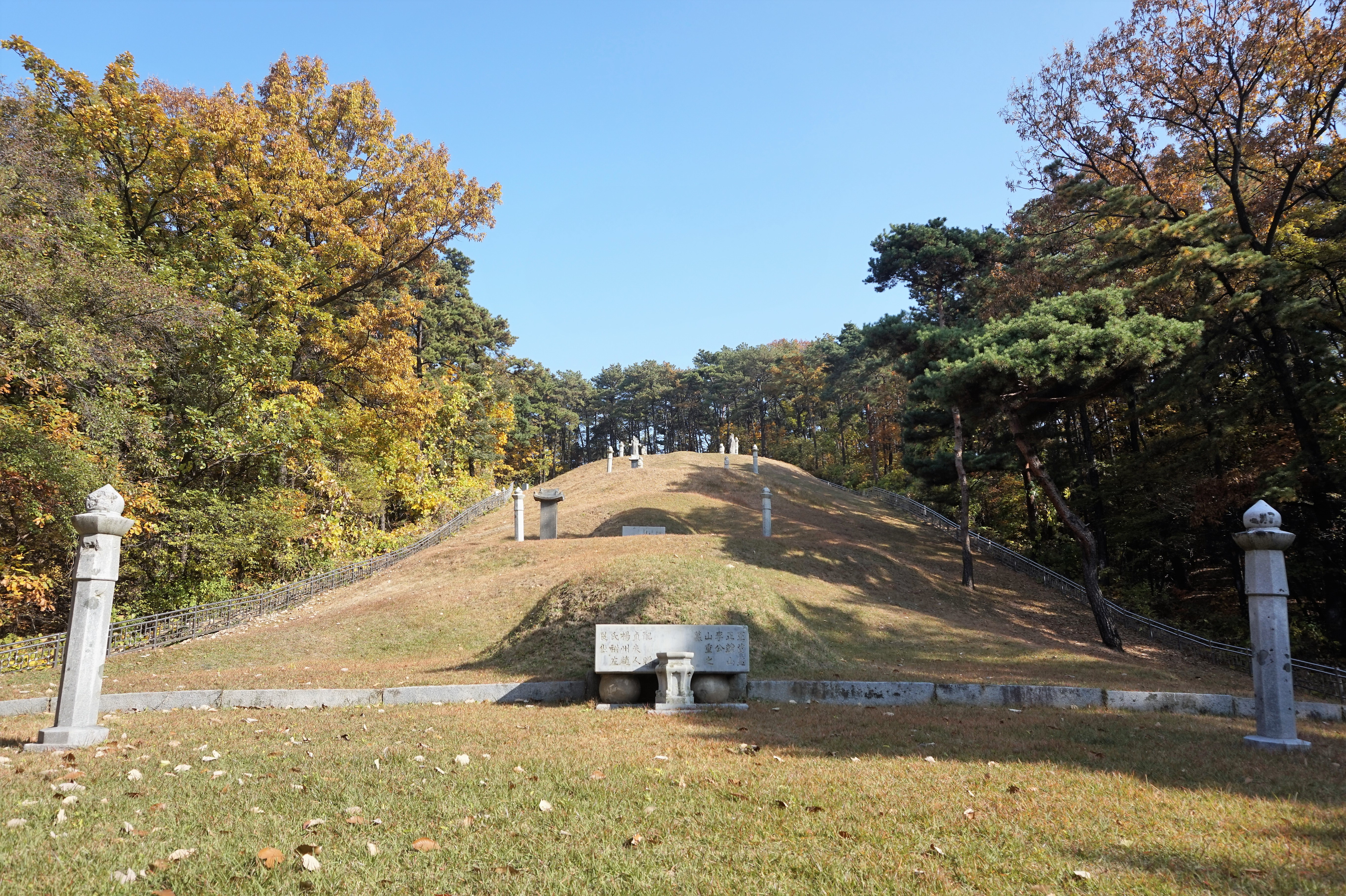
Hansan Lee Burial Mound
