= Yatap-dong =

Neighborhood in Seongnam, South Korea

- Country: South Korea

Korean name
- Hangul: 야탑동
- Hanja: 野塔洞
- RR: Yatap-dong
- MR: Yat'ap-tong

Yatap-dong (Korean: 야탑동) is a Bundang neighborhood in the city of Seongnam, Gyeonggi Province, South Korea. It is officially divided into Yatap-1-dong, Yatap-2-dong, and Yatap-3-dong.

A survey conducted in 2011 by the Ministry of Land, Transport and Maritime Affairs, reported that the bus stops in Yatap-dong are among the busiest in the country.

Yatap-dong is composed of many cultural spaces. Seongnam art center, Tancheon Sports Complex, NC department store, Home Plus are all available in Yatap-dong. CGV Theater and Seongnam bus terminal are there.
