= Jeongja-dong, Seongnam =

Neighborhood in Seongnam, South Korea

Jeongja-dong
- Dong (Neighborhood)
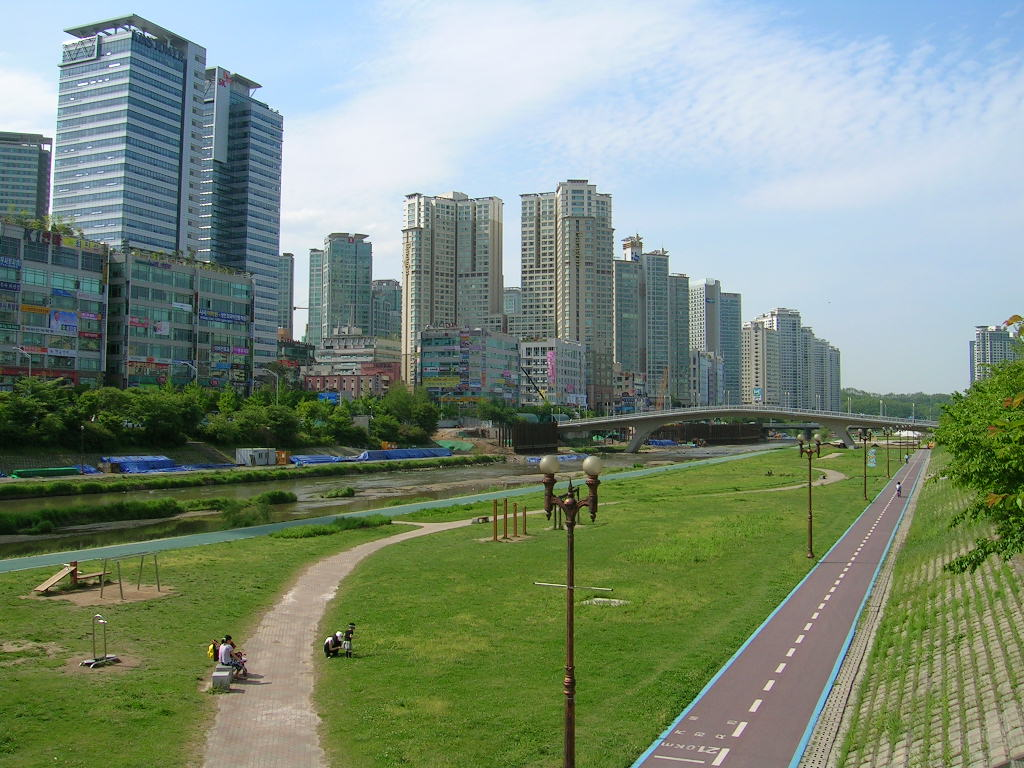
- Jeongja-dong in 2006

- Location within South Korea
- Coordinates: 37°21′57″N 127°07′02″E

Korean name
- Hangul: 정자동
- Hanja: 亭子洞
- RR: Jeongja-dong
- MR: Chŏngja-dong

Jeongja-dong (Korean: 정자동) is a neighbourhood in the Bundang-gu district of Seongnam, Gyeonggi Province, South Korea. It is further subdivided into Jeongja 1-dong through Jeongja 3-dong.

It is well-known for its Café Street, which has a wide variety of restaurants and cafes. Naver Corporation and Korea Telecom are headquartered in the area. The Bundang Police Station is also here.

The area received its name during the mid-Joseon period, when a residence was created in the area for the ruling House of Yi. The name literally means "pavilion"; it received the name because the royal family created pavilions next to the banks of the stream Tancheon that passes through it.
