= Seohyeon station =

Metro station in Seongnam, South Korea

서현; Seohyeon
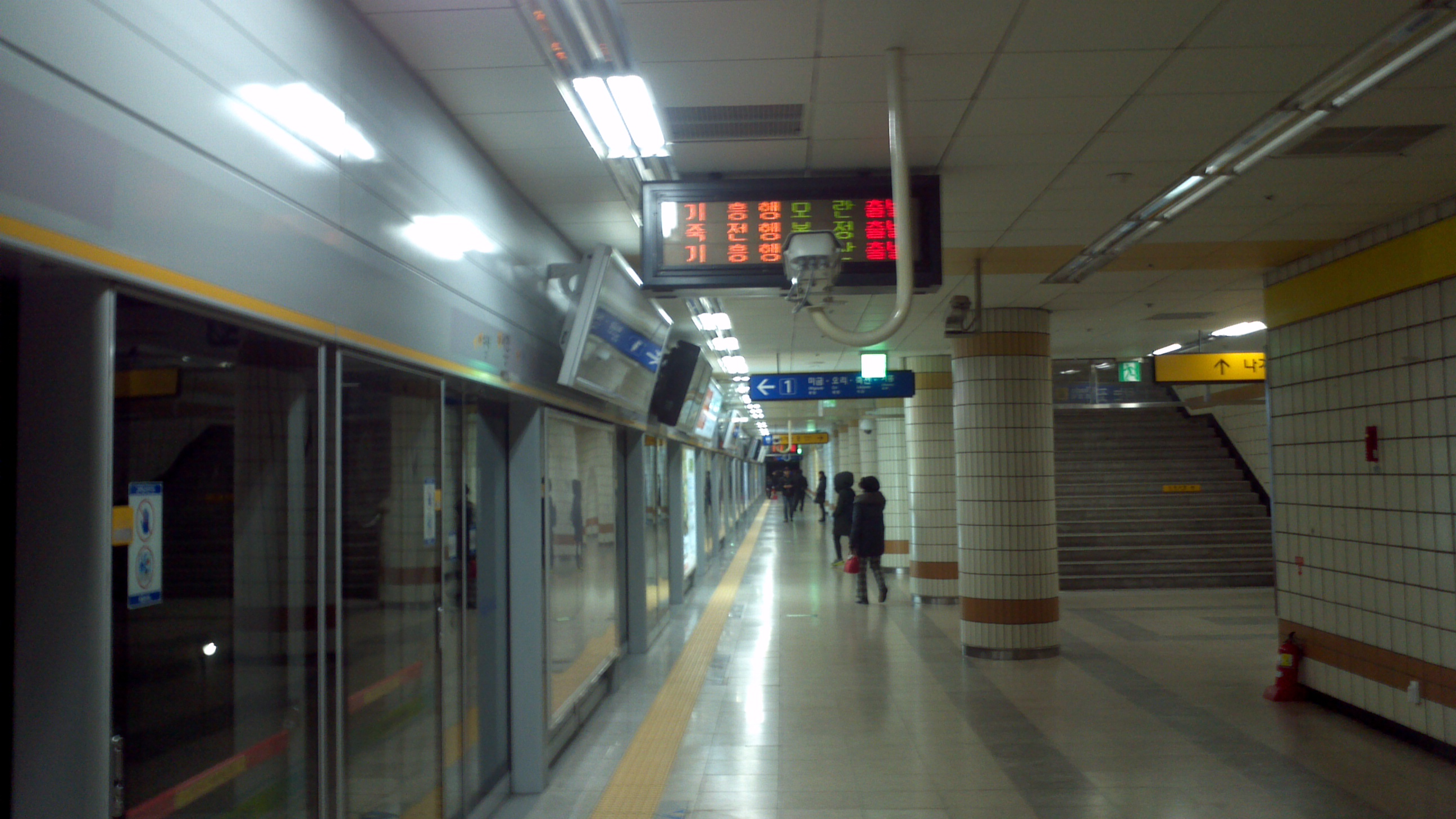
- Station platform

Korean name
- Hangul: 서현역
- Hanja: 書峴驛
- Revised Romanization: Seohyeonnyeok
- McCune–Reischauer: Sŏhyŏnnyŏk

General information
- Location: 263 Seohyeon-dong, Bundang-gu, Seongnam-si, Gyeonggi-do
- Coordinates: 37°23′06.42″N 127°07′23.86″E
- Operator: Korail
- Line: Suin–Bundang Line
- Platforms: 2
- Tracks: 2

Construction
- Structure type: Underground

Key dates
- September 1, 1994: Suin–Bundang Line opened
Location

Seohyeon Station is a subway station on the Suin–Bundang Line in Gyeonggi-do, South Korea. The line connects to Seoul. The area around this station is popular among young people, with many bars, restaurants, movie theaters, hagwon, offices, etc. AK Plaza (previously Samsung Plaza) and Bundang Jesaeng Hospital are also in this area.

There are benches on the platforms, but there are no benches outside the turnstiles.

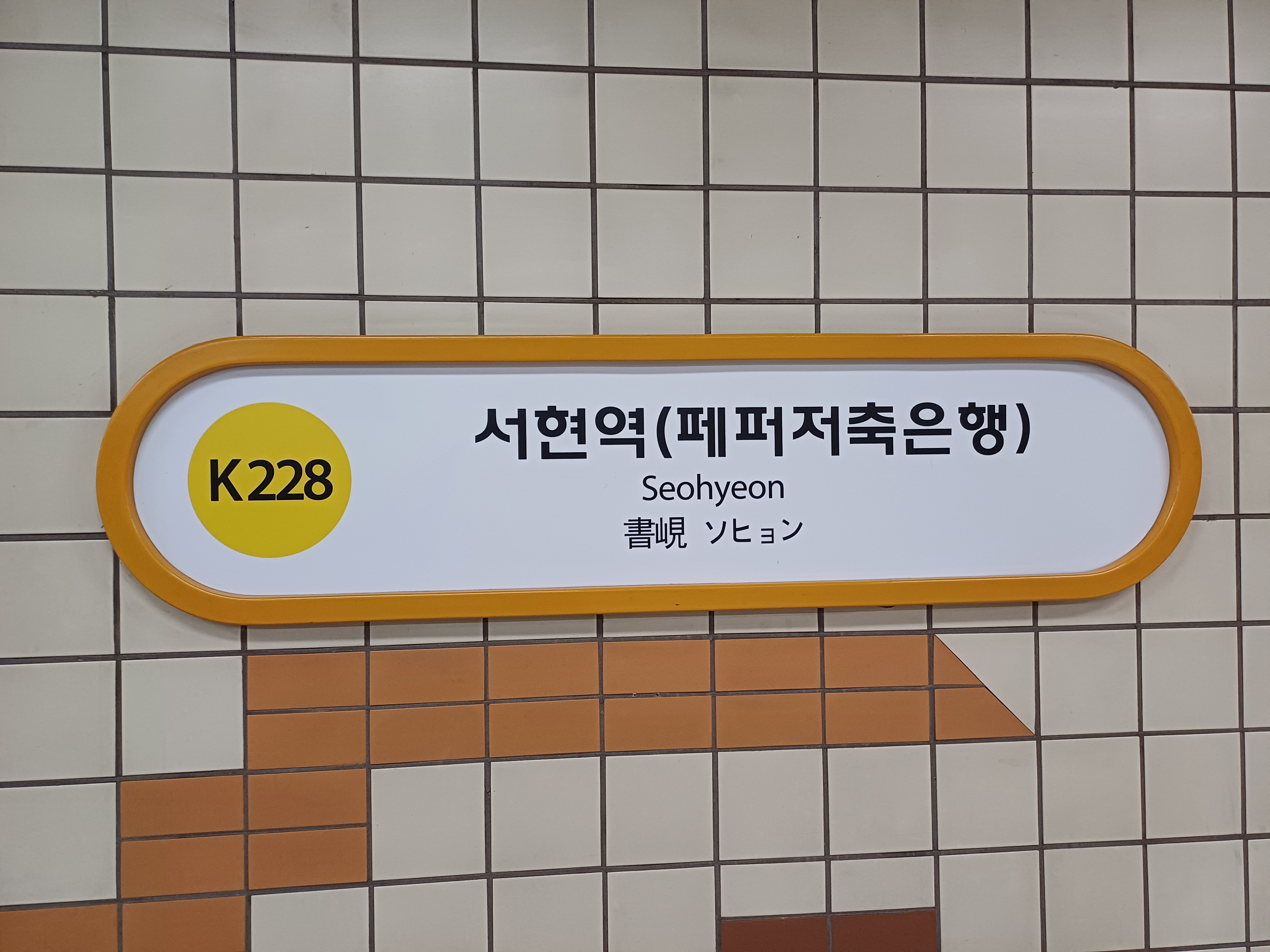
Station nameplate

Preceding station	Seoul Metropolitan Subway	Following station
Imae towards Cheongnyangni	Suin–Bundang Line	Sunae towards Incheon
