= Imae-dong =

Neighborhood in Seongnam, South Korea

Coordinates: 37°24′N 127°08′E

- Hangul: 이매동
- Hanja: 二梅洞
- RR: Imae-dong
- MR: Imae-dong

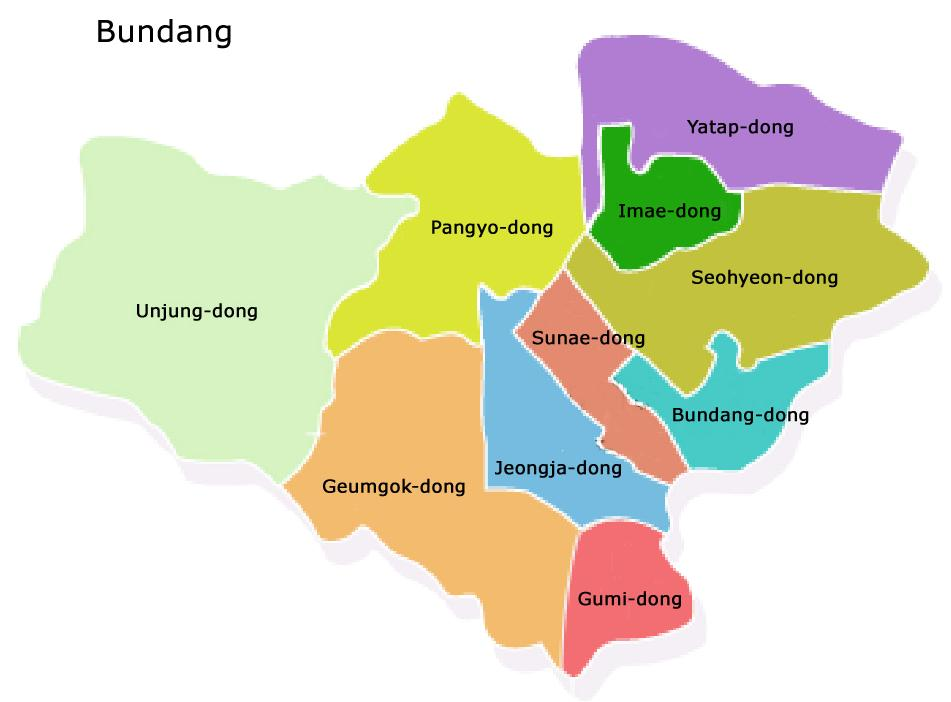
Administrative map of Bundang-gu; Imae-dong is dark green.

Imae-dong (Korean: 이매동) is a dong in Bundang District, Seongnam, Gyeonggi Province. It is officially divided into Imae-1-dong and Imae-2-dong. It shares its name with a station on the Bundang Line. As of January 1, 2024, it has a population of 24,842, spanning 9,000 households. It comprises 2.90km^{2} or 2.05% of Bundang-gu.

== Name ==
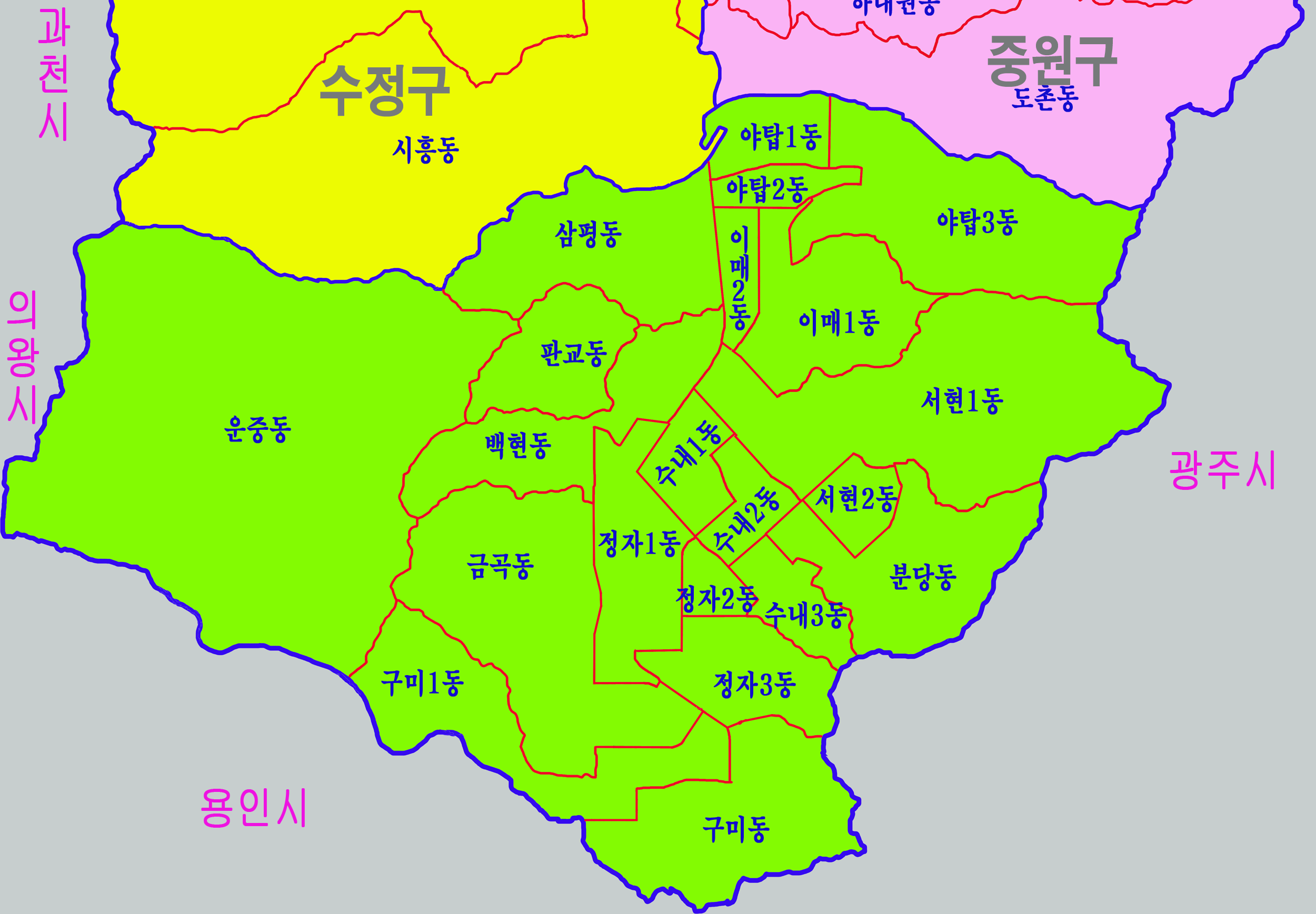
Korean administrative map of Bundang-gu, with Imae-dong split into Imae-1-dong and Imae-2-dong.

There are two theories on the etymology of Imae-dong, the first of which combines a local name for the fields along the river Tancheon, Imusudeul (이무술들), and the shape of the village which corresponds to a geomatic terminology, 'plum blossom falling to the ground' (매화낙지형; 梅花落地形), with mae (梅) being the hanja for plum blossom; the second is that there are two mountains peaks named Maejibong (매지봉; 梅址峰), thus Imae literally means 'two Maes'.

A third etymology of Imae-dong comes from a local legend, which holds that the area was previously known as Imusul (이무술), and its residents, on one summer day, caught and killed a large fish that was revealed to be a snake, which was destined to ascend towards heaven. They were warned through a dream that they will be cursed, and was haunted by the nightly cries of the snake's mate, thus they all held a ritual for it, of which it was satisfied, and told villagers through their dreams that their daily lives would be unimpacted. The next day, they found out that two plum trees had grown on the site of the ritual, thus the name Imae.

== Education ==
Imae-dong's educational institutions are as follows:

=== Imae-1-dong ===
- Anmal Elementary School [ko] (안말초등학교; 안말初等學校)
- Imae Elementary School [ko] (이매초등학교; 二梅初等學校)
- Imae Middle School [ko] (이매중학교; 二梅中學校)
- Songlim Middle School [ko] (송림중학교; 松林中學校)
- Songlim High School [ko] (송림고등학교; 松林高等學校)
- Dolma High School [ko] (돌마고등학교; 突馬高等學校)

=== Imae-2-dong ===
- Maesong Elementary School [ko] (매송초등학교; 梅松初等學校)
- Maesong Middle School [ko] (매송중학교; 梅松中學校)
- Imae High School [ko] (이매고등학교; 二梅高等學校)

== Institutions ==
Imae-dong is home to the following institutions:

- Bundang Fire Station
- Seongnam Chamber of Commerce and Industry
