= Sunae-dong =

Neighborhood in Seongnam, South Korea

- Hangul: 수내동
- Hanja: 藪內洞
- RR: Sunae-dong
- MR: Sunae-dong

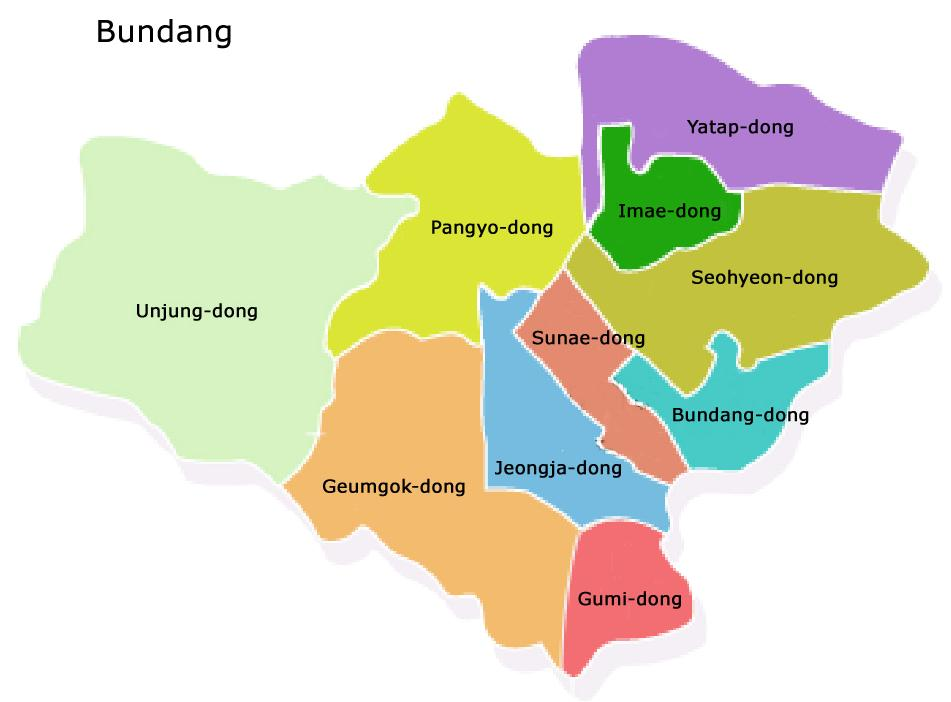
Administrative map of Bundang-gu; Sunae-dong is in the center.

Sunae-dong (Korean: 수내동) is a dong in Bundang-gu in the city of Seongnam, Gyeonggi Province, South Korea. It is officially divided into Sunae-1-dong, Sunae-2-dong and Sunae-3-dong. As of 2024, the population of these three dongs combined is 41,610, spanning 16,017 households. They consists of 2.92km^{2} or 2.79% of Bundang-gu. Sunae means 'within the forest', which originally refers to Budangcheon, a tributary of Tancheon. Before October 2000, Sunae-1-dong and Sunae-2-dong is known as Chorim-dong (초림동; 草林洞) and Naejeong-dong (내정동; 内亭洞) respectively.

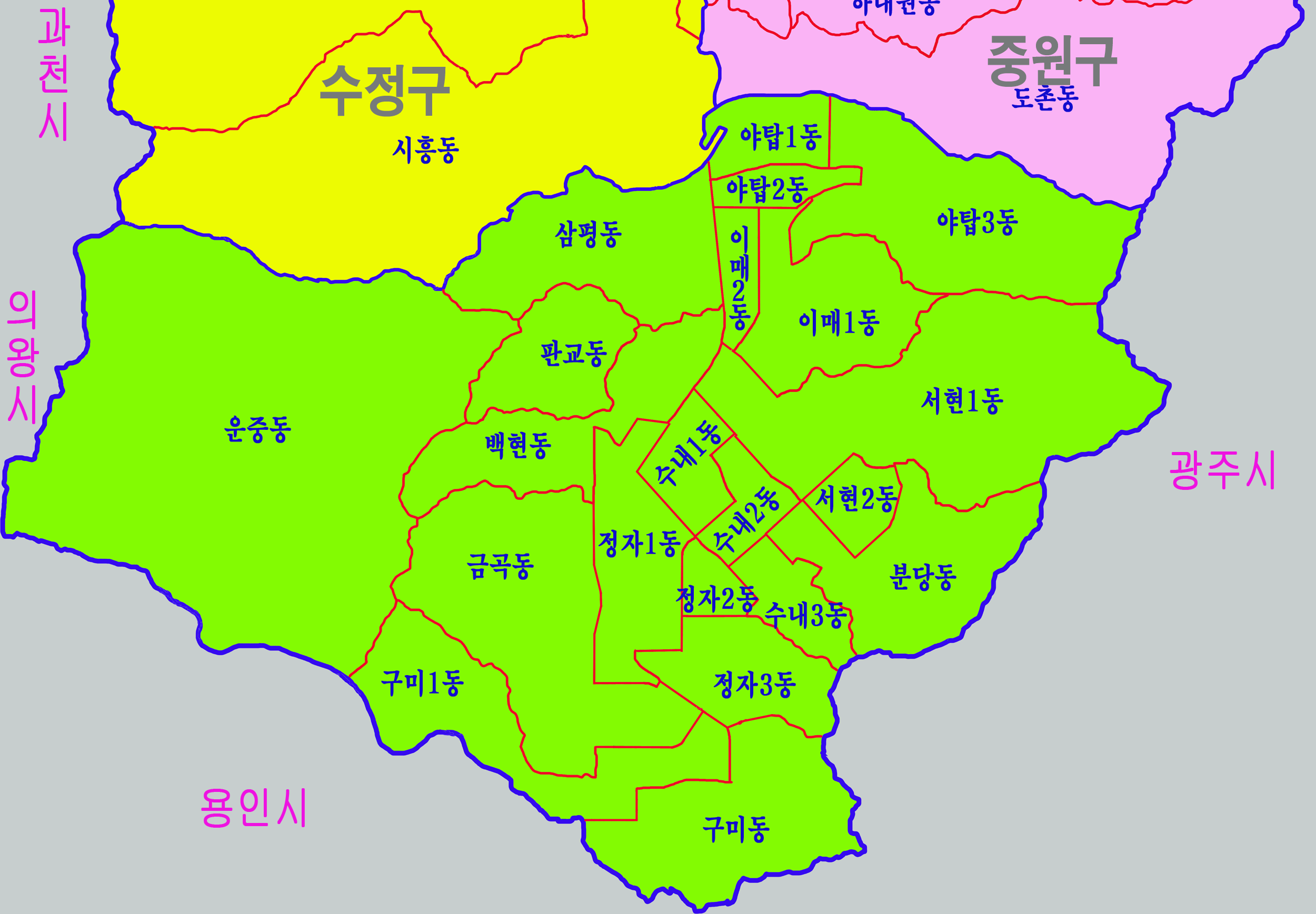
Korean administrative map of Bundang-gu with Sunae-dong split into Sunae-1-dong, Sunae-2-dong, and Sunae-3-dong.

It is served by Sunae Station on the Bundang Line.

== Education ==
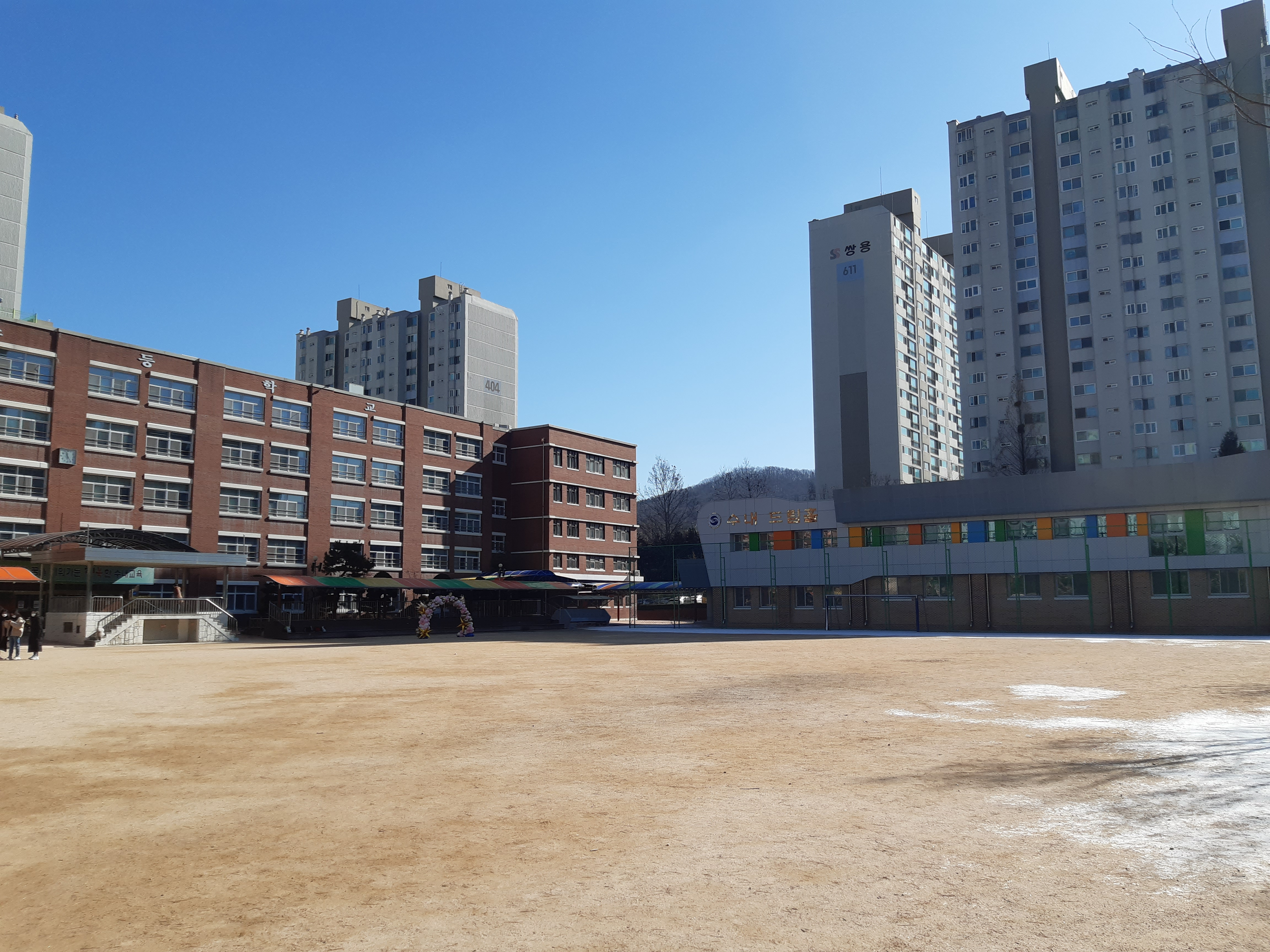
Sunae Elementary School, a public elementary school in Sunae-dong.

Educational institutions in Sunae-dong is as follows:

=== Sunae-1-dong ===
- Chorim Elementary School [ko] (초림초등학교; 草林初等學校)
- Bundang High School [ko] (분당고등학교; 盆唐高等學校)

=== Sunae-2-dong ===
- Naejeong Elementary School [ko] (내정초등학교; 內亭初等學校)
- Naejeong Middle School [ko] (내정중학교; 內亭中學校)

=== Sunae-3-dong ===
- Sunae Elementary School [ko] (수내초등학교; 藪內初等學校)
- Saetbyeol Middle School [ko] (샛별중학교; 샛별中學校)
- Sunae Middle School [ko] (수내중학교; 藪內中學校)
- Sunae High School [ko] (수내고등학교; 藪內高等學校)

== Places of Interest ==
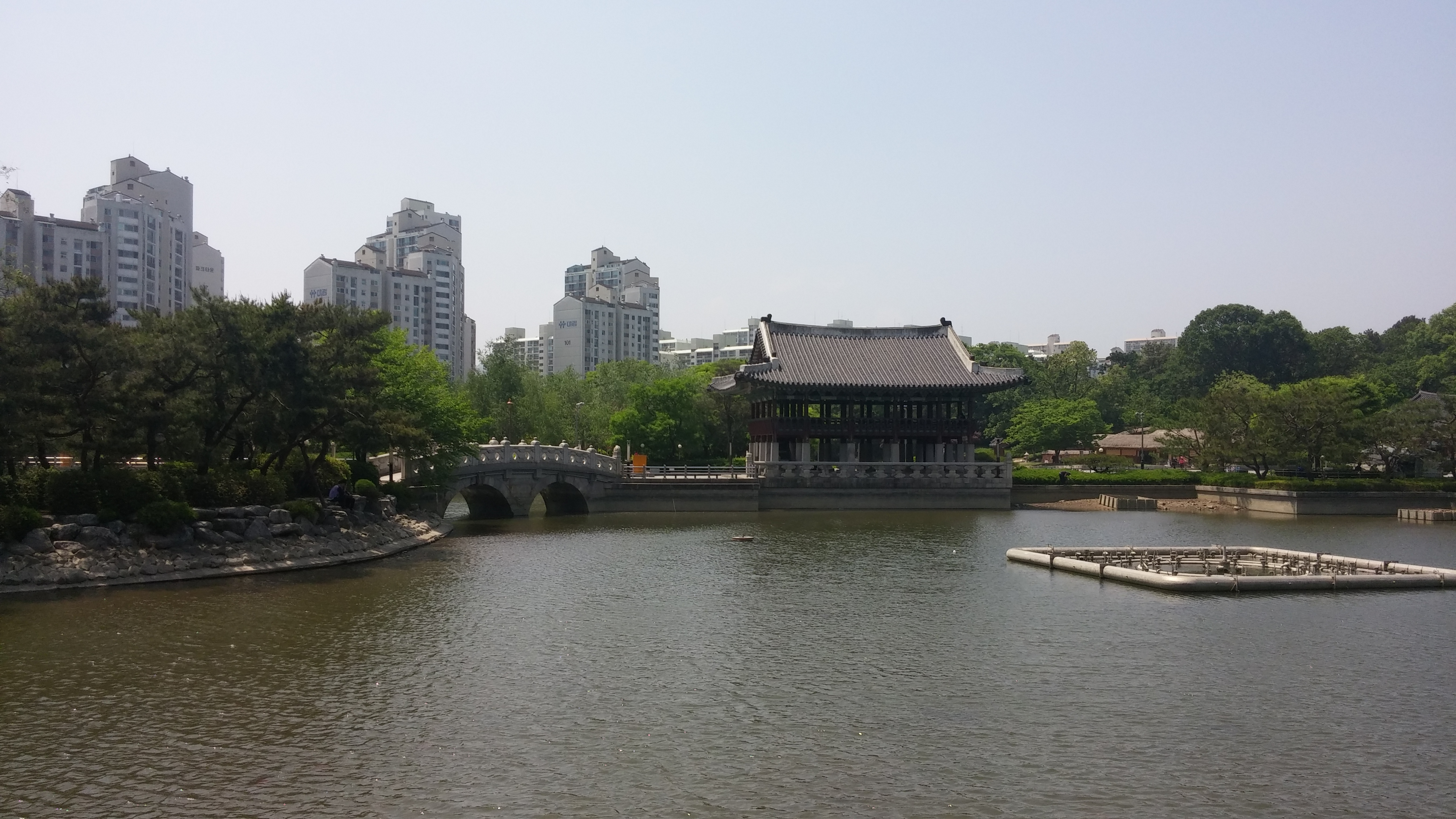
Seongnam Central Park

Places of interest in Sunae-dong include:

- Seongnam Central Park (성남중앙공원; 城南中央公園), also known as Bundang Central Park, located at the foot of Mt. Yeongjangsan [ko] (영장산; 靈長山) which is 413.5m high. It boasts four badminton courts, a croquet course, an outdoor theatre, a water mill, and Bundang Pond (분당호; 盆唐湖), which is equipped with several fountains.
- Sunae-dong House (수내동가옥; 數內洞家屋), one of the residences of the Hansan Lee clan (한산이씨; 韓山李氏) [ko], built during the late 19th century in the Joseon period, located within the park. It is designated as Gyeonggi Province Cultural Treasure No. 78 on December 29, 1989.
- Hansan Lee Clan Burial Mound [ko] (한산이씨묘역; 韓山李氏墓域), the resting place of prominent members of the Hansan Lee clan, spanning 87,000 pyeong. Among them lay civil servants and military officers. It is designated as Gyeonggi Province Cultural Treasure No. 116 on December 29, 1989.

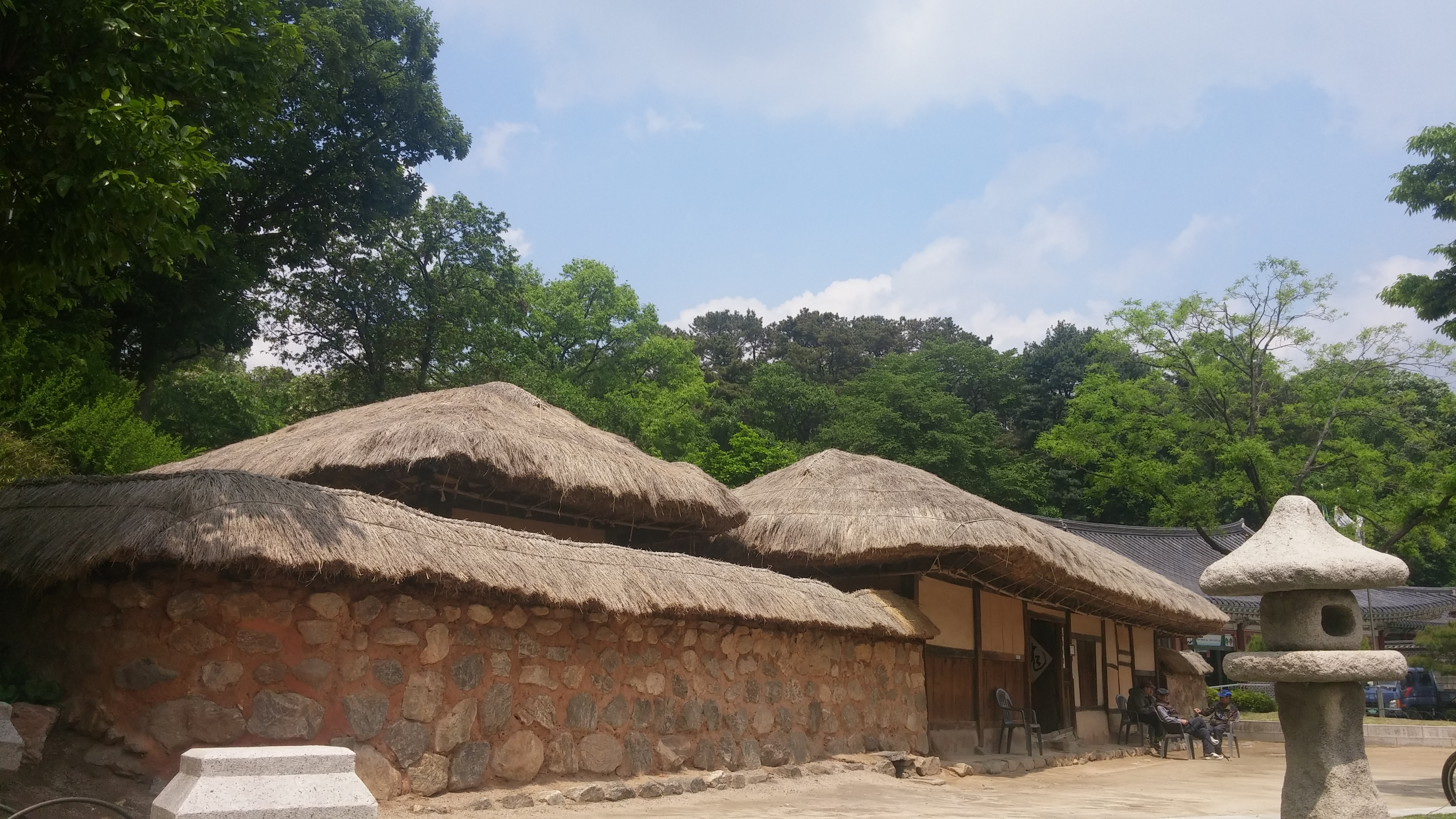
Sunae-dong House

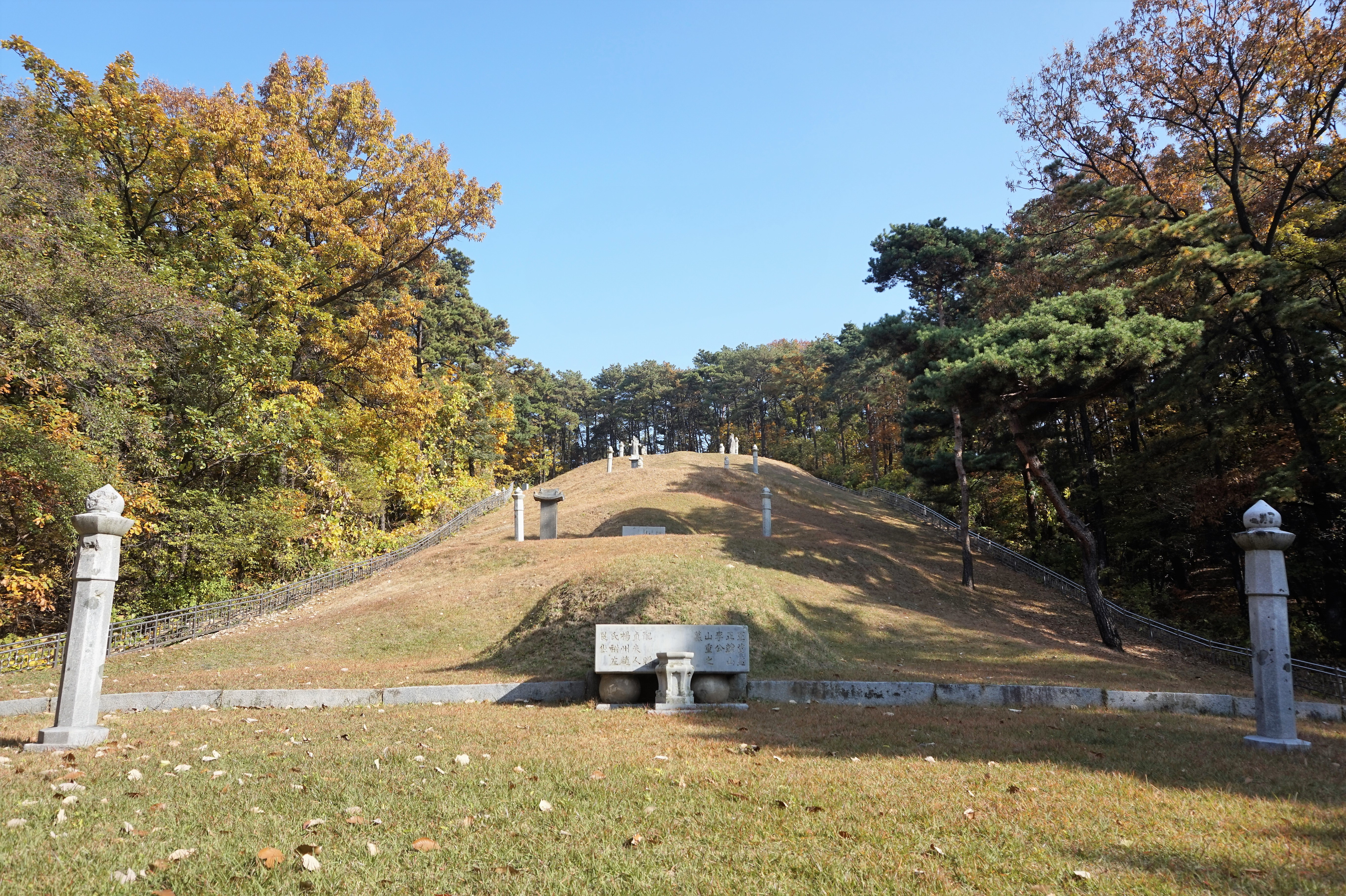
Hansan Lee Clan Burial Mound
