= Yuldong Park =

Park in Bundang, Seongnam, South Korea

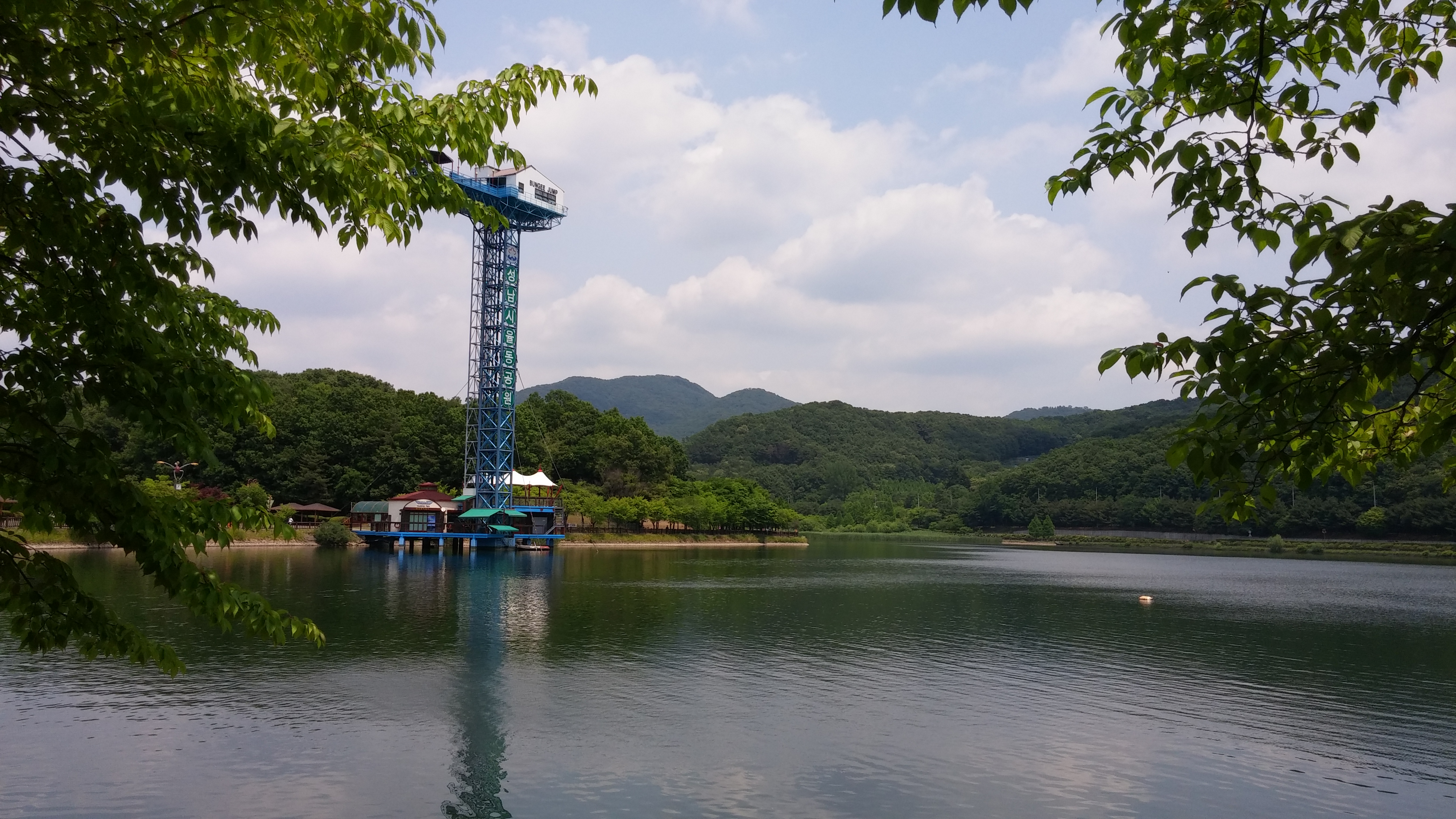
- The lake in the center of the park, with bungee tower visible (2015)
- Interactive map of Yuldong Park
- Location: Yul-dong, Bundang-gu, Seongnam, South Korea.
- Coordinates: 37°22′30″N 127°09′00″E
- Area: 263.7316 hectares (651.695 acres)
- Established: September 1, 1999

Korean name
- Hangul: 율동공원
- Hanja: 栗洞公園
- RR: Yuldong gongwon
- MR: Yultong kongwŏn

Yuldong Park (Korean: 율동공원) is a park located at Seohyeon-dong, (Note: The park straddles the border between the beopjeongdong of Yul-dong and Bundang-dong; Yul-dong lies inside the administrative dong of Seohyeon-dong.) Bundang-gu, Seongnam, South Korea.

Yuldong Park opened on September 1, 1999.

Yuldong Park had a bungee jumping tower that was 45 metres (148 ft) tall, but operations stopped around 2018, and it was taken down at the end of 2024.

Surrounding the reservoir, the park is well equipped with a promenade, a theater, flower gardens, children's park, badminton center, artificial rock wall, and many spots for a family picnic. A walking path and bicycle path circle the reservoir. There are many nearby restaurants.

== Gallery ==
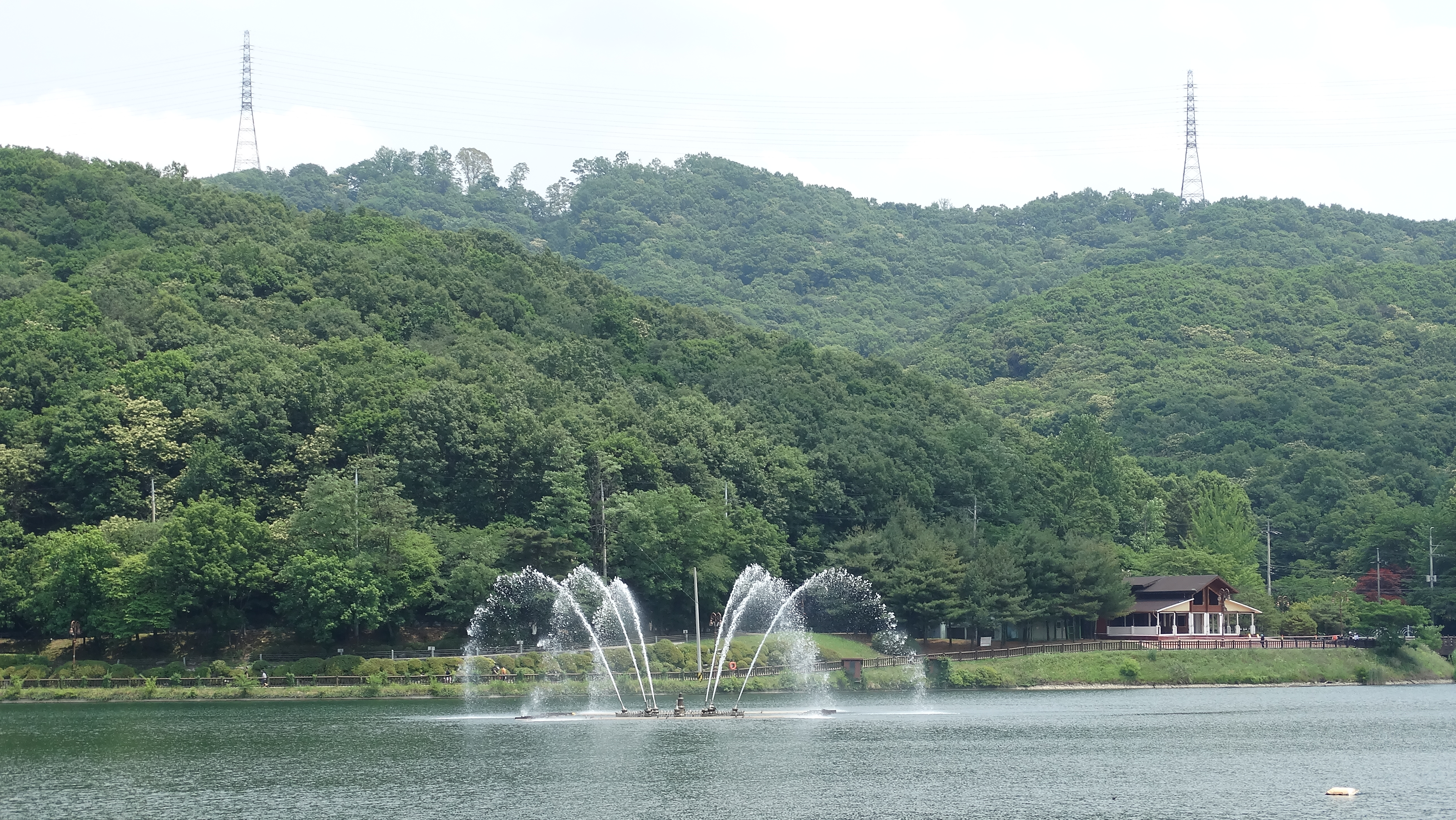
Fountains in the lake (2015)

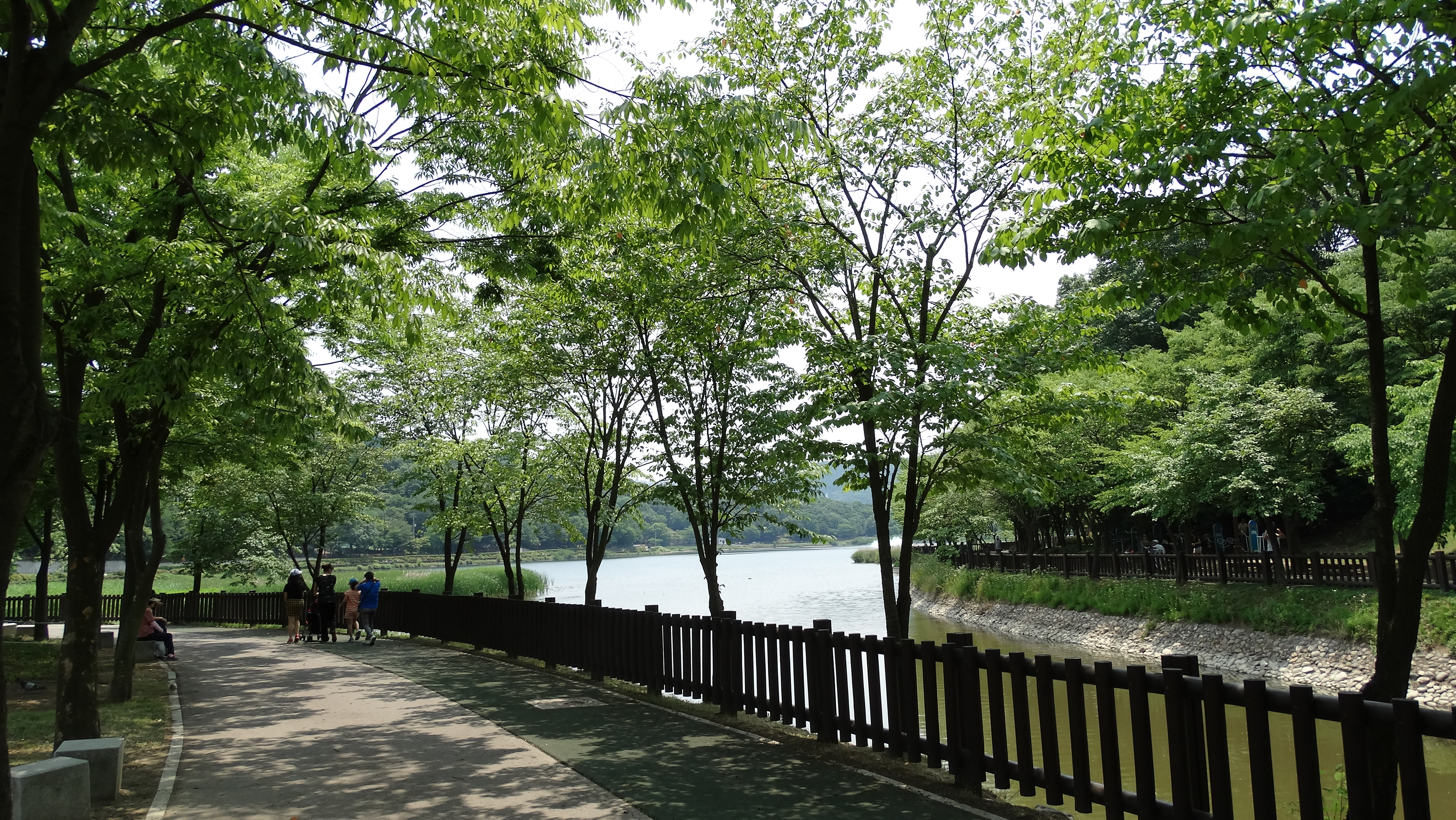
Shaded walking paths (2015)

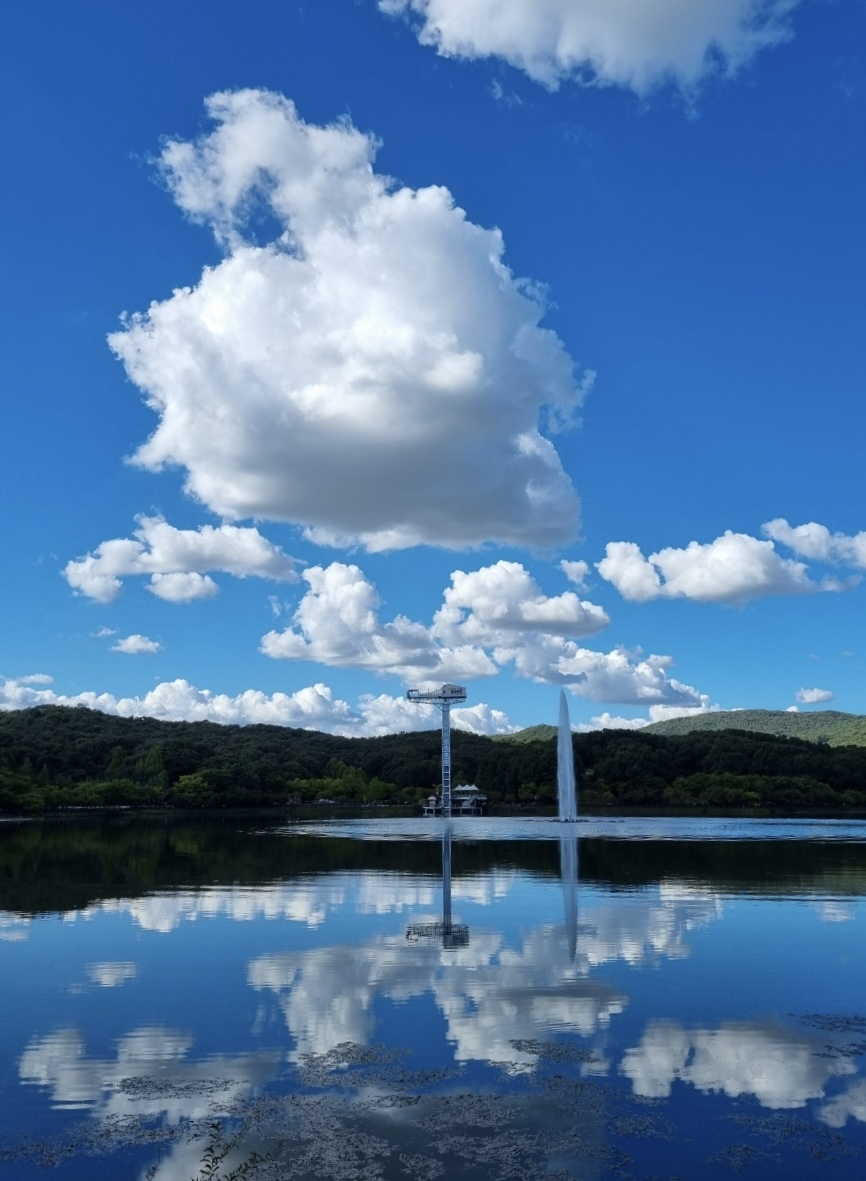
Bungee tower (2021)
