= Bundang Jesaeng Hospital =

Hospital in Seongnam, South Korea

Geography
- Location: Seohyeon-dong, Bundang District, Seongnam, South Korea
- Coordinates: 37.388340°N 127.121769°E

Organisation
- Type: General hospital

History
- Founded: 15 January 1995

Bundang Jesaeng Hospital (Korean: 분당제생병원), also known as Daejin Medical Center, is a general hospital located in Seohyeon-dong, Bundang District, Seongnam, South Korea. It is one of the Daejin Medical Centers and was built on 15 January 1995 by Daejin Medical Foundation which is owned by Daesunjinrihoe.

== Trivia ==
A 2006 SBS TV series, Alone in Love took shots in this hospital.

== See also ==
- Daesunjinrihoe
