= St. John's Church, Seongnam =

St. John's Catholic Church
- 성요한성당
- St. John's Catholic Church
- 37°22′9″N 127°8′53″E
- Location: Seongnam
- Country: South Korea
- Denomination: Catholic Church
- Sui iuris church: Latin Church
- Website: www.stjohn.kr

History
- Status: Parish church
- Founded: 7 January 1993

Administration
- Diocese: Suwon

- St. John's Church
- Hangul: 성요한성당
- Hanja: 聖요한聖堂
- Revised Romanization: Seong Yohan Seongdang
- McCune–Reischauer: Sŏng Yohan Sŏngdang

St. John's Catholic Church (Korean: 성요한성당), also known as Bundang Church (Korean: 분당성당), is parish of the Roman Catholic Church located in the Bundang district of Seongnam, Gyeonggi Province, South Korea. The parish was established January 7, 1993 within the Diocese of Suwon. The church was dedicated to St. John the Apostle on October 3, 2003.

== Art and architecture ==
The church was constructed as a mixture of both modern and Gothic-styles. It has a unique spiral stairway (instead of stairs) that features an accompanying spiraling mural which begins with the biblical story of creation in Genesis at the base of the walkway, including the life events of Jesus, His Passion and ending with illustrations from the Acts of the Apostles.

At the foot of the mural walk is placed a replica of Michelangelo's Pietà, made of the same size and material, built by Franco & Cervietti.

The church's organ was custom-made by the Karl Schuke works in Berlin, with 65 stops and 5,124 pipes.

St. John's was one of the churches which hosted the Sistine Choir on its first visit to South Korea in 2017.

== See also ==
- Catholic Church in South Korea
