= Jungwon District =

District of Seongnam, South Korea

Coordinates: 37.430392°N 127.137124°E

- Non-autonomous District
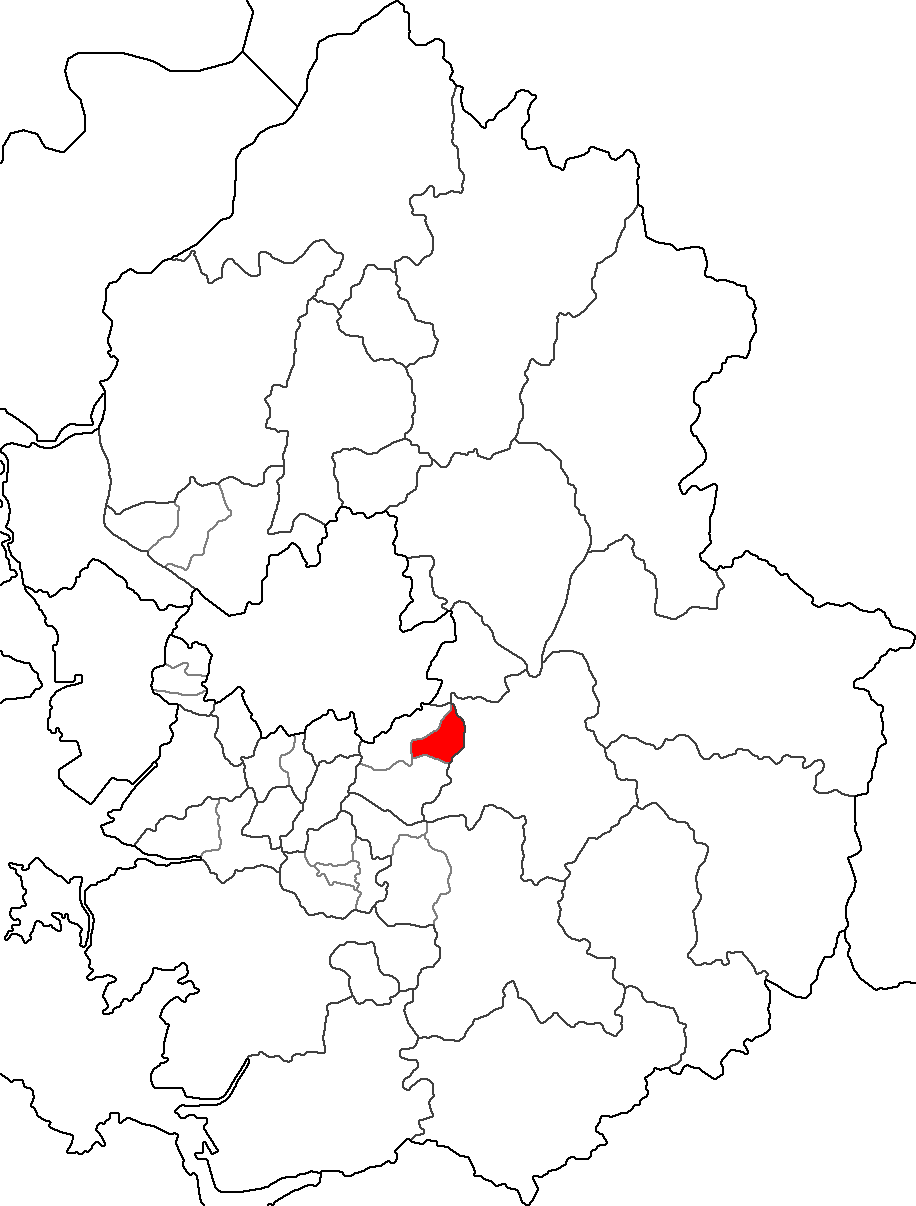
- Location of Jungwon District in Gyeonggi Province
- Country: South Korea
- Region: Sudogwon (Gijeon)
- Province: Gyeonggi
- City: Seongnam
- Administrative divisions: 11 dong

Population (2023)
  - Total: 210,848
  - Dialect: Seoul

Korean name
- Hangul: 중원구
- Hanja: 中院區
- RR: Jungwon-gu
- MR: Chungwŏn-gu

Jungwon District (Korean: 중원구) is a district (gu) in Seongnam, Gyeonggi Province, South Korea. As of 2023, the district had a population of 210,848.
