= Chowol station =

Metro station in Gwangju, South Korea

초월; Chowol
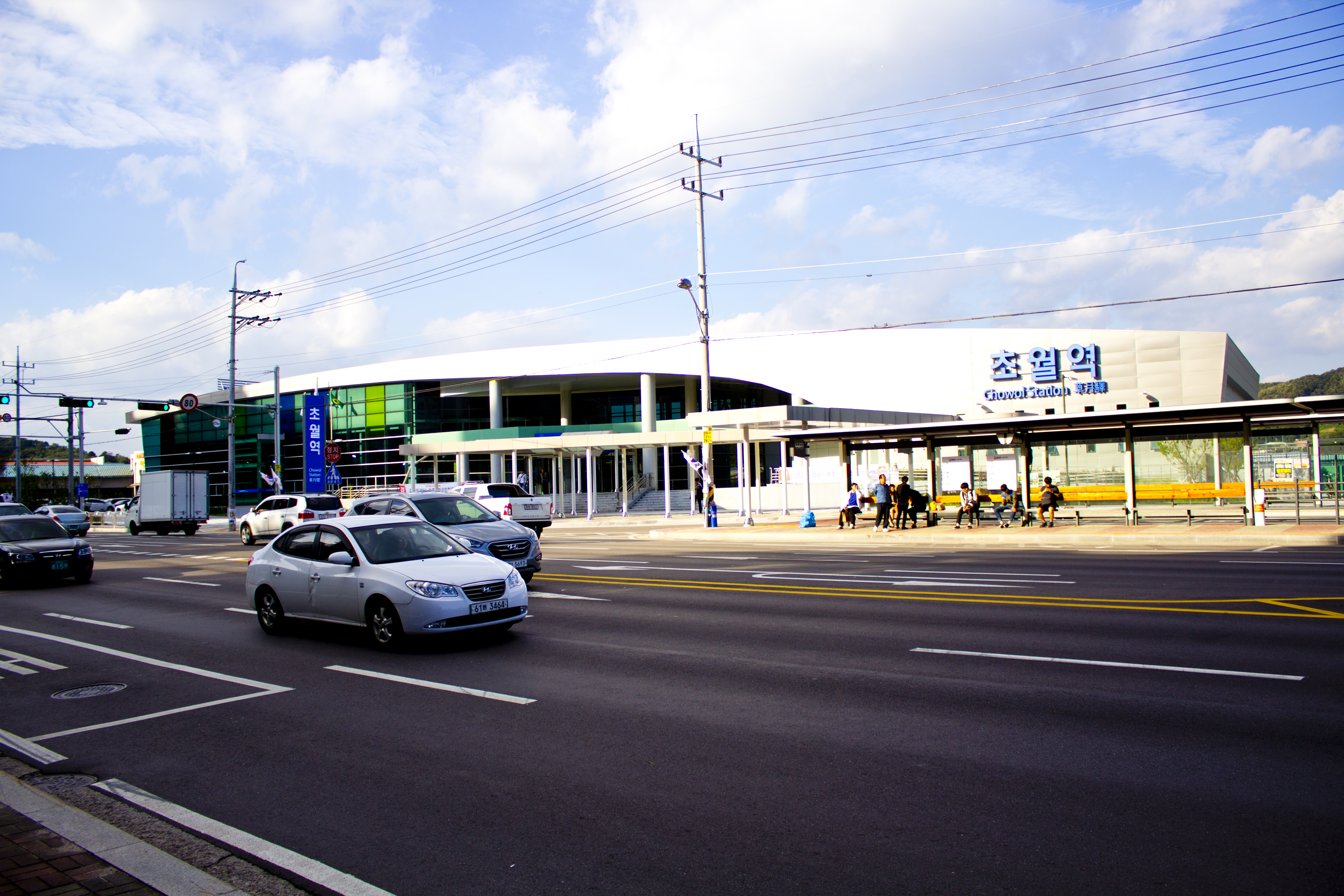

Korean name
- Hangul: 초월역
- Hanja: 草月驛
- Revised Romanization: Chowol yeok
- McCune–Reischauer: Ch'owŏn yŏk

General information
- Location: Chowol-eup, Gwangju, Gyeonggi
- Coordinates: 37°22′24″N 127°18′00″E
- Operated by: Korail
- Line: Gyeonggang Line
- Platforms: 2
- Tracks: 2

Construction
- Structure type: Underground

History
- Opened: September 24, 2016

Services
Preceding station	Seoul Metropolitan Subway	Following station
Gyeonggi Gwangju towards Pangyo	Gyeonggang Line	Gonjiam towards Yeoju
Location

Chowol station (Korean: 초월역) is a railway station on Gyeonggang Line of the Seoul Metropolitan Subway in Chowol-eup, Gwangju, Gyeonggi, South Korea.

== Station layout ==
L2; Platforms	Side platform, doors will open on the left
L2; Platforms	Southbound	Gyeonggang Line toward Yeoju (Gonjiam)→
L2; Platforms	Northbound	← Gyeonggang Line toward Pangyo (Gyeonggi Gwangju)
L2; Platforms	Side platform, doors will open on the left

L1; Concourse	Lobby	Customer Service, Shops, Vending machines, ATMs

G	Street level	Exit
