= Samdong station =

Metro station in Gwangju, South Korea

삼동; Samdong
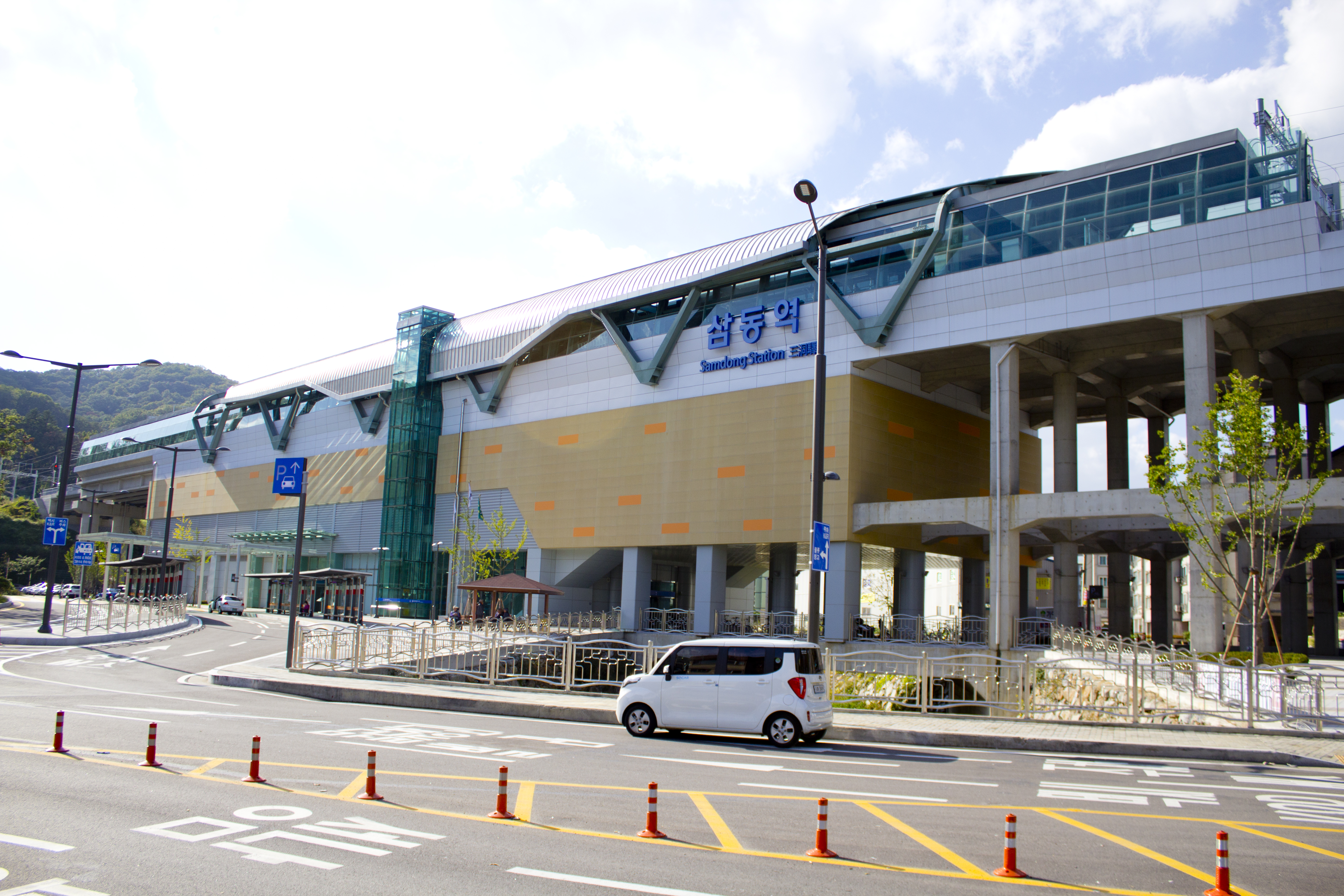
- Samdong station

Korean name
- Hangul: 삼동역
- Hanja: 三洞驛
- Revised Romanization: Samdong yeok
- McCune–Reischauer: Samtong yŏk

General information
- Location: Jungdae-dong, Gwangju, Gyeonggi
- Coordinates: 37°24′31″N 127°12′13″E
- Operator: Korail
- Line: Gyeonggang Line
- Platforms: 2
- Tracks: 2

History
- Opened: September 24, 2016

Services
Preceding station	Seoul Metropolitan Subway	Following station
Imae towards Pangyo	Gyeonggang Line	Gyeonggi Gwangju towards Yeoju
Location

Samdong station (Korean: 삼동역; Hanja: 三洞驛) is a railway station on Gyeonggang Line of the Seoul Metropolitan Subway. It is located at Jungdae-dong, Gwangju, Gyeonggi, South Korea.

== Station layout ==
L2; Platforms	Side platform, doors will open on the left
L2; Platforms	Southbound	Gyeonggang Line toward Yeoju (Gyeonggi Gwangju)→
L2; Platforms	Northbound	← Gyeonggang Line toward Pangyo (Imae)
L2; Platforms	Side platform, doors will open on the left

L1; Concourse	Lobby	Customer Service, Shops, Vending machines, ATMs

G	Street level	Exit

== Gallery ==
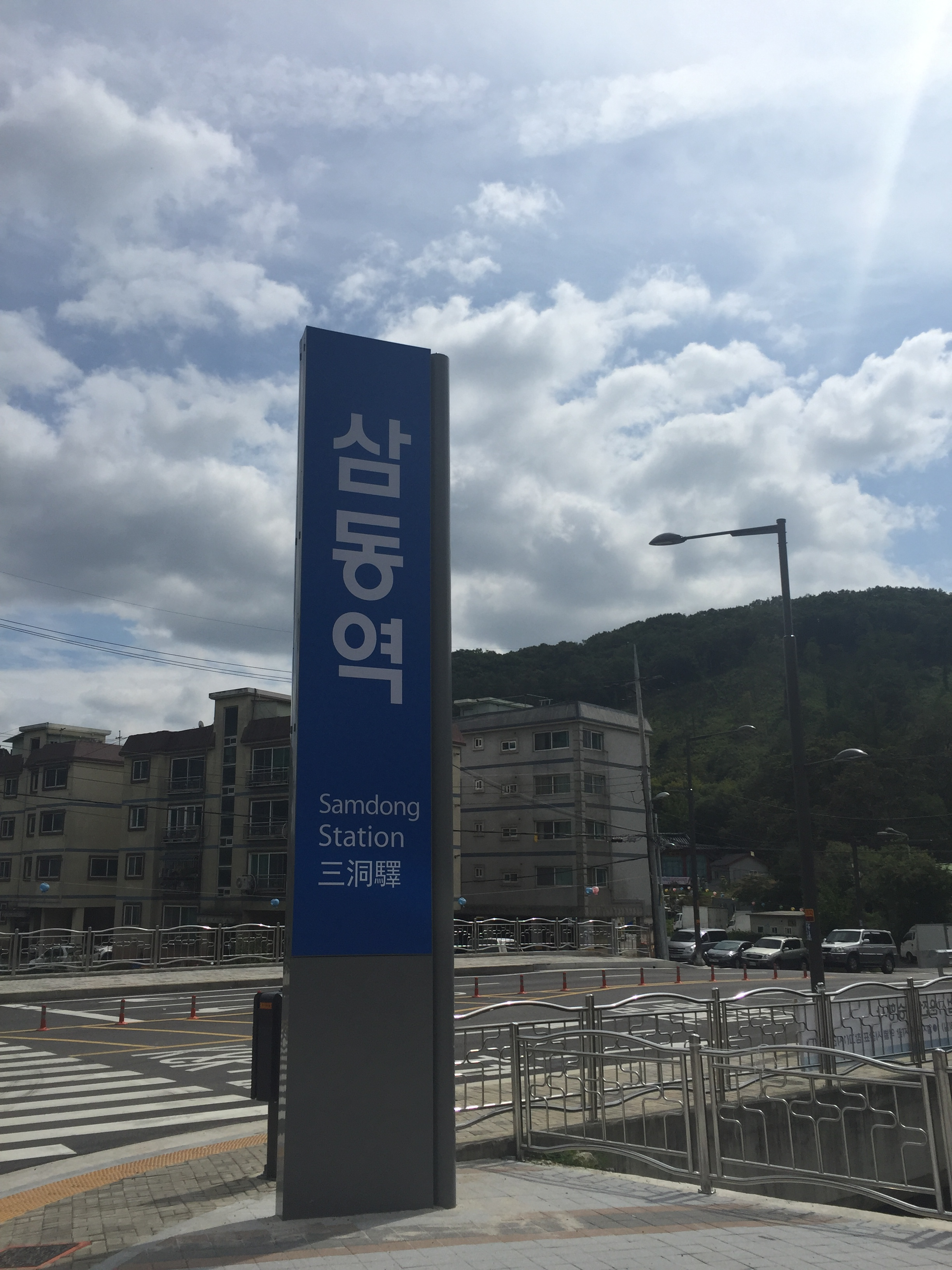
Samdong station outside station name plate.

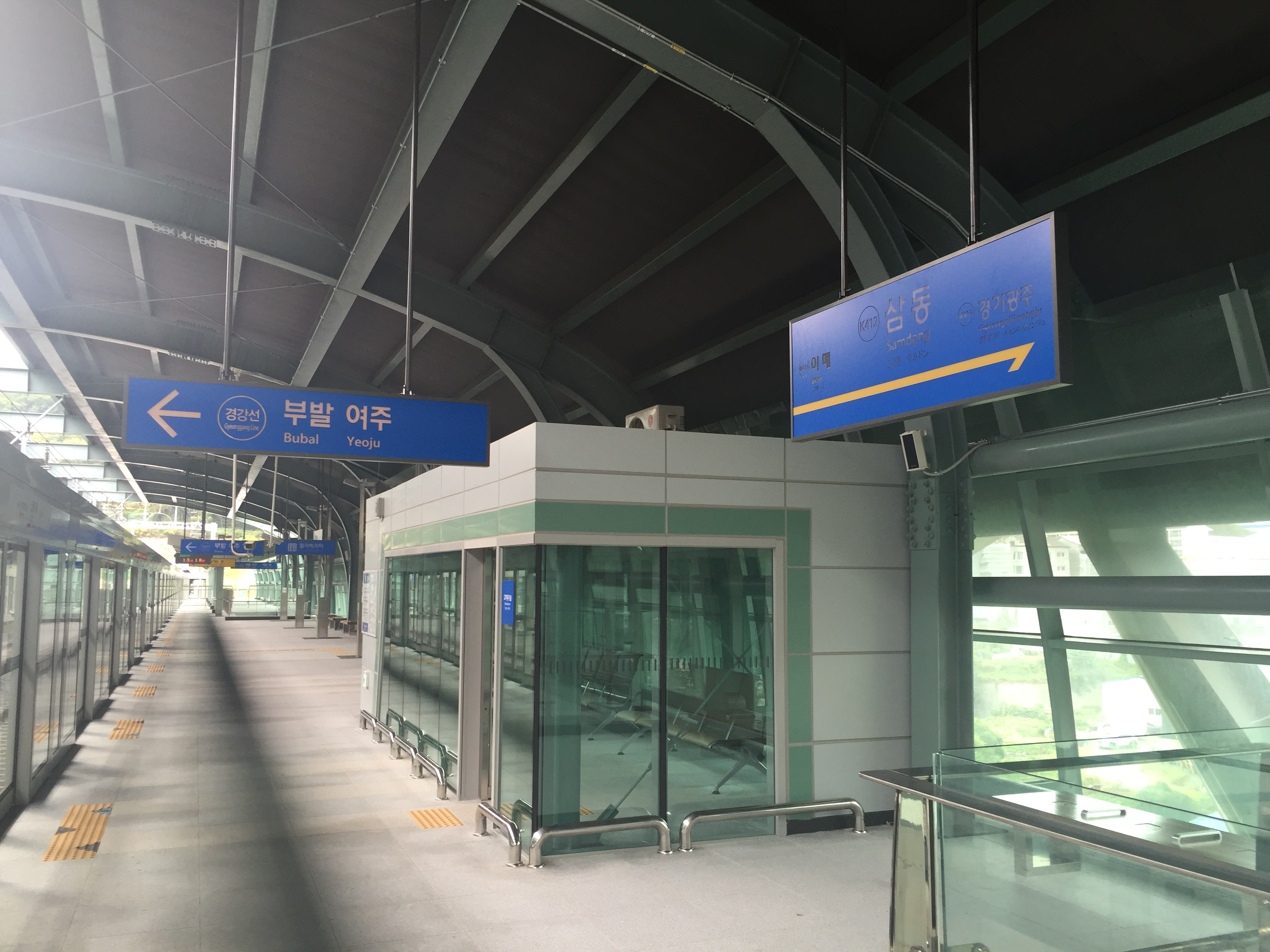
Platform
