= Imae station =

Metro station in Seongnam, South Korea

Coordinates: 37°23′44.63″N 127°07′42.12″E

이매 (성남아트센터); Imae (Seongnam Arts Center)
이매; Imae
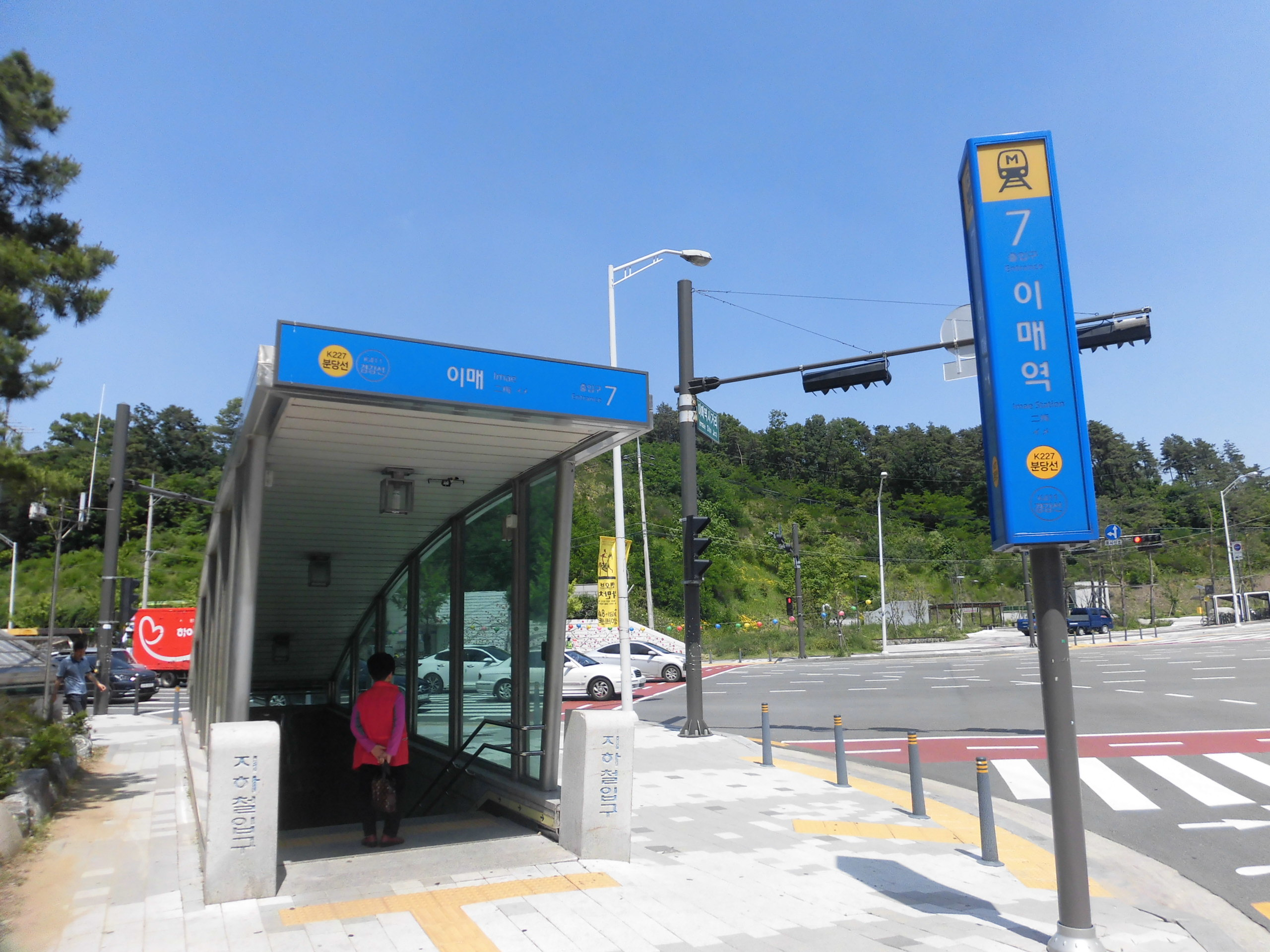
- Imae Station

Korean name
- Hangul: 이매역
- Hanja: 二梅驛
- Revised Romanization: Imae-yeok
- McCune–Reischauer: Imae-yŏk

General information
- Location: 129-1 Imae-dong, Bundang-gu, Seongnam-si, Gyeonggi-do
- Operator: Korail
- Lines: Suin–Bundang Line; Gyeonggang Line
- Platforms: Suin–Bundang Line: 2 (2 side platforms); Gyeonggang Line: 2 (1 island platform)
- Tracks: 4

Construction
- Structure type: Underground

Key dates
- January 16, 2004: Suin–Bundang Line opened
- September 24, 2016: Gyeonggang Line opened

Services
Preceding station	Seoul Metropolitan Subway	Following station
Yatap towards Cheongnyangni	Suin–Bundang Line	Seohyeon towards Incheon
Seongnam towards Pangyo	Gyeonggang Line	Samdong towards Yeoju
Location

Imae Station (Korean: 이매역) is an infill station on the Suin–Bundang Line of the Seoul Subway. There were originally no plans for this station when the Bundang Line opened in 1994. However, due to local resident demand and the significant distance between Yatap and Seohyeon Stations, construction began in March 2000 and the station was opened on January 16, 2004.

The station became a transfer station for the Gyeonggang Line when operations commenced on September 24, 2016.

== Station Layout ==
=== Suin–Bundang Line ===
↑ Yatap
N/B | | S/B
Seohyeon ↓

Southbound	● Suin–Bundang Line toward Incheon →
Northbound	← ● Suin–Bundang Line toward Cheongnyangni

=== Gyeonggang Line ===
↑ Pangyo
N/B | | S/B
Samdong ↓

Southbound	● Gyeonggang Line toward Yeoju →
Northbound	← ● Gyeonggang Line toward Pangyo

== Vicinity ==
- Exit 1: Seongnam Arts Center
- Exit 2: Seongnam Agricultural Technology Center

== Gallery ==
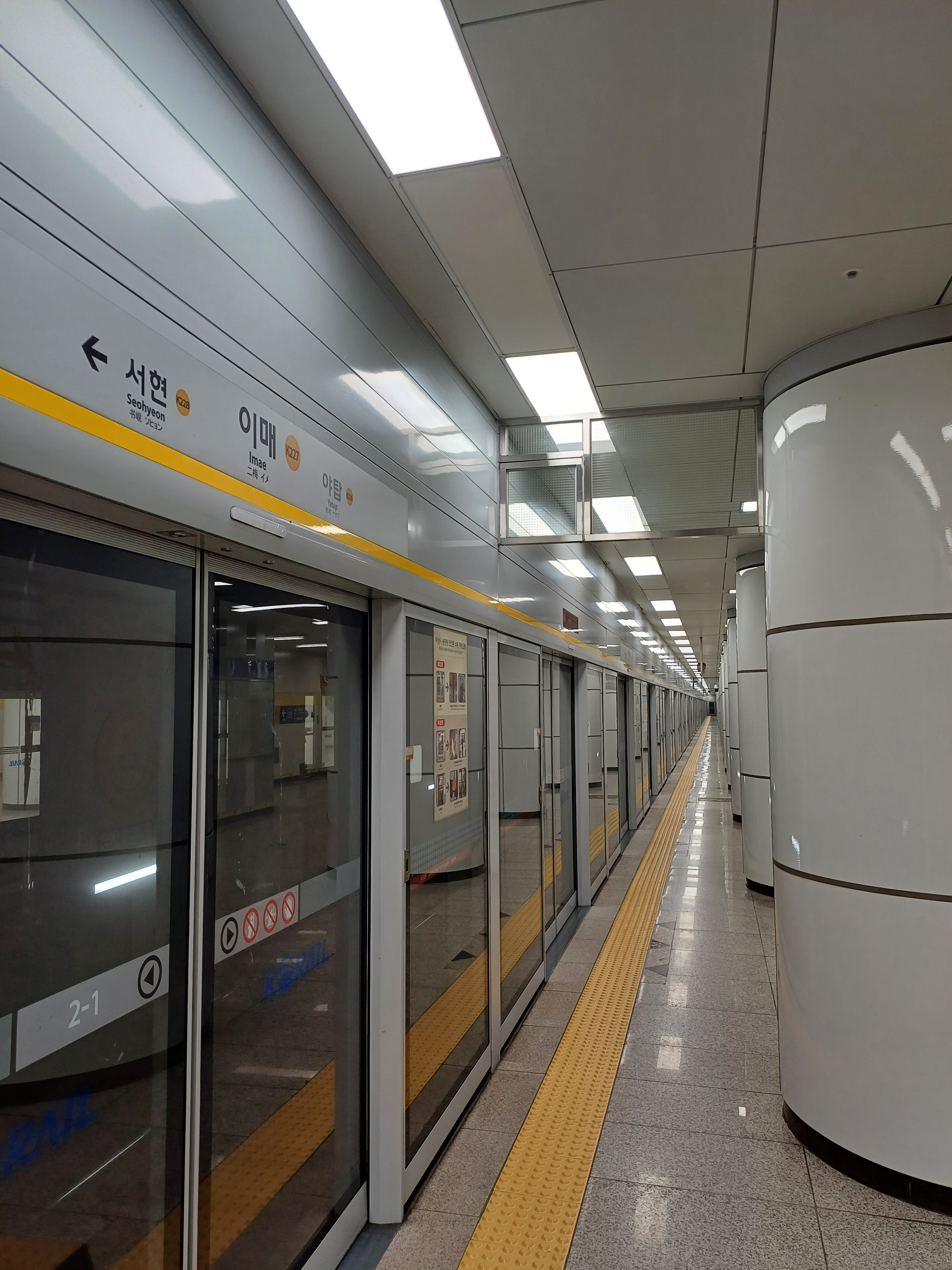
Suin-Bundang Line platform

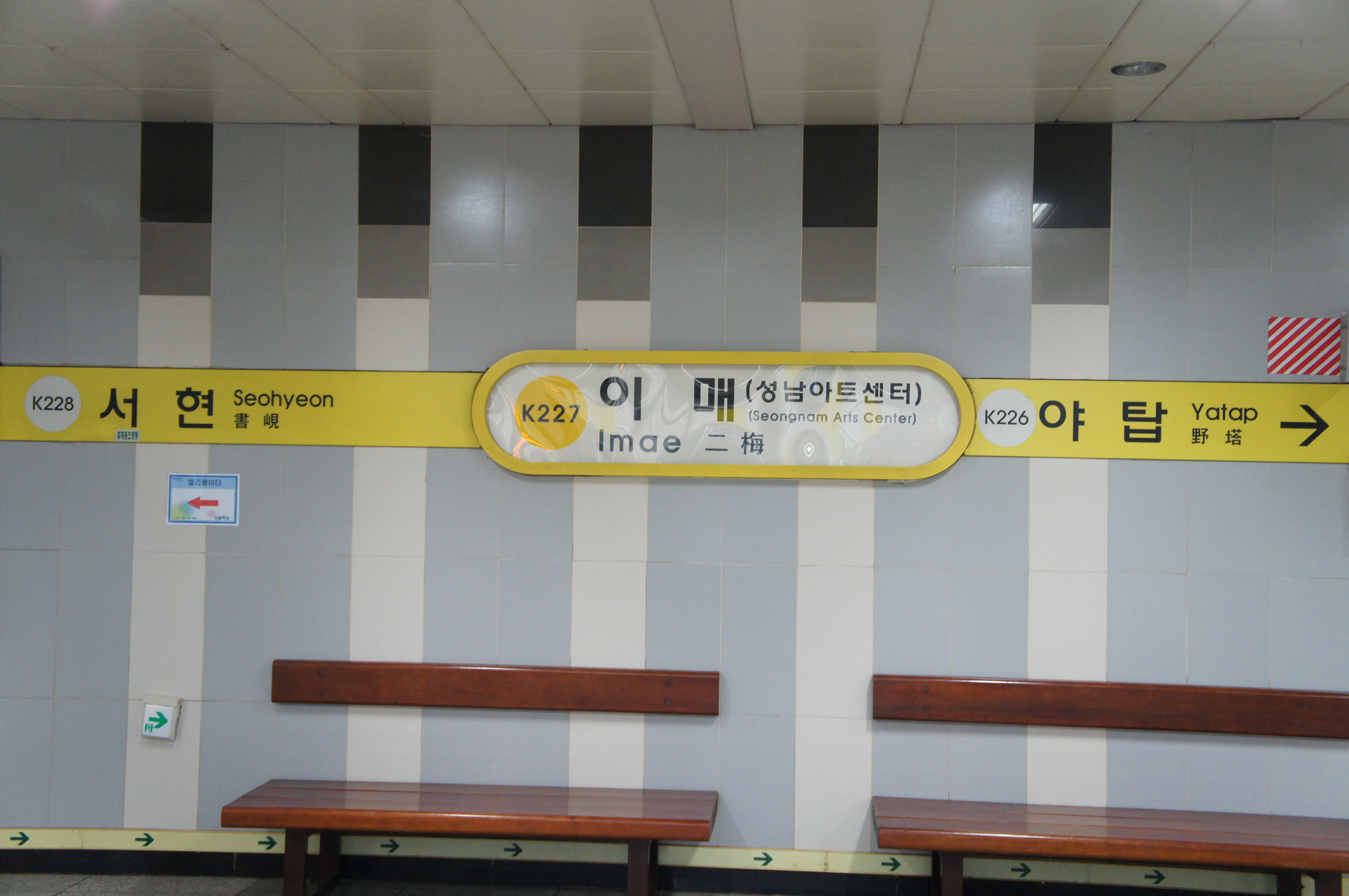
Station sign (Suin–Bundang Line)

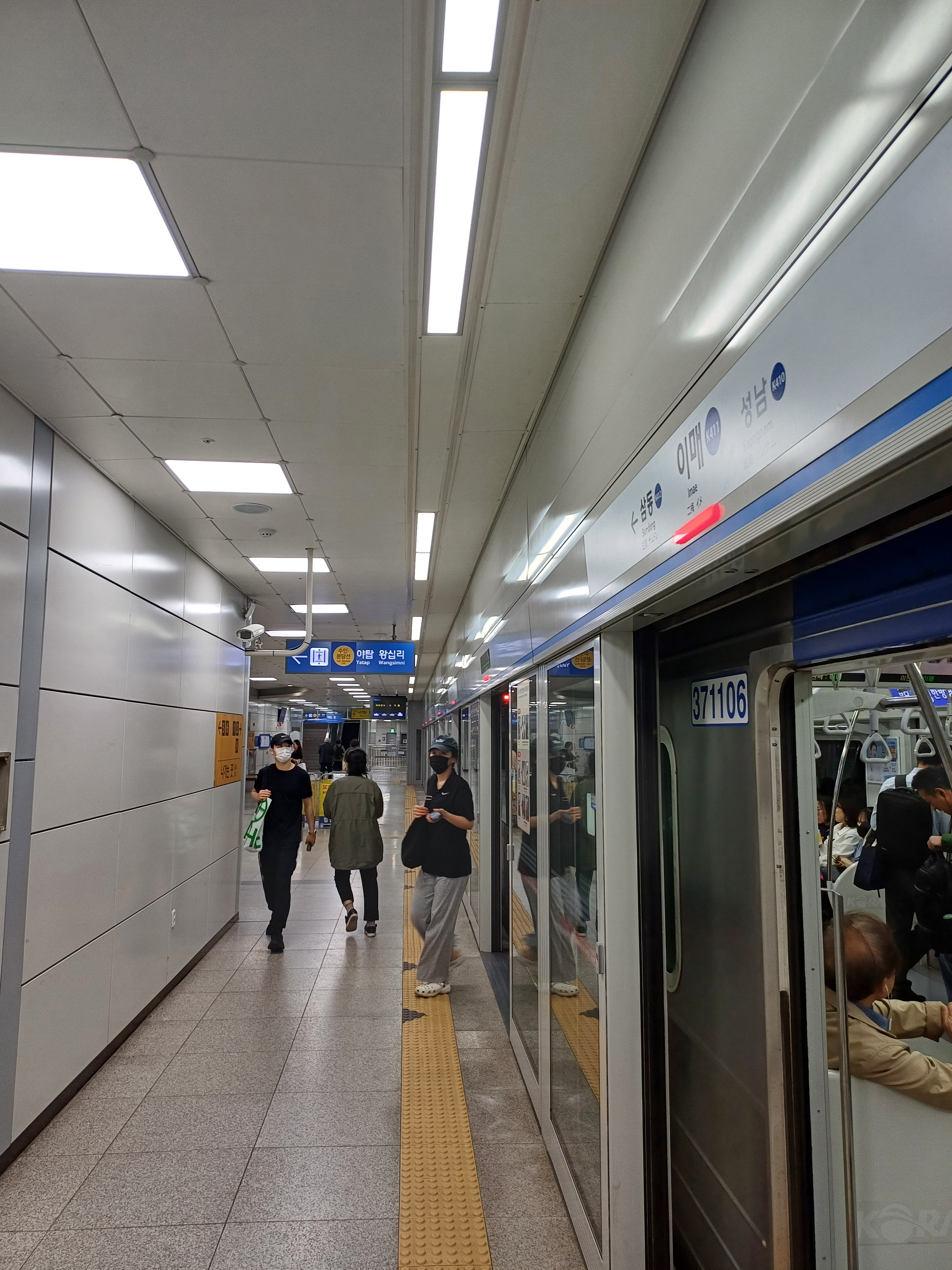
Gyeonggang Line platform

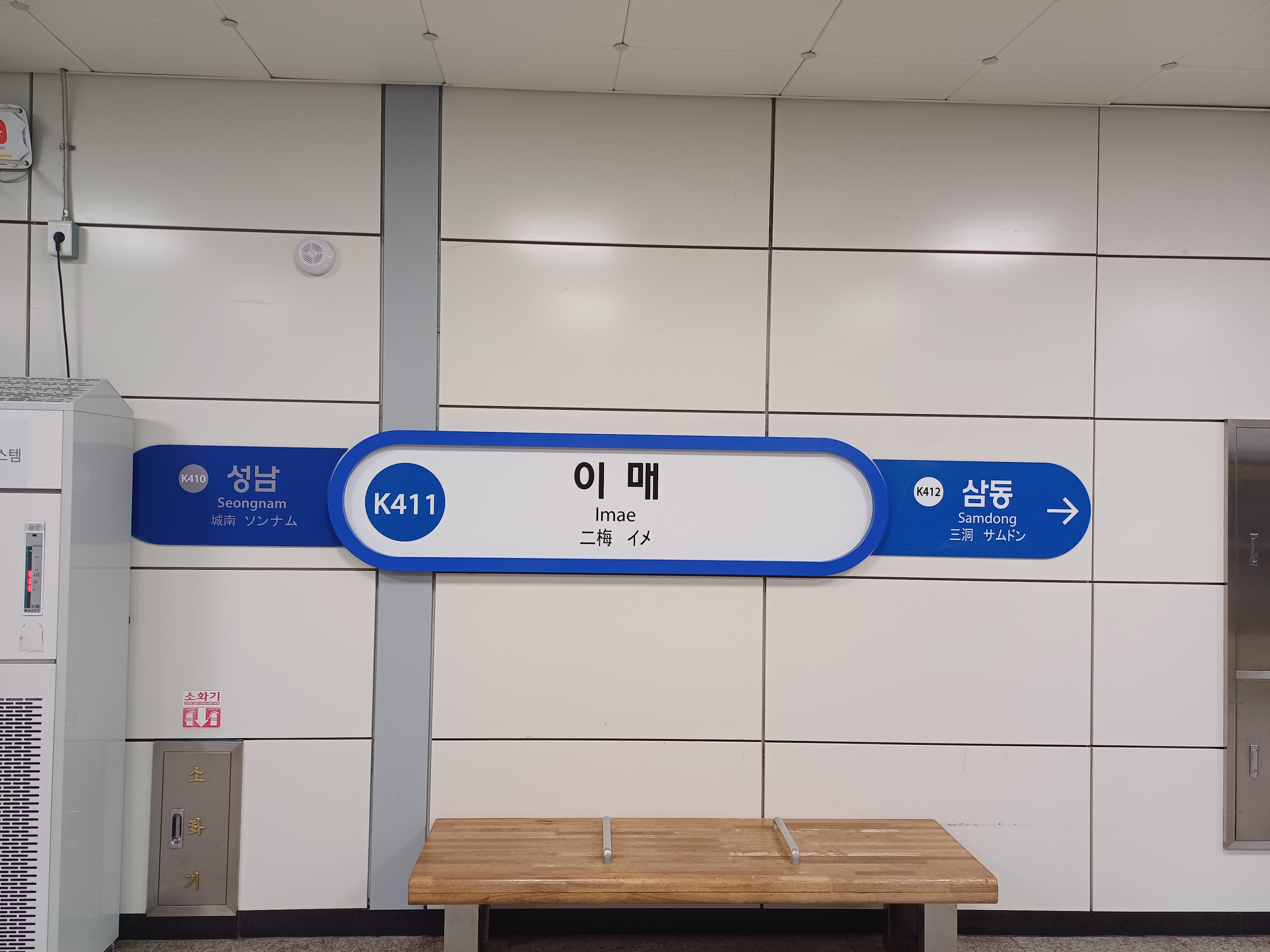
Station sign (Gyeonggang Line)
