= Gonjiam station =

Railway station in Gwangju, South Korea

| 곤지암 (동원대); Gonjiam (Dongwon Univ.) |
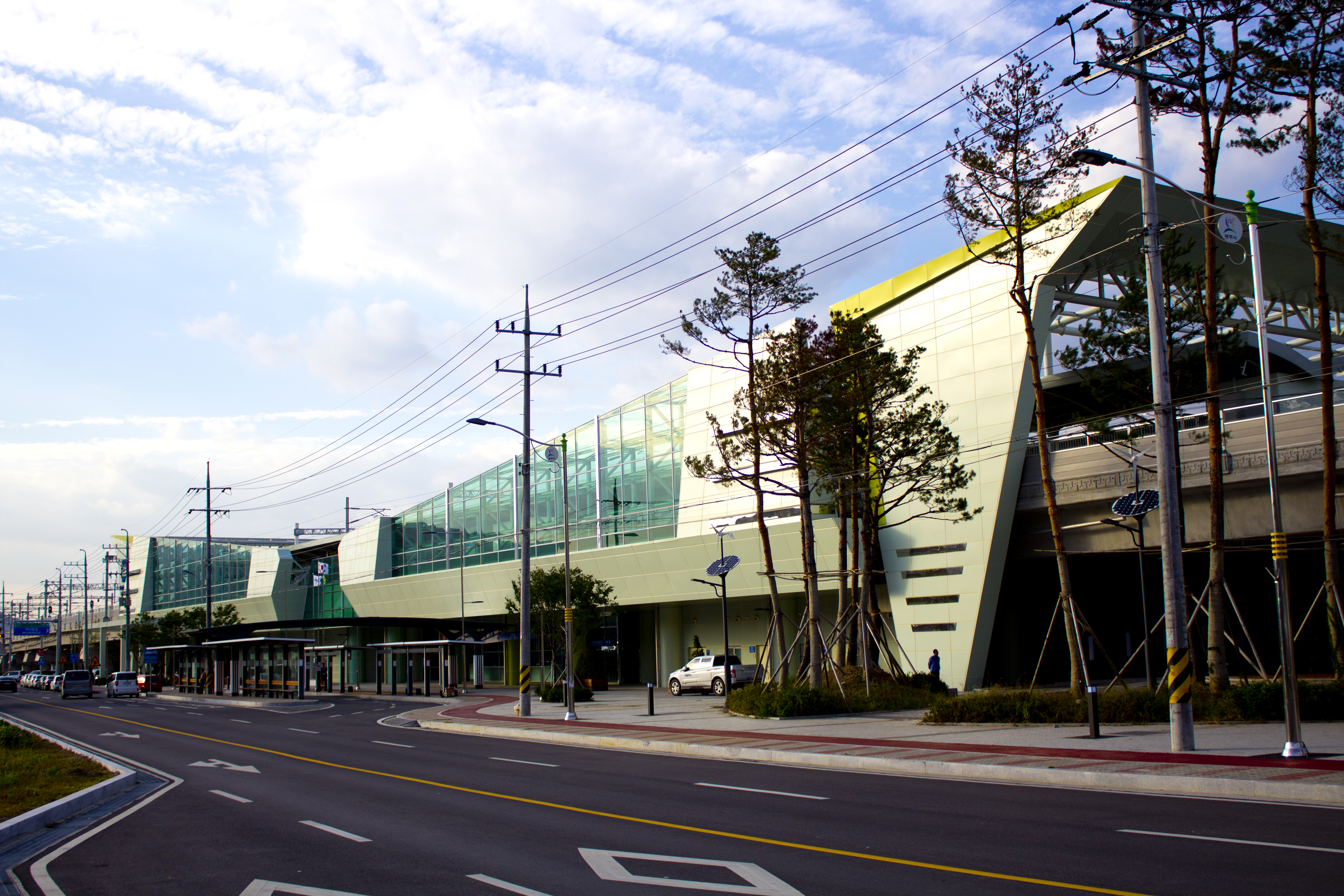
- Gonjiam Station

Korean name
- Hangul: 곤지암역
- Hanja: 昆池岩驛
- RR: Gonjiam-yeok
- MR: Konjiam-yŏk

General information
- Location: Gonjiam-eup, Gwangju, Gyeonggi
- Operator: Korail
- Line: Gyeonggang Line
- Platforms: 2
- Tracks: 2

Construction
- Structure type: Aboveground

History
- Opened: September 24, 2016

Services
| Preceding station | Seoul Metropolitan Subway | Following station |
|---|---|---|
| Chowol towards Pangyo | Gyeonggang Line | Sindundoyechon towards Yeoju |
Location

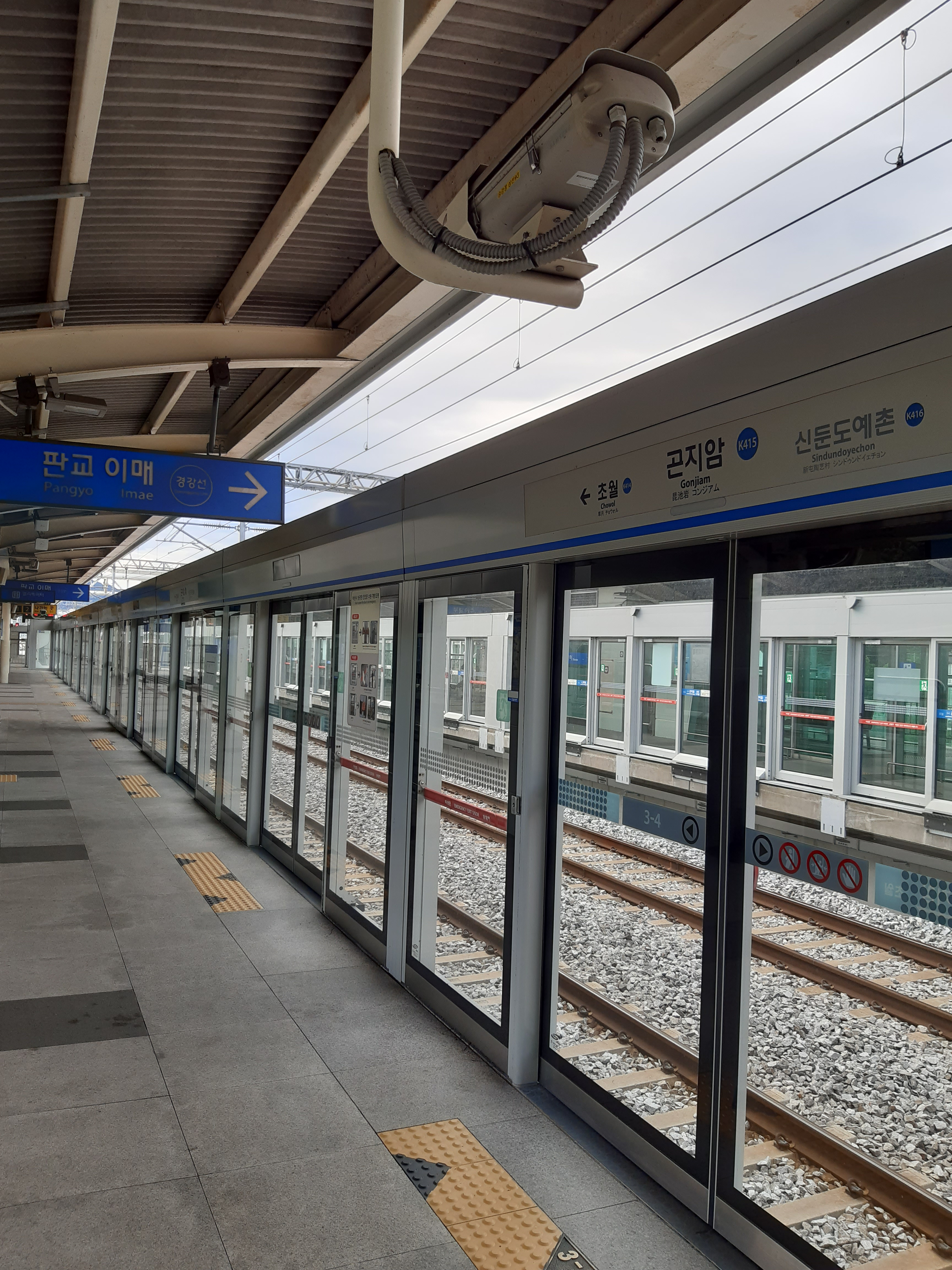
Platform

Gonjiam Station is a railway station on Gyeonggang Line of the Seoul Metropolitan Subway in Gonjiam-eup, Gwangju, Gyeonggi, South Korea.

== Station Layout ==
| L2; Platforms | Side platform, doors will open on the left |
| L2; Platforms | Southbound | Gyeonggang Line toward Yeoju (Sindundoyechon)→ |
| L2; Platforms | Northbound | ← Gyeonggang Line toward Pangyo (Chowol) |
| L2; Platforms | Side platform, doors will open on the left |

| L1; Concourse | Lobby | Customer Service, Shops, Vending machines, ATMs |

| G | Street level | Exit |
