= Sindundoyechon station =

Metro station in Icheon, South Korea

신둔도예촌 (한국관광대); Sindundoyechon (Korea Tourism College)
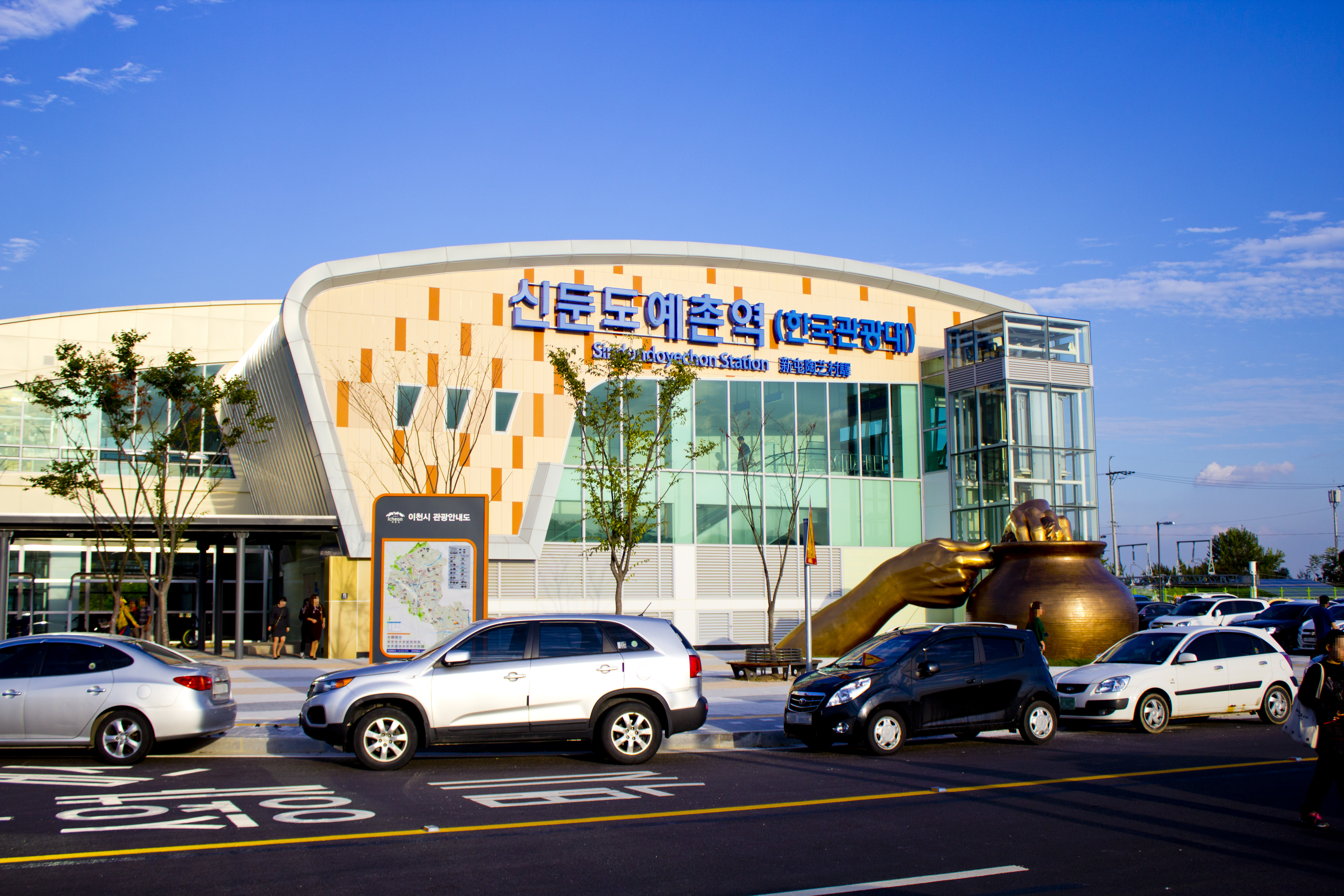
- Station building

Korean name
- Hangul: 신둔도예촌역
- Hanja: 新屯陶藝村驛
- Revised Romanization: Sindundoyechon yeok
- McCune–Reischauer: Sindundoyech'on yŏk

General information
- Location: Sindun-myeon, Icheon, Gyeonggi
- Operator: Korail
- Line: Gyeonggang Line
- Platforms: 2
- Tracks: 2

Construction
- Structure type: Aboveground

History
- Opened: September 24, 2016

Services
Preceding station	Seoul Metropolitan Subway	Following station
Gonjiam towards Pangyo	Gyeonggang Line	Icheon towards Yeoju
Location

Sindundoyechon station is a railway station on Gyeonggang Line of the Seoul Metropolitan Subway in Sindun-myeon, Icheon, Gyeonggi, South Korea.

== Station layout ==
2 Platforms	Side platform, doors will open on the left
2 Platforms	Southbound	Gyeonggang Line toward Yeoju (Icheon)→
2 Platforms	Northbound	← Gyeonggang Line toward Pangyo (Gonjiam)
2 Platforms	Side platform, doors will open on the left

1 Concourse	Lobby	Customer Service, Shops, Vending machines, ATMs

G	Street level	Exit
