= Gyeonggi Gwangju station =

Railway station in Gwangju, Gyeonggi, South Korea

경기광주 (ICT폴리텍대학); Gyeonggi Gwangju (ICT Polytech Institute of Korea)
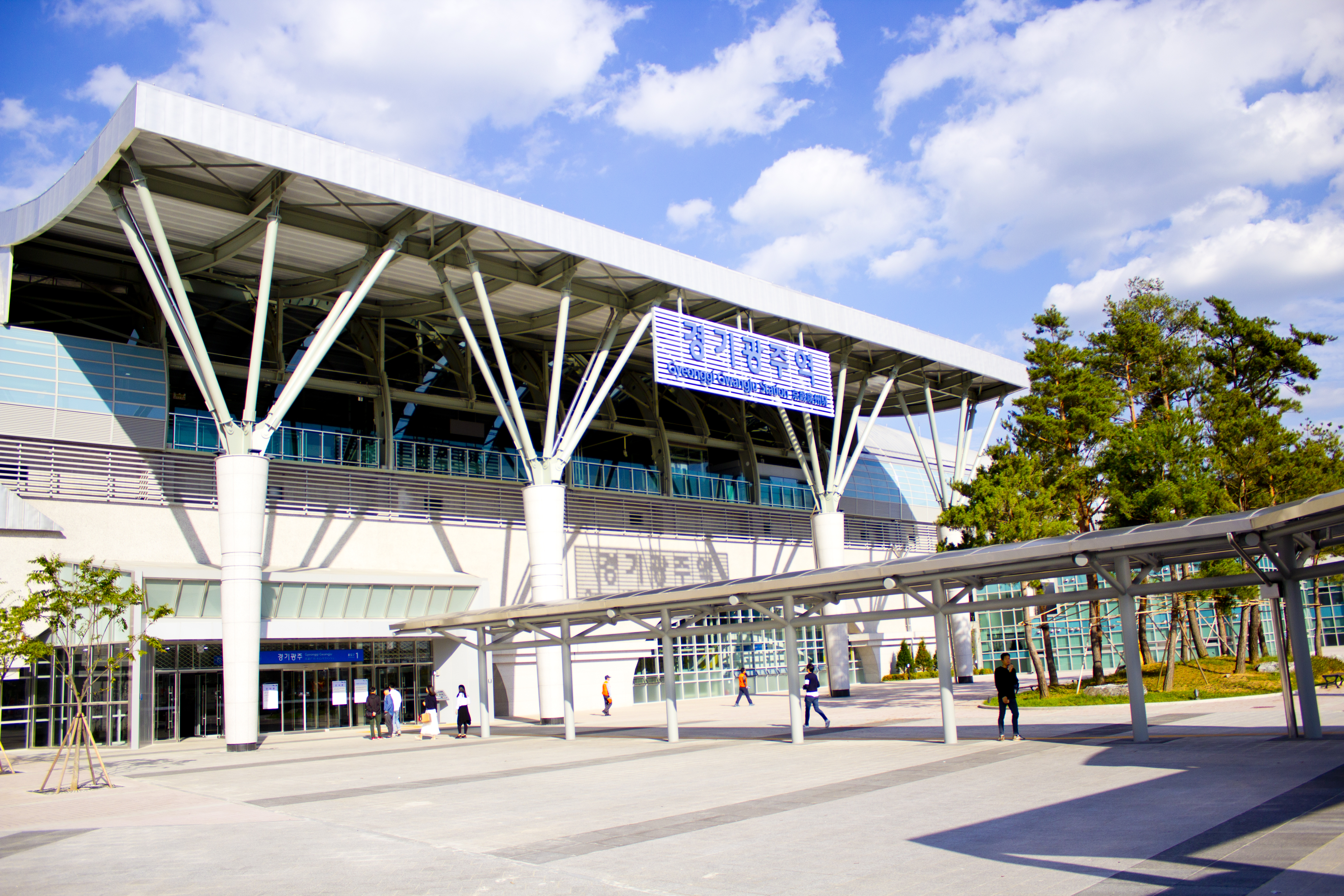

Korean name
- Hangul: 경기광주역
- Hanja: 京畿廣州驛
- Revised Romanization: Gyeonggi Gwangju yeok
- McCune–Reischauer: Kyŏnggi Kwangju yŏk

General information
- Location: Yeok-dong, Gwangju, Gyeonggi
- Coordinates: 37°23′57.113″N 127°15′9.544″E
- Operated by: Korail
- Line(s): Gyeonggang Line
- Platforms: 2
- Tracks: 2

Construction
- Structure type: Aboveground

History
- Opened: September 24, 2016

Services
Preceding station	Seoul Metropolitan Subway	Following station
Samdong towards Pangyo	Gyeonggang Line	Chowol towards Yeoju

Gyeonggi Gwangju Station (Korean: 경기광주역; Hanja: 京畿廣州驛) is a railway station on the Gyeonggang Line of the Seoul Metropolitan Subway. It is located at Yeok-dong, Gwangju, Gyeonggi, South Korea. By 2016, it served 8000-9000 passengers a day.

== Station layout ==
L2; Platforms	Side platform, doors will open on the left
L2; Platforms	Southbound	Gyeonggang Line toward Yeoju (Chowol)→
L2; Platforms	Northbound	← Gyeonggang Line toward Pangyo (Samdong)
L2; Platforms	Side platform, doors will open on the left

L1; Concourse	Lobby	Customer Service, Shops, Vending machines, ATMs

G	Street level	Exit
