= 城南驛 =

城南驛 or 城南駅 may refer to:

- Seongnam station (disambiguation)
  - Seongnam station (Gyeonggi)
- Seiaichūkōmae Station, also called as Jōnan Station
