= Icheon station =

Railway station in Icheon, South Korea

이천; Icheon
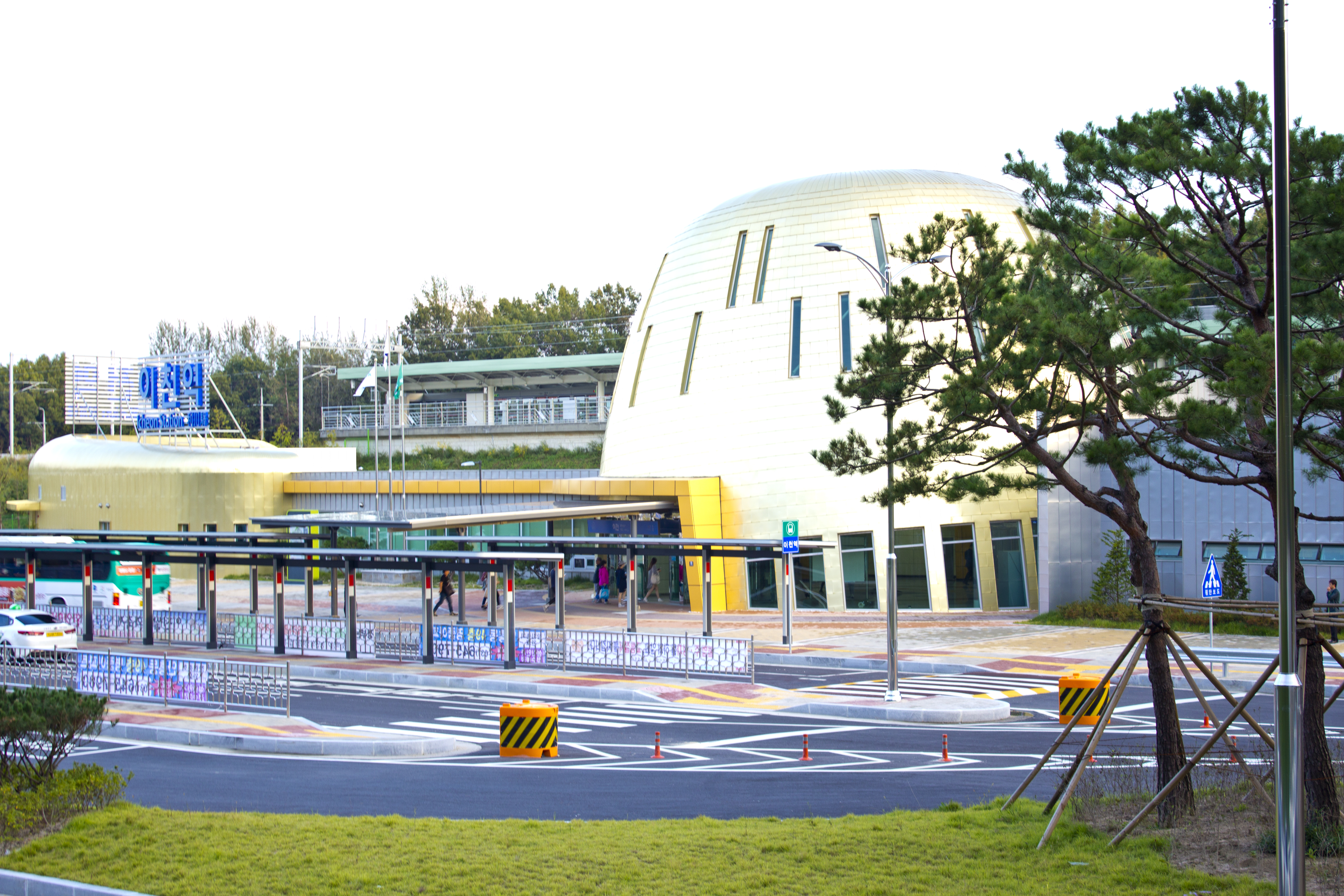
- Icheon station

Korean name
- Hangul: 이천역
- Hanja: 利川驛
- RR: Icheon-yeok
- MR: Ich'ŏn-yŏk

General information
- Location: Yulhyeon-dong, Icheon, Gyeonggi
- Operator: Korail
- Line: Gyeonggang Line
- Platforms: 2
- Tracks: 2

Construction
- Structure type: Aboveground

History
- Opened: September 24, 2016

Services
Preceding station	Seoul Metropolitan Subway	Following station
Sindundoyechon towards Pangyo	Gyeonggang Line	Bubal towards Yeoju
Location

Icheon station is a railway station on Gyeonggang Line of the Seoul Metropolitan Subway in Yulhyeon-dong, Icheon, Gyeonggi, South Korea

== Station layout ==
L2; Platforms	Side platform, doors will open on the left
L2; Platforms	Southbound	Gyeonggang Line toward Yeoju (Bubal)→
L2; Platforms	Northbound	← Gyeonggang Line toward Pangyo (Sindundoyechon)
L2; Platforms	Side platform, doors will open on the left

L1; Concourse	Lobby	Customer Service, Shops, Vending machines, ATMs

G	Street level	Exit
