= Korail Class 371000 =

South Korean train

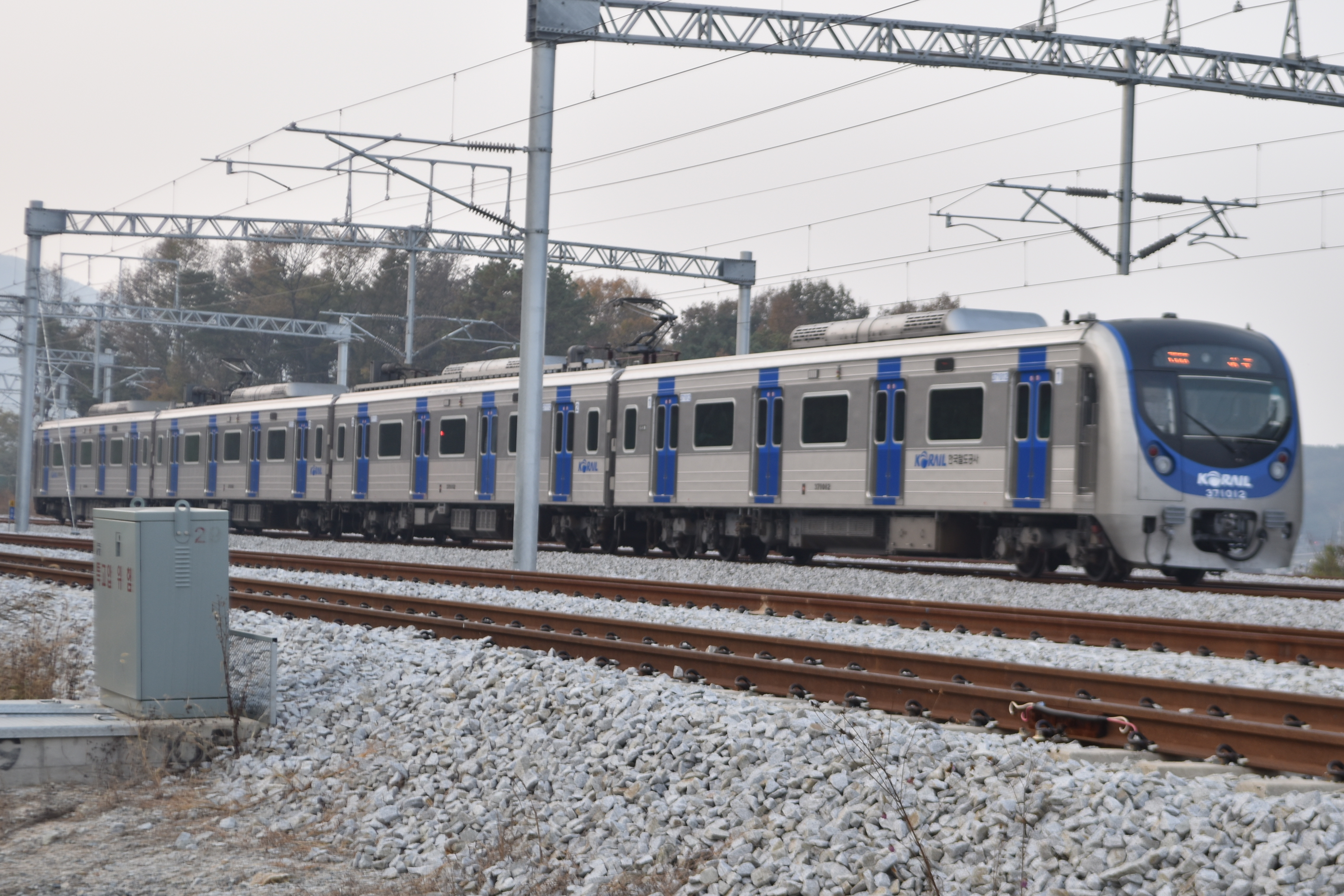
- Class 371000 train 371x12 at Yeoju

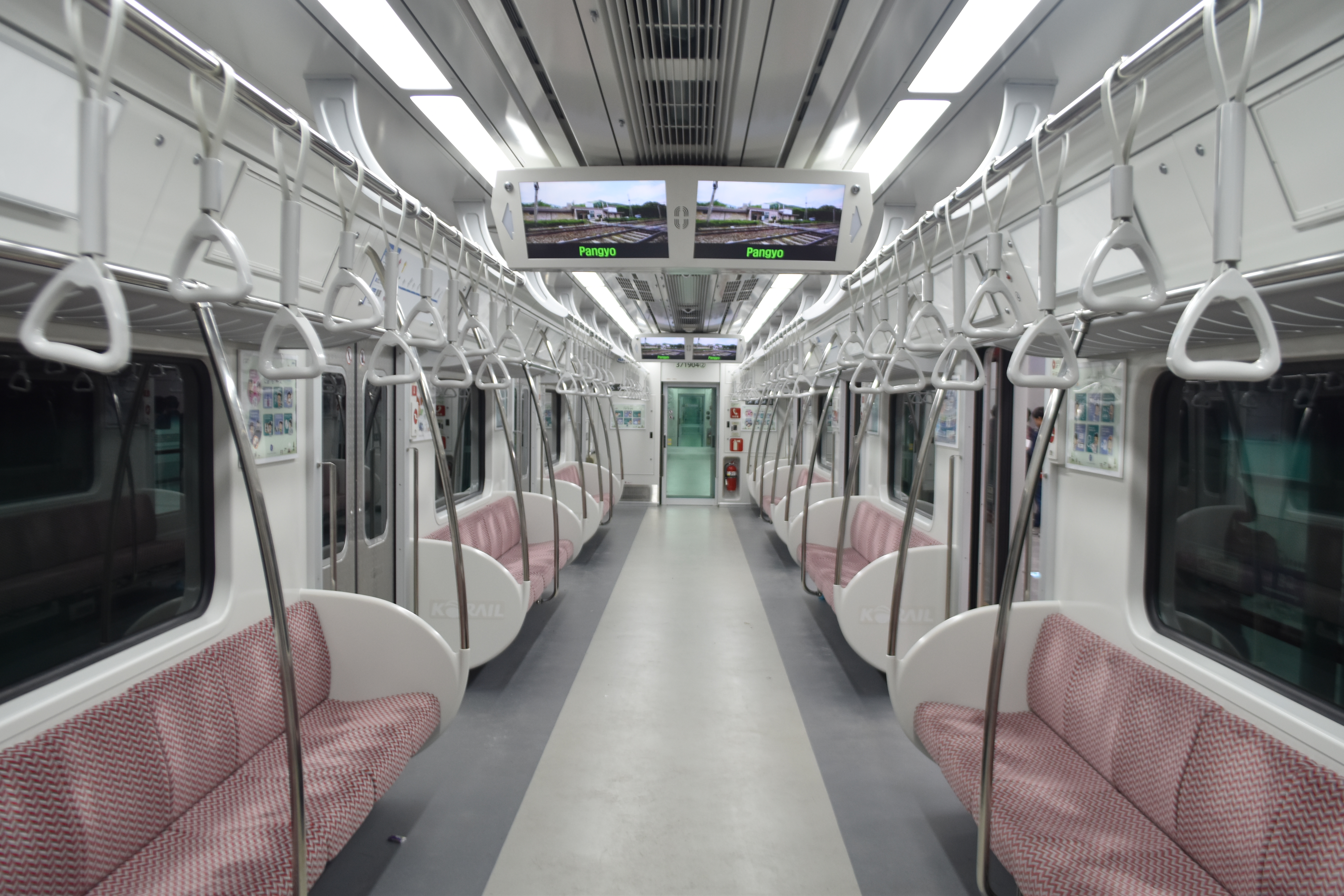
- Interior
- Stock type: Electric multiple unit
- In service: 2016–present
- Manufacturer: Hyundai Rotem
- Constructed: 2016
- Formation: 4 cars per train TC-M'-M'-TC
- Operator: Korail
- Depot: Bubal
- Line served: Gyeonggang Line (371000)

Specifications
- Car body construction: Aluminum
- Doors: 4 per side, 8 per car
- Maximum speed: 110 km/h (68 mph) (service); 120 km/h (75 mph) (design)
- Traction system: Toshiba COVO52-A0 IGBT-VVVF propulsion system using IGBT 1C4M motors
- Power output: 4,400 kW (5,900 hp)
- Acceleration: 3 km/(h⋅s) (1.9 mph/s)
- Deceleration: 3.5 km/(h⋅s) (2.2 mph/s) (service); 4.5 km/(h⋅s) (2.8 mph/s) (emergency)
- Electric system: 25 kV 60 Hz AC
- Current collection: Overhead
- Safety systems: ATS, ATP(Ansaldo), ATC
- Coupling system: Shibata-type
- Headlight type: Light-emitting diode
- Track gauge: 1,435 mm (4 ft 8 1/2 in)

The Korail Class 371000 trains are commuter electric multiple units in South Korea used on the Gyeonggang Line.

== Technical details ==
=== Electrical parts ===
All trains use IGBT controls and use passive cooling with a heat pipe. The trains are also equipped with regenerative braking, reducing energy consumption and simplifying train inspection, and they use electric door motors.

All trains use LED headlights. There is a third headlight in the same compartment that houses the train run number and destination sign.

=== Cabin ===
The Class 371000 trains share the same cabin design with the 2016 batch of the 3rd generation Class 311000 trains (trains 311-95~311-99). Stop notifiers are installed, as are TGIS color displays. Dead section notifiers are also installed.

== Formation ==
The Class 371000 trains are organized in the following formation: TC-M'-M'-TC

The symbols are defined below.

- M' car: Pantograph, main transformer, controller, motor
- TC car: Secondary power device, air compressor, battery, cabin

The cars of each train are numbered to correspond to the type of car each car is: 3710XX - Tc (SIV, air compressor, battery) 3711XX - M' (pantograph, transformer, inverter) 3712XX - M' (pantograph, transformer, inverter) 3719XX - Tc (SIV, air compressor, battery)

== Depot ==
The Class 371000 trains are stored at the Bubal train depot.

== Trains ==
The Class 371000 trains are numbered 371-01~371-12. Delivery of the trains began on February 19, 2016, and continued until August 19, 2016.

== See also ==
- Korail
- Gyeonggang Line
