= Bubal station =

Railway station in South Korea

부발
Bubal
| 부발; Bubal |
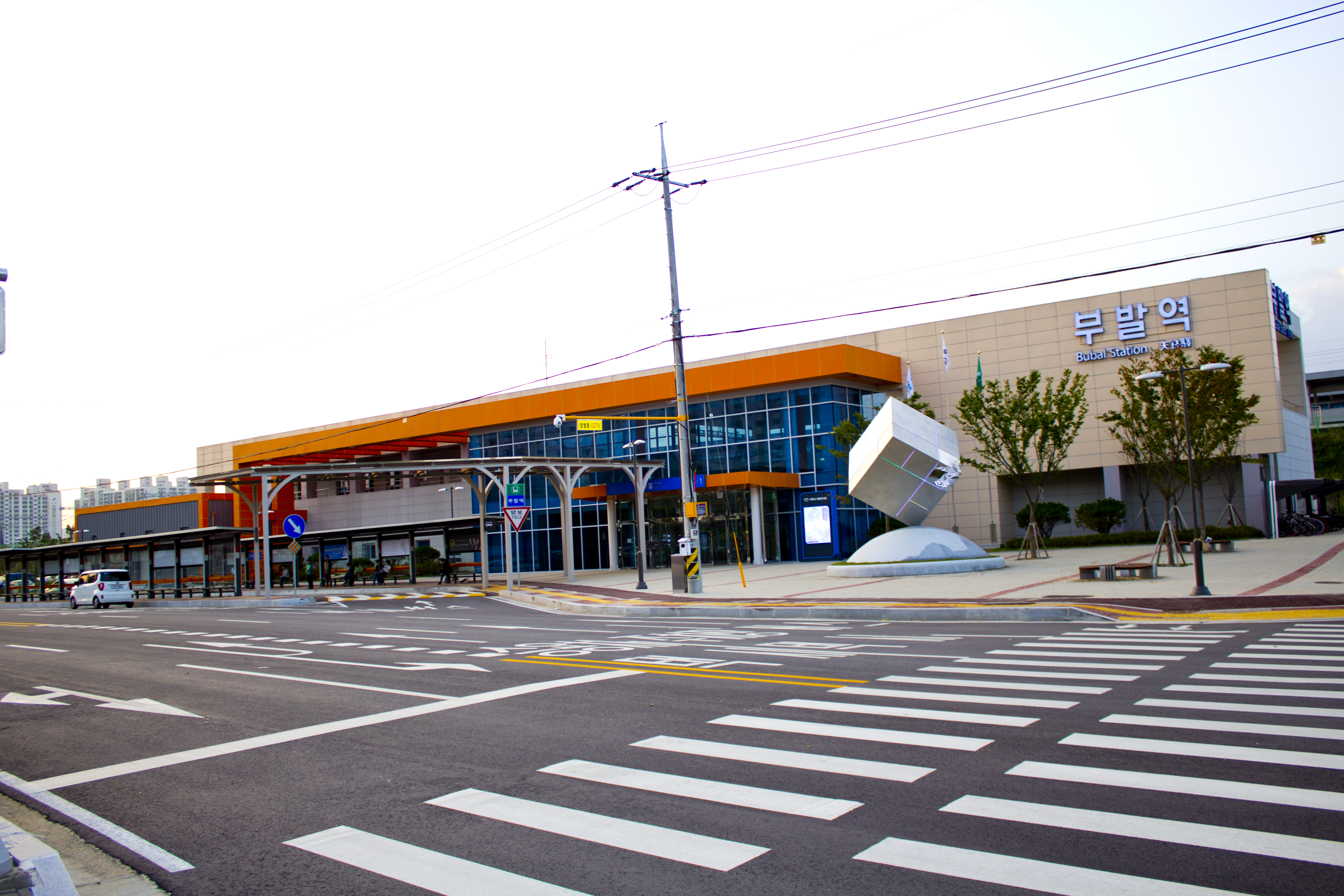
- Bubal station

Korean name
- Hangul: 부발역
- Hanja: 夫鉢驛
- RR: Bubal-yeok
- MR: Pubal-yŏk

General information
- Location: Bubal-eup, Icheon, Gyeonggi
- Coordinates: 37.25989°N 127.48853°E
- Operator: Korail
- Line: Gyeonggang Line
- Platforms: 2
- Tracks: 2

Construction
- Structure type: Aboveground

History
- Opened: September 24, 2016

Services
| Preceding station | Seoul Metropolitan Subway | Following station |
|---|---|---|
| Icheon towards Pangyo | Gyeonggang Line | Sejongdaewangneung towards Yeoju |
| Preceding station | Korea Train Express | Following station |
| Pangyo Terminus | Jungbunaeryuk KTX | Ganam towards Mungyeong |
Location

Bubal station (Korean: 부발역) is a railway station on Gyeonggang Line of the Seoul Metropolitan Subway and semi-high-speed Jungbunaeryuk Line in Bubal-eup, Icheon, Gyeonggi Province, South Korea. The former line is used by suburban trains that share the Seoul Subway's ticketing system, and the latter by high-speed Korea Train Express (KTX) trains.

== Station layout ==
| L2; Platforms | Side platform, doors will open on the left |
| L2; Platforms | Southbound | Gyeonggang Line toward Yeoju (Sejongdaewangneung)→ |
| L2; Platforms | Northbound | ← Gyeonggang Line toward Pangyo (Icheon) |
| L2; Platforms | Side platform, doors will open on the left |

| L1; Concourse | Lobby | Customer Service, Shops, Vending machines, ATMs |

| G | Street level | Exit |
