= Sejongdaewangneung station =

Metro station in Yeoju, South Korea

세종대왕릉; Sejongdaewangneung
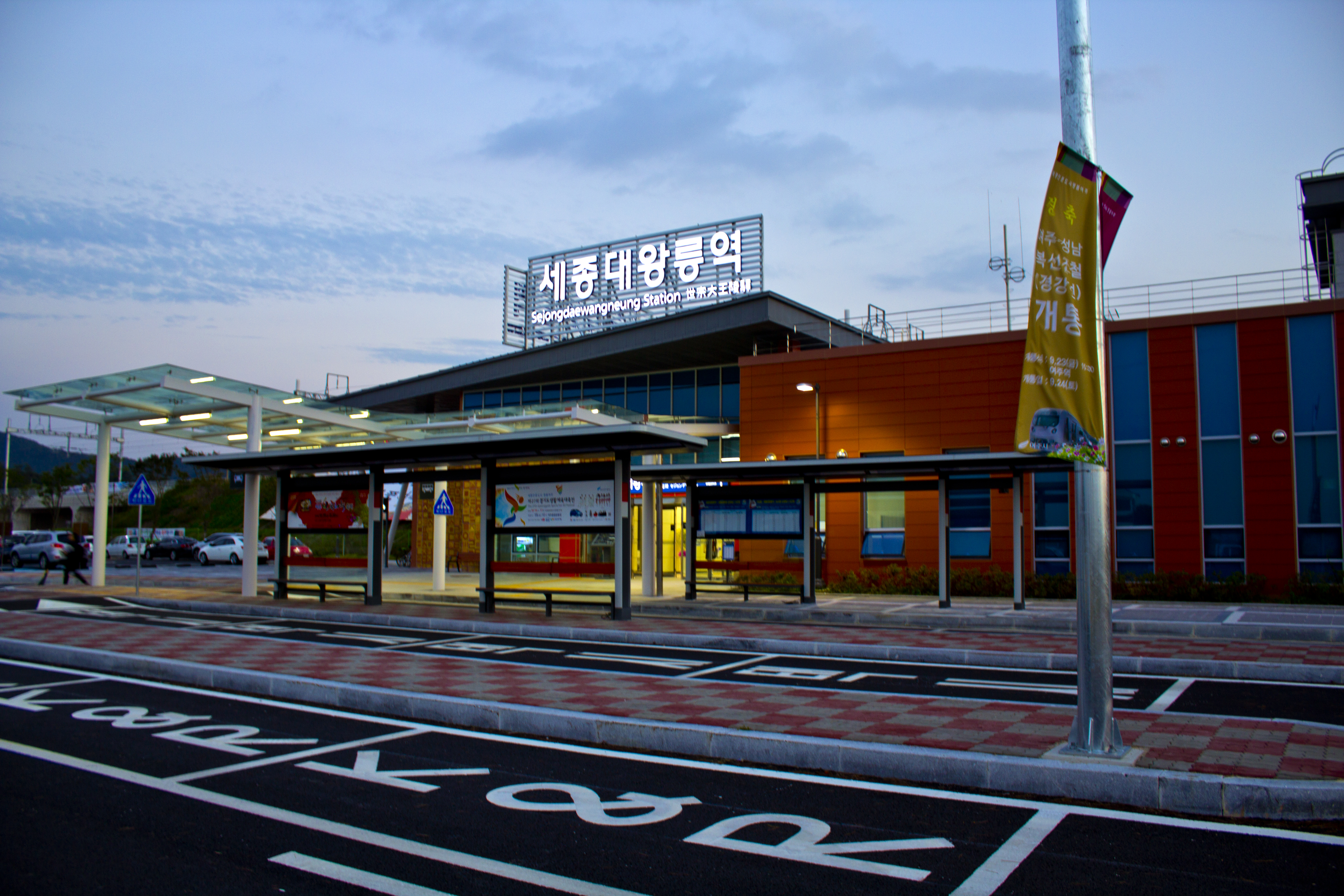
- Station building

Korean name
- Hangul: 세종대왕릉역
- Hanja: 世宗大王陵驛
- Revised Romanization: Sejongdaewangneung-yeok
- McCune–Reischauer: Sejongdaewangnŭng-yŏk

General information
- Location: Neungseo-myeon, Yeoju, Gyeonggi
- Operated by: Korail
- Line: Gyeonggang Line
- Platforms: 2
- Tracks: 2

Construction
- Structure type: Aboveground

History
- Opened: September 24, 2016

Services
Preceding station	Seoul Metropolitan Subway	Following station
Bubal towards Pangyo	Gyeonggang Line	Yeoju Terminus
Location

Sejongdaewangneung station is a railway station on Gyeonggang Line of the Seoul Metropolitan Subway.

== Station layout ==
L2; Platforms	Side platform, doors will open on the left
L2; Platforms	Southbound	Gyeonggang Line toward Yeoju (Terminus)→
L2; Platforms	Northbound	← Gyeonggang Line toward Pangyo (Bubal)
L2; Platforms	Side platform, doors will open on the left

L1; Concourse	Lobby	Customer Service, Shops, Vending machines, ATMs

G	Street level	Exit
