= Seongnam station =

Seongnam station may refer to one of the following railroad stations in South Korea:

- Seongnam station (Gyeonggi) (Korean: 성남역), in Bundang, on GTX-A and Gyeonggang Line
- Seongnam station (Incheon) (Korean: 석남역), at Geobuk Market, on Incheon Subway Line 2 and Seoul Subway Line 7
