= Yatap station =

Metro station in Seongnam, South Korea

Coordinates: 37.411244°N 127.128682°E

야탑; Yatap
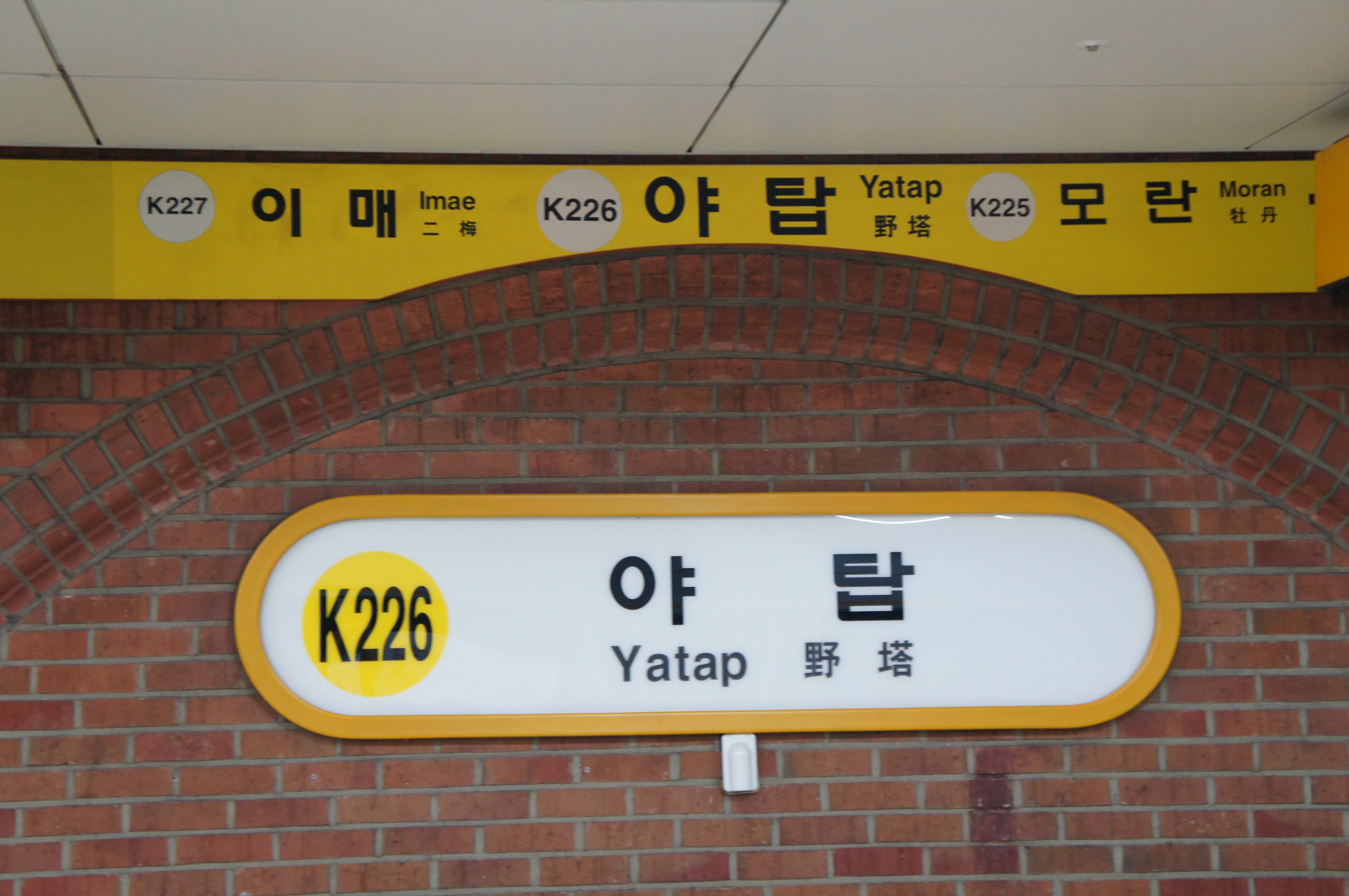

Korean name
- Hangul: 야탑역
- Hanja: 野塔驛
- Revised Romanization: Yatap-yeok
- McCune–Reischauer: Yat'ap-yŏk

General information
- Location: 688-1 Yatap-dong, Bundang-gu, Seongnam-si, Gyeonggi-do
- Operator: Korail
- Line: Suin–Bundang Line
- Platforms: 2
- Tracks: 2

Construction
- Structure type: Underground

Key dates
- September 1, 1994: Suin–Bundang Line opened
Location

Yatap Station (Korean: 야탑역) is a station on the Suin–Bundang Line between Moran and Imae. Around the station, there are two big shopping malls: Kim's Club and Homeplus. Also, Yatap CGV Multiplex and Seongnam Bus Terminal are near the station. The Yatap CGV Multiplex in the basement of the Homeplus is connected by an underground passageway to Yatap Station.

== Vicinity ==
- Exit 1: Yatap Middle School, Yatap Post Office
- Exit 2: Dolma Elementary School
- Exit 3: Bundang Health Center, Bundang Cha Hospital, Tancheon Sports Complex (Home ground of the Seongnam FC)
- Exit 4: Seongnam Bus Terminal, Yatap Elementary School

Preceding station	Seoul Metropolitan Subway	Following station
Moran towards Cheongnyangni	Suin–Bundang Line	Imae towards Incheon
