= Gyeonggang Line =

Railway line in Gyeonggi-do and Gangwon-do, South Korea

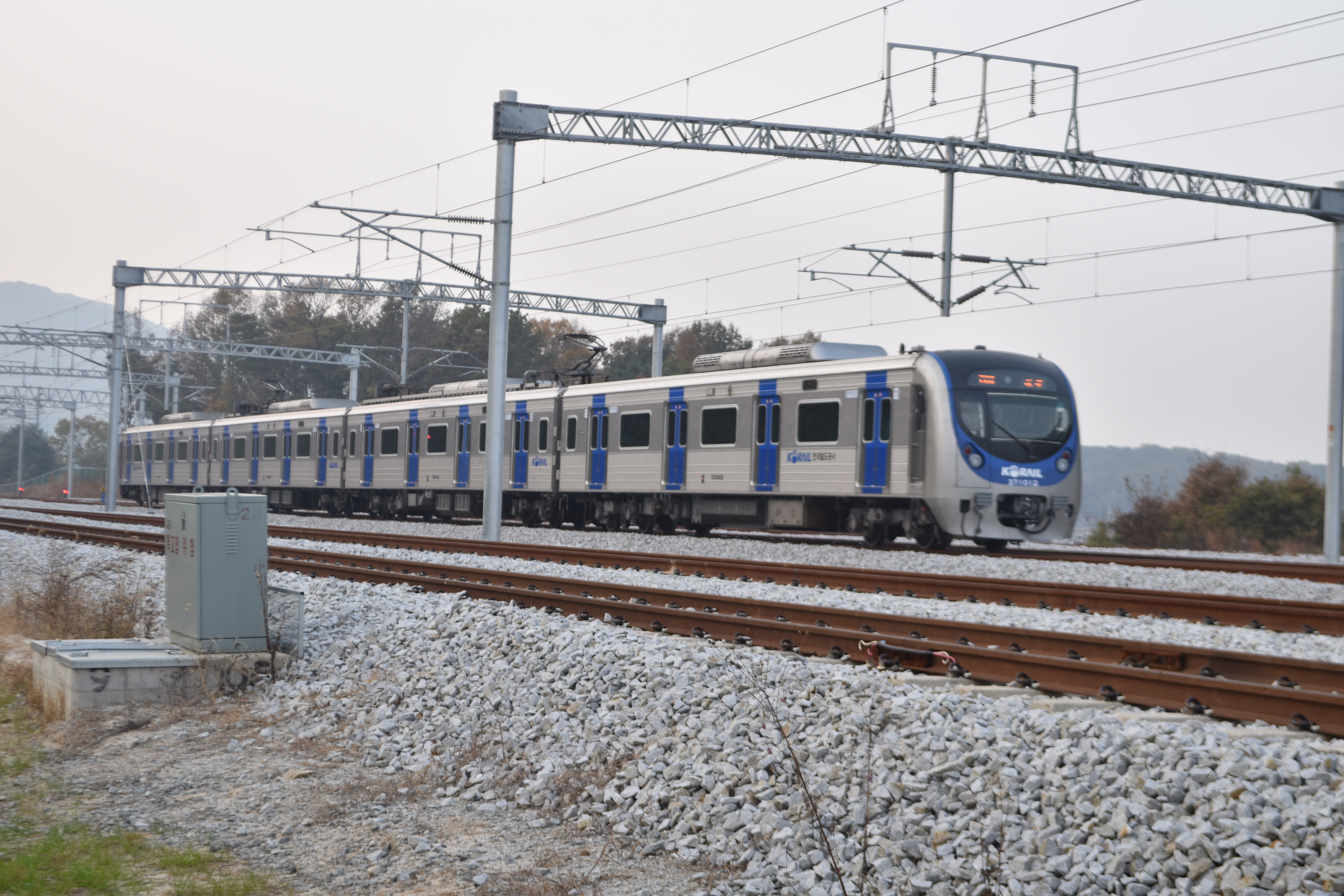
- Korail Class 371000 EMU

Overview
- Native name: 경강선(京江線); Gyeonggangseon
- Status: Operational: Pangyo - Yeoju; Seowonju - Gangneung; Under construction: Wolgot - Pangyo; Yeoju - Seowonju
- Owner: South Korean government
- Locale: Gyeonggi Province, South Korea; Gangwon Province, South Korea
- Termini: Pangyo; Bubal / Yeoju
- Stations: 18

Service
- Type: Commuter rail (Pangyo - Yeoju); Intercity rail (Seowonju - Gangneung)
- System: Seoul Metropolitan Subway (Pangyo - Yeoju)
- Operator: Korail
- Depot(s): Bubal Depot, Gangneung Depot
- Rolling stock: Korail Class 371000 (12 trains); KTX-Eum; KTX-Sancheon (until 2021)

History
- Opened: September 24, 2016 (Pangyo - Yeoju); December 2017 (Seowonju - Gangneung)

Technical
- Line length: 53.8 km (33.4 mi) or 54.8 km (34.1 mi)
- Number of tracks: 2
- Track gauge: 1,435 mm (4 ft 8 1/2 in)
- Electrification: AC 25,000 V 60 Hz
Route map
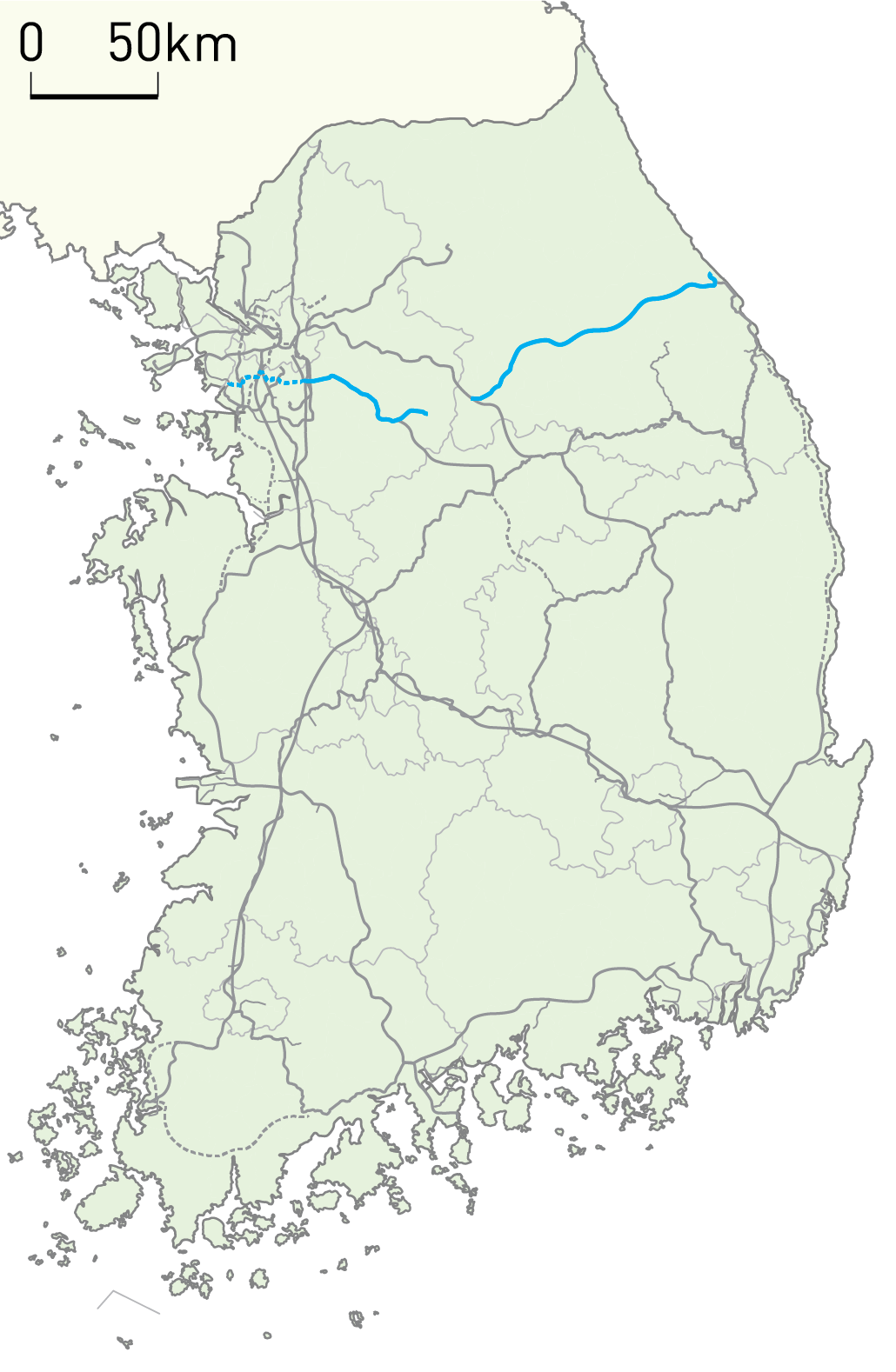

The Gyeonggang Line (경강선) is a rail line in South Korea, which at present comprises two distinct sections. The first one, which opened on September 24, 2016, is part of the Seoul Metropolitan Subway system in Gyeonggi Province, South Korea, and runs from the city of Seongnam to Yeoju City, partially coinciding with the route of the former narrow-gauge Suryeo Line. The second section, which is located entirely in Gangwon Province, runs between Gangneung and Wonju and opened on December 22, 2017, ahead of the 2018 Winter Olympics that South Korea hosted in February 2018. This section of the line offers KTX service from Seoul, through the Jungang Line. In the future, the two sections are to be connected, and the Gyeonggang Line will be extended westwards to Siheung.

== History ==
September 24, 2016: The first section of the line opens from Pangyo to Yeoju.
December 22, 2017: The second section of the line opens from Seowonju station to Gangneung station.

=== Future ===
The Gyeonggang Line is planned to run all the way from Incheon to Wonju. The line is planned to be extended west of Pangyo to Wolgot on the existing Suin Line, and east of Yeoju to Seowonju.

== Rolling stock ==
- Korail Class 371000 (12 trains)
- KTX-Eum (since 2021)
- KTX-Sancheon (until 2021)

== Stations ==
=== Current Routes ===
- Pangyo — Bubal/Yeoju (Gyeonggang Line)
- Pangyo — Mungyeong (Jungbunaeryuk Line - KTX-Eum)

=== Wolgot-Pangyo ===
This section is expected to start construction soon but will open no earlier than late 2029.

Station number	Station name			Transfer	Distance in km		Location
Station number	Romanized	Hangul	Hanja	Transfer	Station distance	Total distance	Location
	Wolgot	월곶	月串	Suin–Bundang Line	---	0.0	Siheung-si
	Janggok	대장	長谷				Siheung-si
	Siheung City Hall	시흥시청	始興市廳	, Sin Ansan Line (2024)			Siheung-si
	Maehwa	매화	梅花	Sin Ansan Line (2024)			Siheung-si
	Gwangmyeong	광명	光明	(Gwangmyeong Shuttle); Sinansan Line (2024) Gyeongbu HSR; Gyeongbu; Honam; Honam HSR; Gyeongjeon; Jeolla			Gwangmyeong-si
	Manan	만안	萬安				Anyang-si
	Anyang	안양	安養	Seoul Subway Line 1			Anyang-si
	Anyang Stadium	안양운동장	安養運動場				Anyang-si
	Indeogwon	인덕원	仁德院	Seoul Subway Line 4			Anyang-si
	Cheonggye	청계	淸溪				Uiwang-si
	Seopangyo	서판교	西板橋				Seongnam-si

=== Pangyo-Yeoju ===
This section opened in September 2016. Initially, the line utilizes Class 371000 cars.

The entire line is in Gyeonggi province.

Station number	Station name			Transfer	Distance in km		Location	
Station number	Romanized	Hangul	Hanja	Transfer	Station distance	Total distance	Location	
K409	Pangyo	판교	板橋	Wolgot-Pangyo section (Late 2029)	---	0.0	Seongnam-si	Bundang-gu
K410	Seongnam	성남	城南	Great Train eXpress	0.7		Seongnam-si	Bundang-gu
K411	Imae	이매	二梅	Suin–Bundang Line	0.8	1.5	Seongnam-si	Bundang-gu
K412	Samdong	삼동	三洞		6.9	8.4	Gwangju-si	
K413	Gyeonggi Gwangju	경기광주	京畿廣州		4.8	13.2	Gwangju-si	
K414	Chowol	초월	草月		5.1	18.3	Gwangju-si	
K415	Gonjiam	곤지암	昆池岩		4.9	23.2	Gwangju-si	
K416	Sindundoyechon	신둔도예촌	新屯陶藝村		7.0	30.2	Icheon-si	
K417	Icheon	이천	利川		7.3	37.5	Icheon-si	
K418	Bubal	부발	夫鉢	KTX	4.5	42.0	Icheon-si	
K419	Sejongdaewangneung	세종대왕릉	世宗大王陵		7.4	49.4	Yeoju-si	
K420	Yeoju	여주	驪州	Yeoju-Seowonju section	5.4	54.8	Yeoju-si	

=== Yeoju-Seowonju ===
The entire route is scheduled to open in 2027.

=== Seowonju-Gangneung ===
This section opened on December 22, 2017, just before the 2018 Winter Olympics. It is a different line, so it is called the Gangneung Line. The line offers KTX-Eum services. This line is designated as a semi-high-speed line.

The entire line is in Gangwon province.

Station name			Transfer	Distance in km		Location
Romanized	Hangul	Hanja	Transfer	Station distance	Total distance	Location
Seowonju	서원주	西原州	Jungang Line; Yeoju-Seowonju section	---	0.0	Wonju-si
Manjong	만종	萬鍾		4.7	4.7	Wonju-si
Hoengseong	횡성	橫城		18.3	23.0	Hoengseong-gun
Dunnae	둔내	屯內		20.6	43.6	Hoengseong-gun
Pyeongchang	평창	平昌		20.0	63.6	Pyeongchang-gun
Jinbu	진부	珍富		16.3	79.9	Pyeongchang-gun
Gangneung	강릉	江陵	Yeongdong Line	40.3	120.2	Gangneung-si
