= Seongnam station (Gyeonggi) =

Subway station in Seoul, South Korea

성남; Seongnam
성남; Seongnam
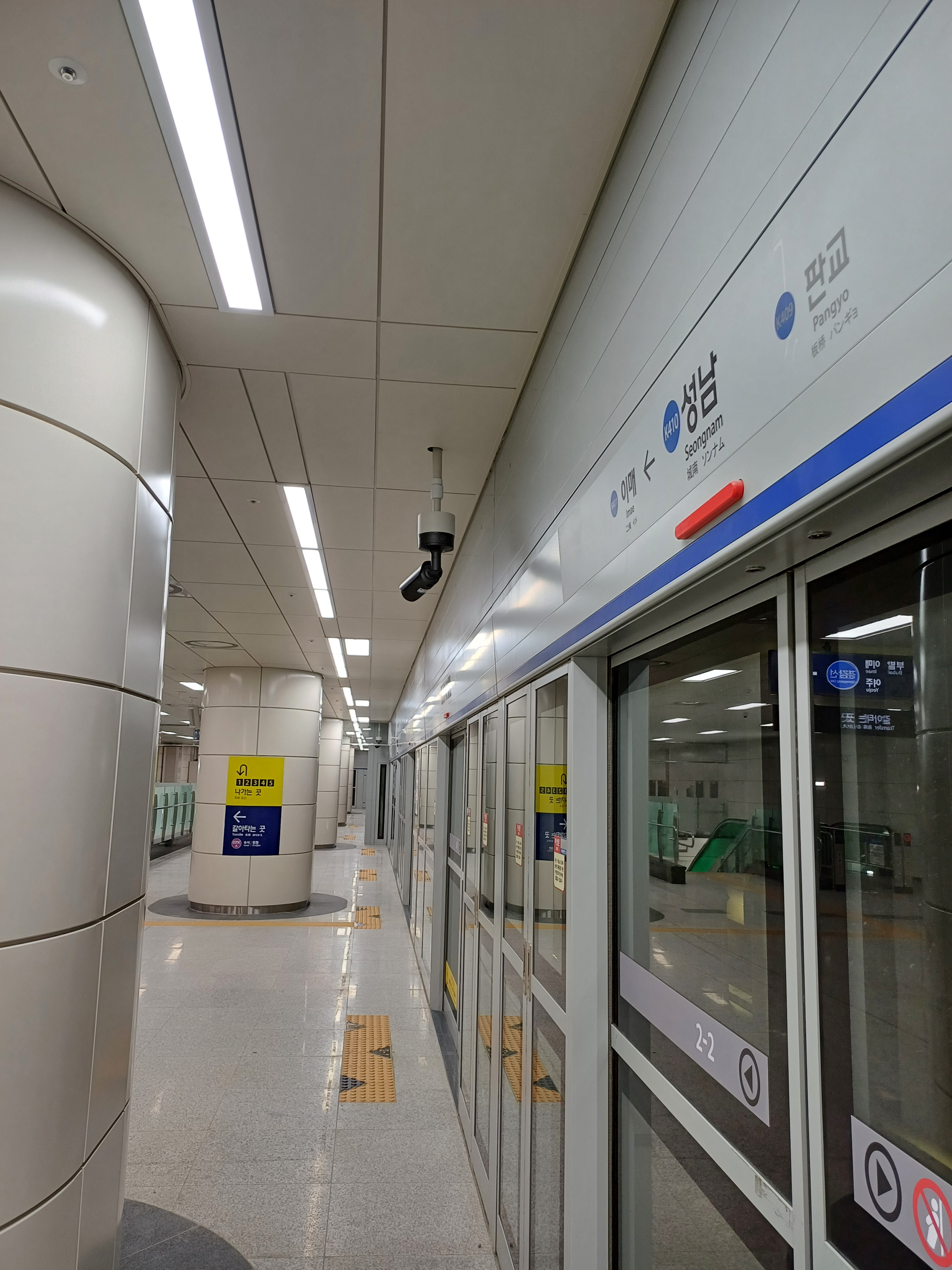
- Gyeonggang Line platform

Korean name
- Hangul: 성남역
- Hanja: 城南驛
- RR: Seongnam-yeok
- MR: Sŏngnam-yŏk

General information
- Location: Baekhyeon-dong, Bundang-gu, Seongnam-si, Gyeonggi-do
- Coordinates: 37°23′41″N 127°07′10″E
- Operator: Korail; GTX-A Operation
- Lines: GTX-A; Gyeonggang Line
- Platforms: 1
- Tracks: 2

History
- Opened: March 30, 2024

Services
Preceding station	Seoul Metropolitan Subway	Following station
Pangyo Terminus	Gyeonggang Line	Imae towards Yeoju
Suseo Terminus	GTX-A	Guseong towards Dongtan
Location

Seongnam Station (Korean: 성남역; Hanja: 城南驛) is a railway station on GTX-A and Gyeonggang Line of the Seoul Metropolitan Subway. It is located at Baekhyeon-dong, Bundang, Seongnam, Gyeonggi, South Korea.

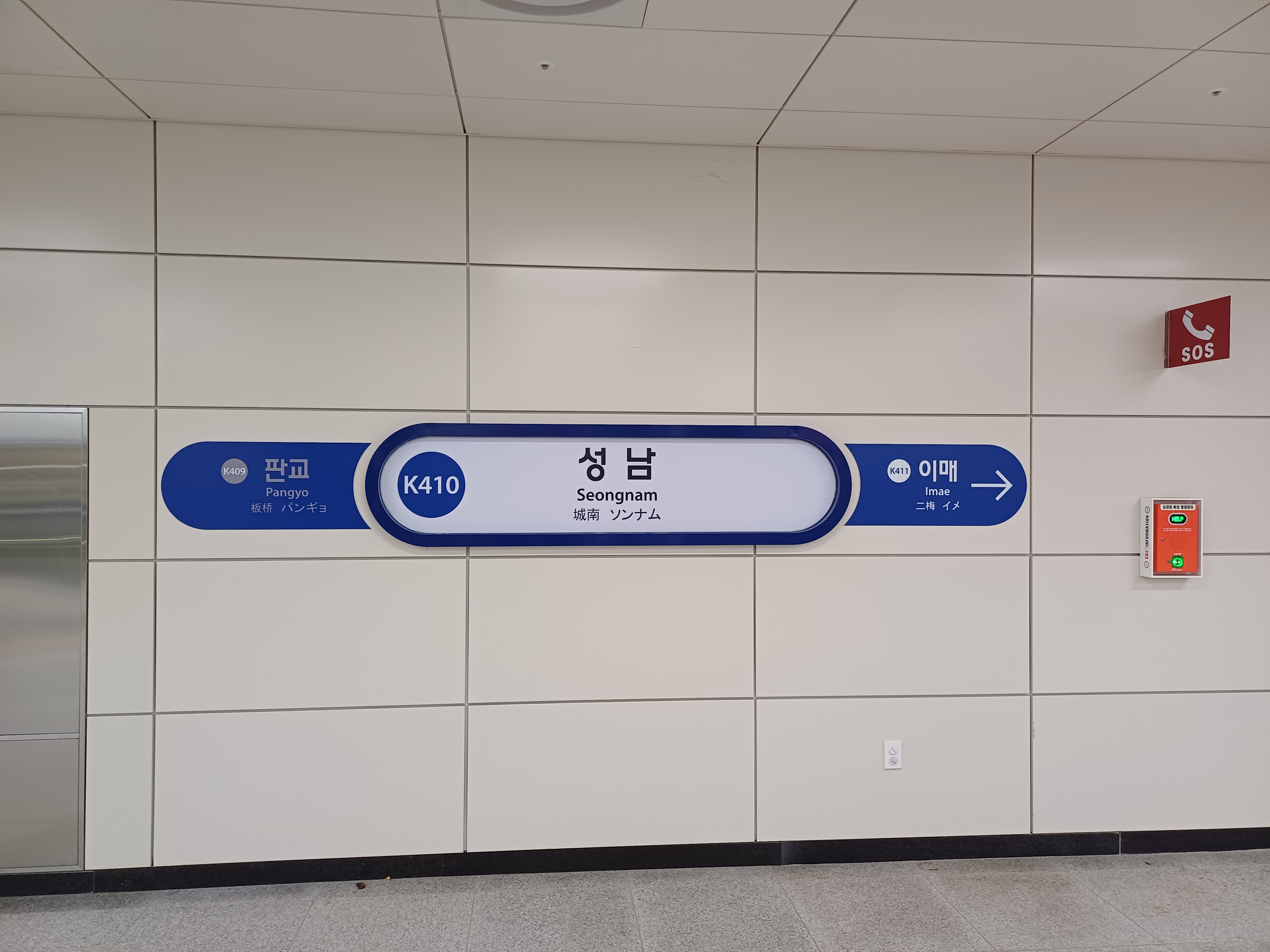
Gyeonggang Line station name sign

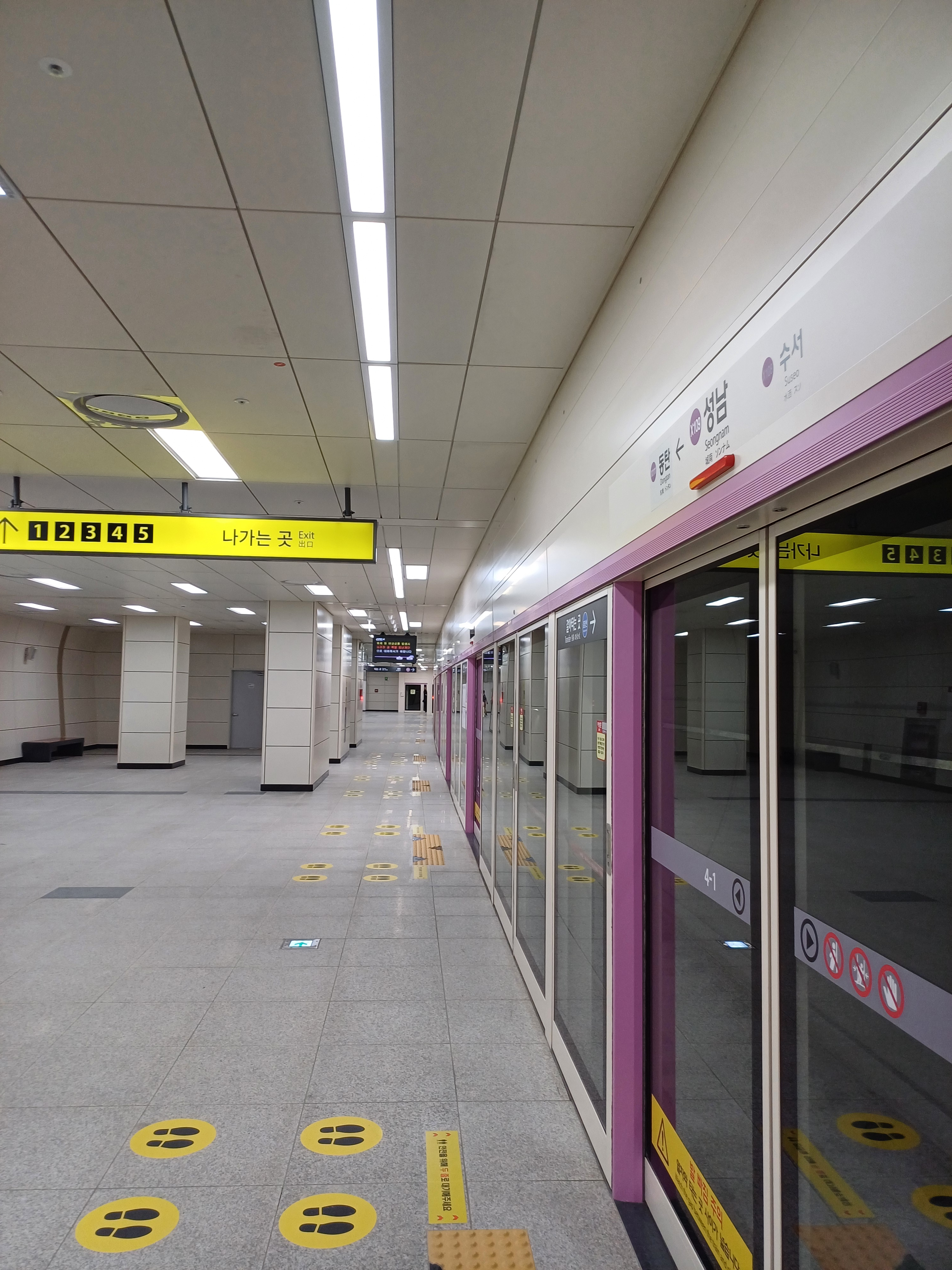
GTX-A platform

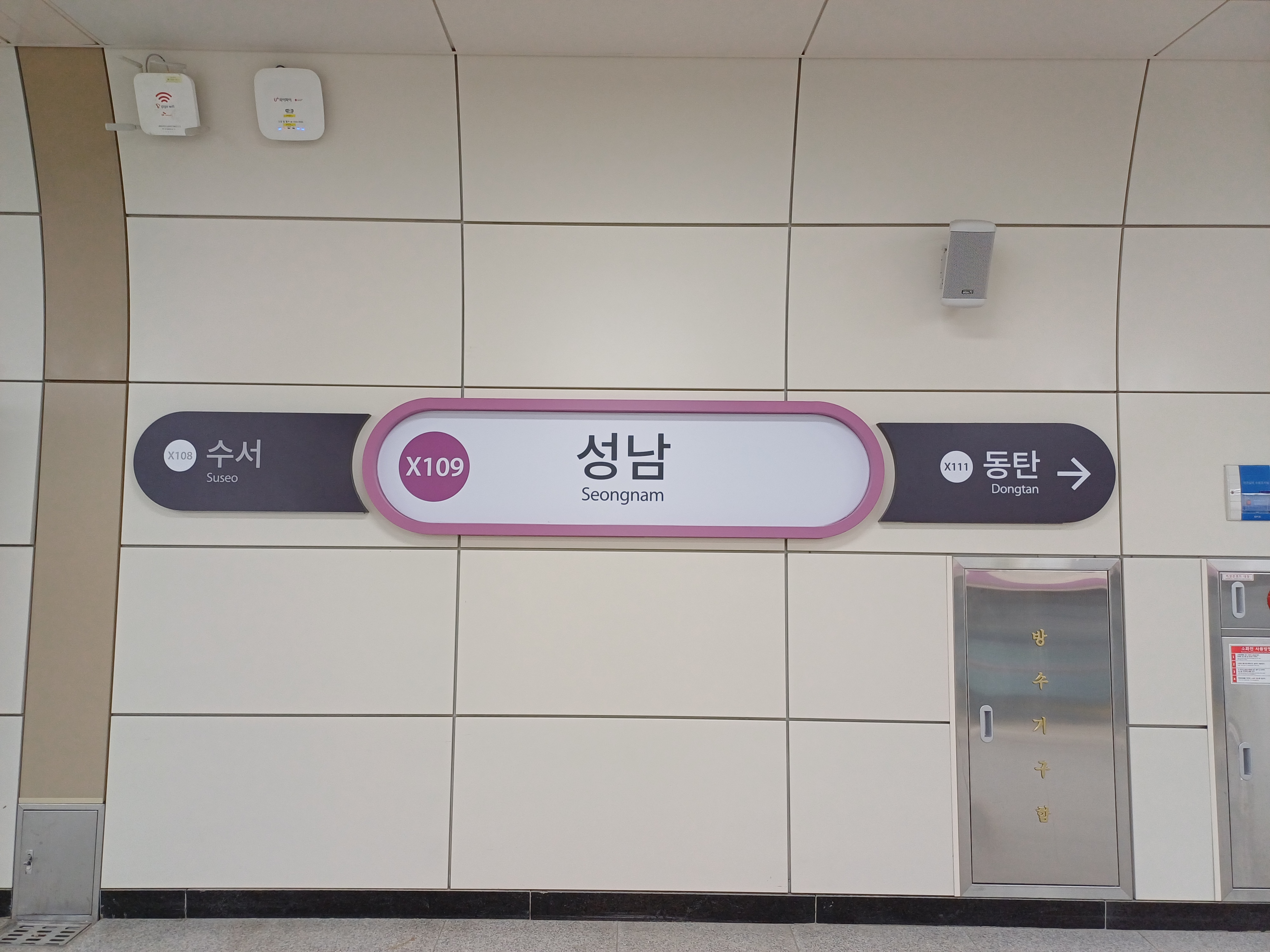
GTX-A station name sign
