= Pangyo station =

Metro station in Seongnam, South Korea

D11
판교 (판교테크노밸리)
Pangyo
(Pangyo Techno Valley)
판교
Pangyo
판교; Pangyo
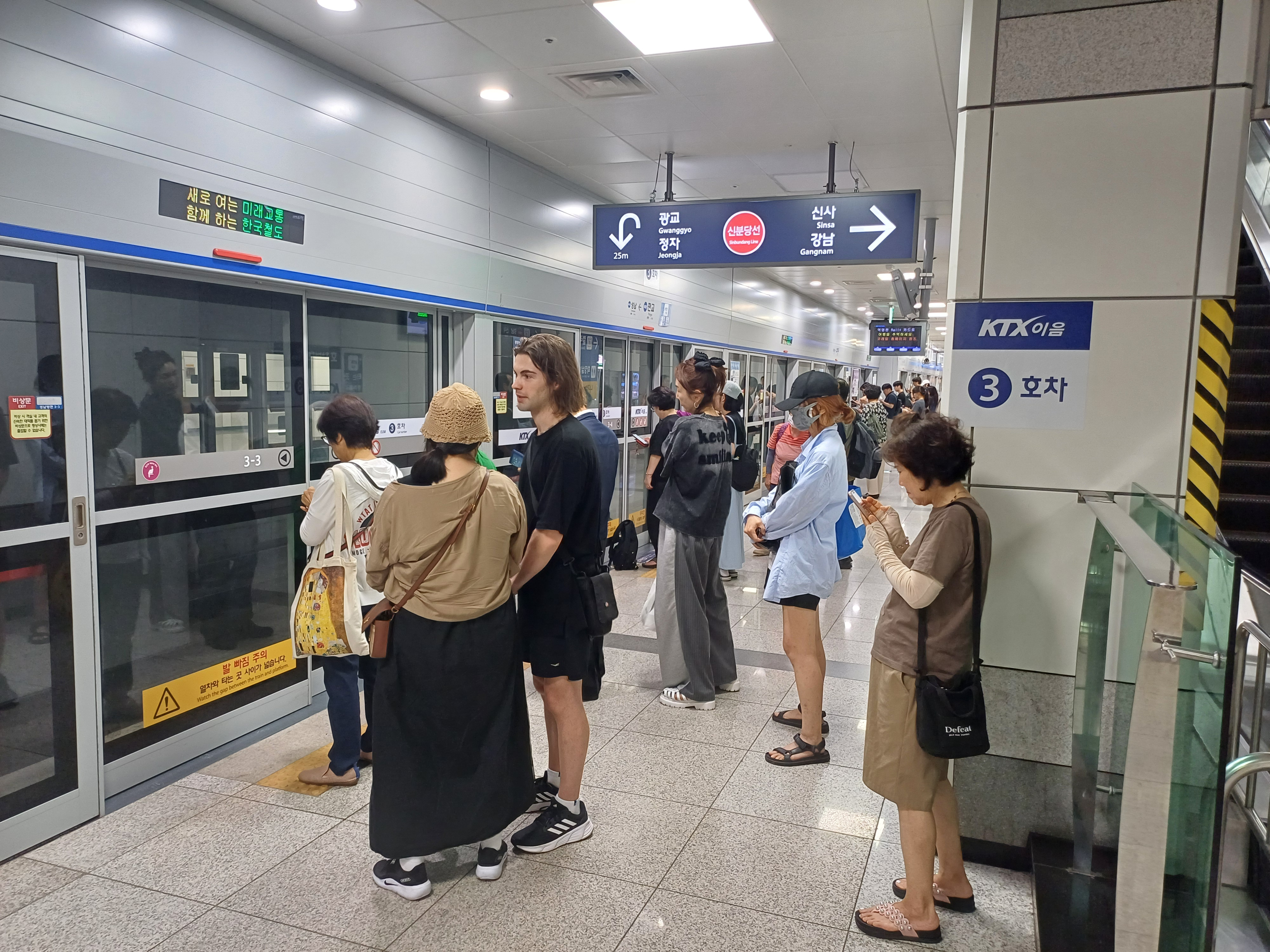
- Platform of the Gyeonggang Line

Korean name
- Hangul: 판교역
- Hanja: 板橋驛
- Revised Romanization: Pangyo-yeok
- McCune–Reischauer: P'an'gyo-yŏk

General information
- Location: B160 Pangyoyeok-ro, Bundang-gu, Seongnam-si; Gyeonggi-do
- Coordinates: 37.394762°N 127.111137°E
- Operator: Shinbundang Railroad Corporation; Korail
- Lines: Shinbundang Line; Gyeonggang Line; Jungbunaeryuk Line
- Platforms: 3
- Tracks: 3

Construction
- Structure type: Underground

Key dates
- October 28, 2011: Shinbundang Line opened
- September 24, 2016: Gyeonggang Line opened
- December 28, 2023: Jungbunaeryuk Line opened

Services
Preceding station	Seoul Metropolitan Subway	Following station
Cheonggyesan towards Sinsa	Shinbundang Line	Jeongja towards Gwanggyo
Terminus	Gyeonggang Line	Seongnam towards Yeoju
Preceding station	Korea Train Express	Following station
Terminus	Jungbunaeryuk KTX	Bubal towards Mungyeong
Location

Pangyo station (Korean: 판교역) is a station on the Shinbundang Line and the Gyeonggang Line, serving the planned district of Pangyo in the city of Seongnam. The station is close to Pangyo Techno Valley, with the subname being named after it, which is one of the country's largest clusters of software, gaming, entertainment and biotechnology businesses, home to major tech companies like Kakao. It began operations on October 28, 2011, with the opening of the Shinbundang Line.

In 2016, it became the western terminus of the Gyeonggang Line. Additionally Pangyo is expected to become the southern terminus of Seoul Subway Line 8 sometime around 2035.

In 2023, the KTX service on the Jungbunaeryuk Line was extended from Bubal to this station.

The station is in close proximity to the Hyundai Department Store Pangyo location, the largest department store in the Seoul Capital Area, which opened in August 2015.

There is a light display between Pangyo Station and Cheonggyesan Station for advertisement. A battery of light emitting vertical bars spans 486 meters in the tunnel. In a train that runs at 90 km/h, these light emitting bars create an illusion of animated picture frames. The system is called eTAS, which stands for Ethernet Tunnel Advertisement System. This was decommissioned by 2022.

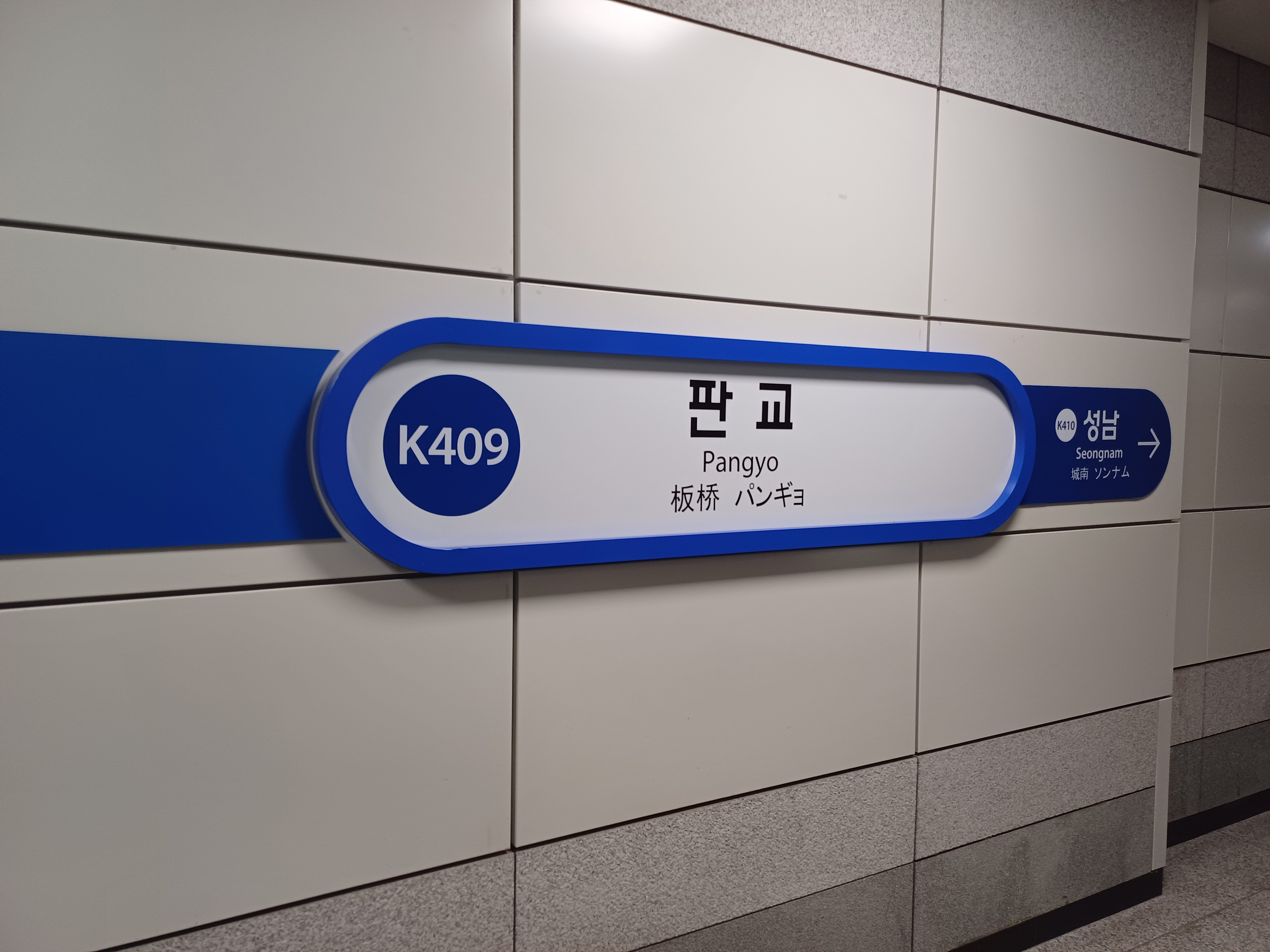
Station name sign (Gyeonggang Line)

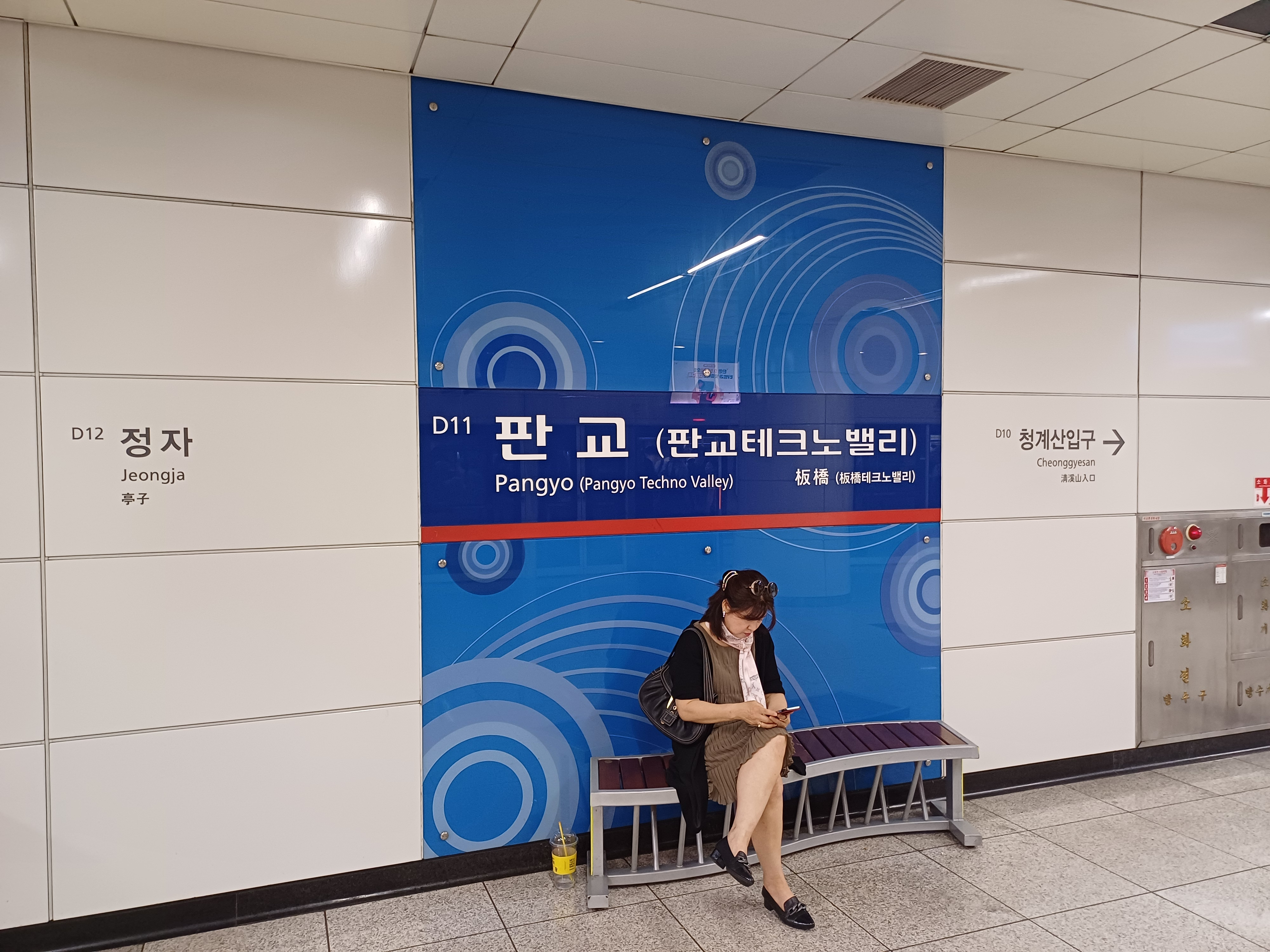
Station name sign (Shinbundang Line)

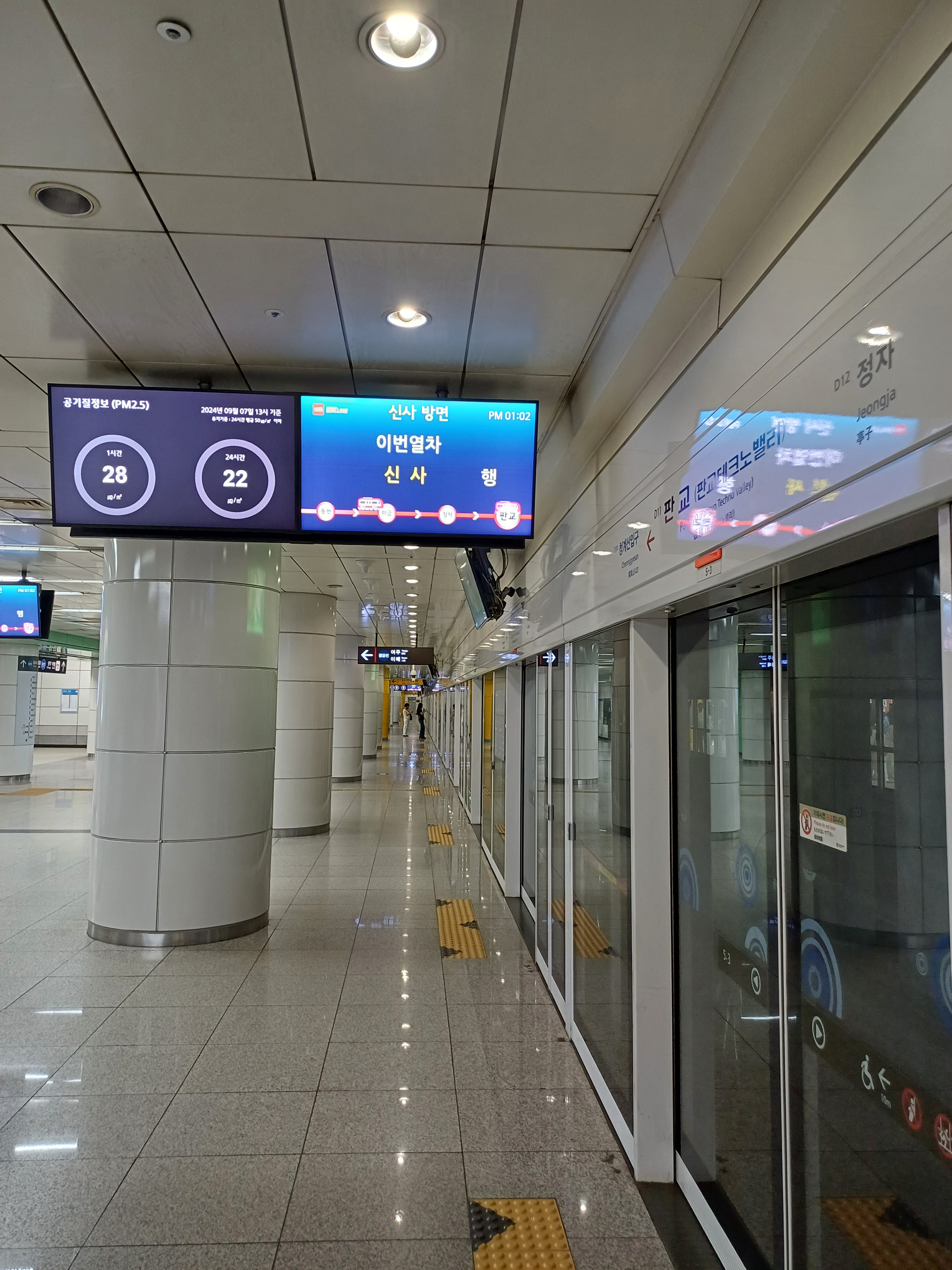
Platform of the Shinbundang Line

== Station layout ==
G	Street level	Exit
L1; Concourse	Lobby	Customer Service, Shops, Vending machines, ATMs
L2; Shinbundang Line Platforms	Side platform, doors will open on the left
L2; Shinbundang Line Platforms	Southbound	Shinbundang Line toward Gwanggyo (Jeongja) →
L2; Shinbundang Line Platforms	Northbound	← Shinbundang Line toward Sinsa (Cheonggyesan)
L2; Shinbundang Line Platforms	Side platform, doors will open on the left
L3; Gyeonggang Line Platforms	Side platform, doors will open on the left
L3; Gyeonggang Line Platforms	Eastbound	Gyeonggang Line toward Yeoju (Seongnam) →
L3; Gyeonggang Line Platforms	Eastbound	Gyeonggang Line toward Yeoju (Seongnam) →
L3; Gyeonggang Line Platforms	Side platform, doors will open on the left
