= Yeoju station =

Station of the Seoul Metropolitan Subway

여주 (여주대); Yeoju (Yeoju Institute of Technology)
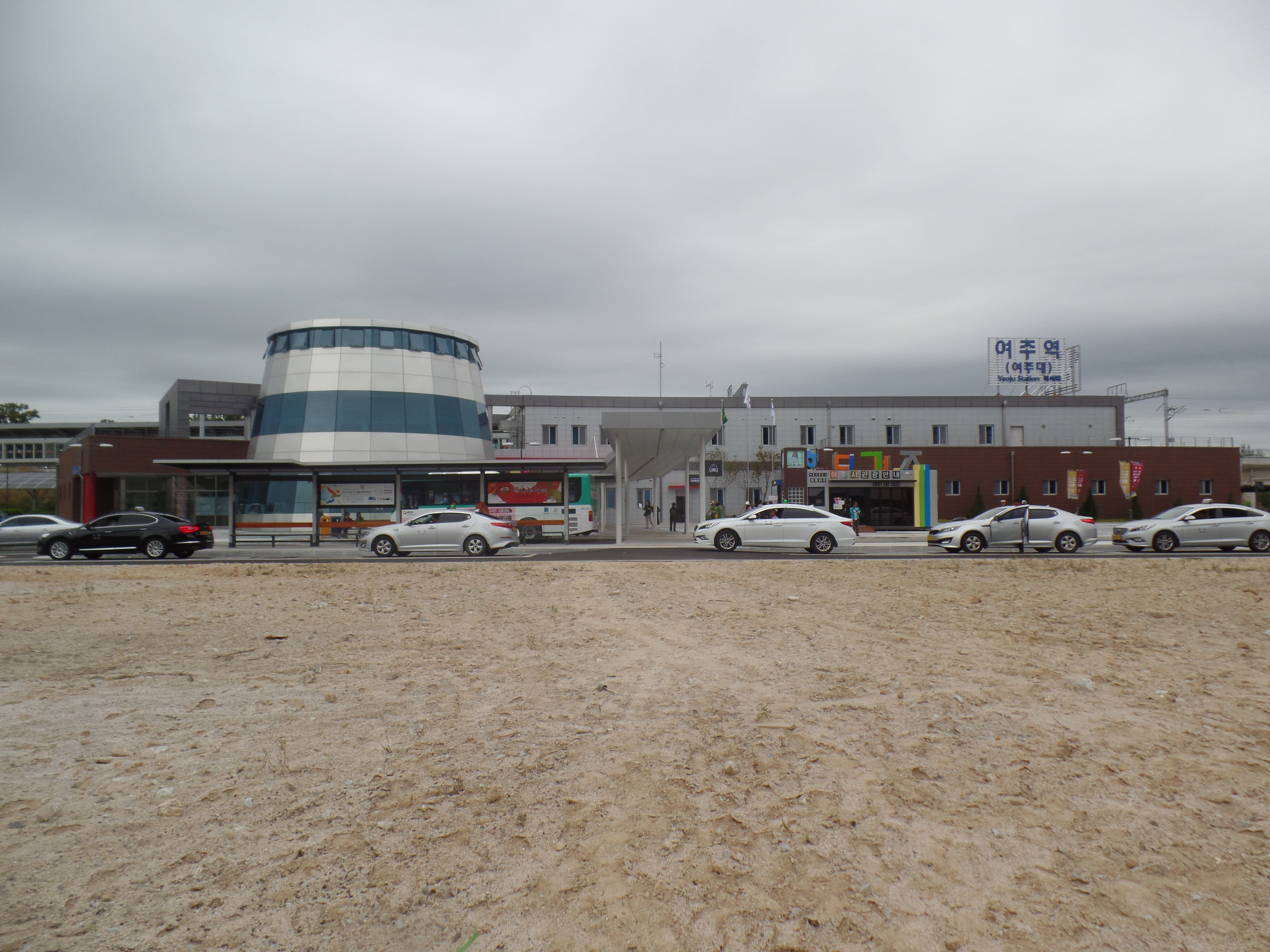
- Yeoju station

Korean name
- Hangul: 여주역
- Hanja: 驪州驛
- RR: Yeoju-yeok
- MR: Yŏju-yŏk

General information
- Location: 80 Gyodongno, Gyo-dong, Yeoju, Gyeonggi
- Coordinates: 37.2829°N 127.6286°E
- Operator: Korail
- Line: Gyeonggang Line
- Platforms: 1
- Tracks: 4

Construction
- Structure type: Aboveground

History
- Opened: September 24, 2016

Services
Preceding station	Seoul Metropolitan Subway	Following station
Sejongdaewangneung towards Pangyo	Gyeonggang Line	Terminus
Location

Yeoju station serves as the southern terminus of the Seoul Metropolitan Subway Gyeonggang Line. It is situated at 80 Gyodongno, Gyo-dong, Yeoju, Gyeonggi, South Korea.

== Gallery ==
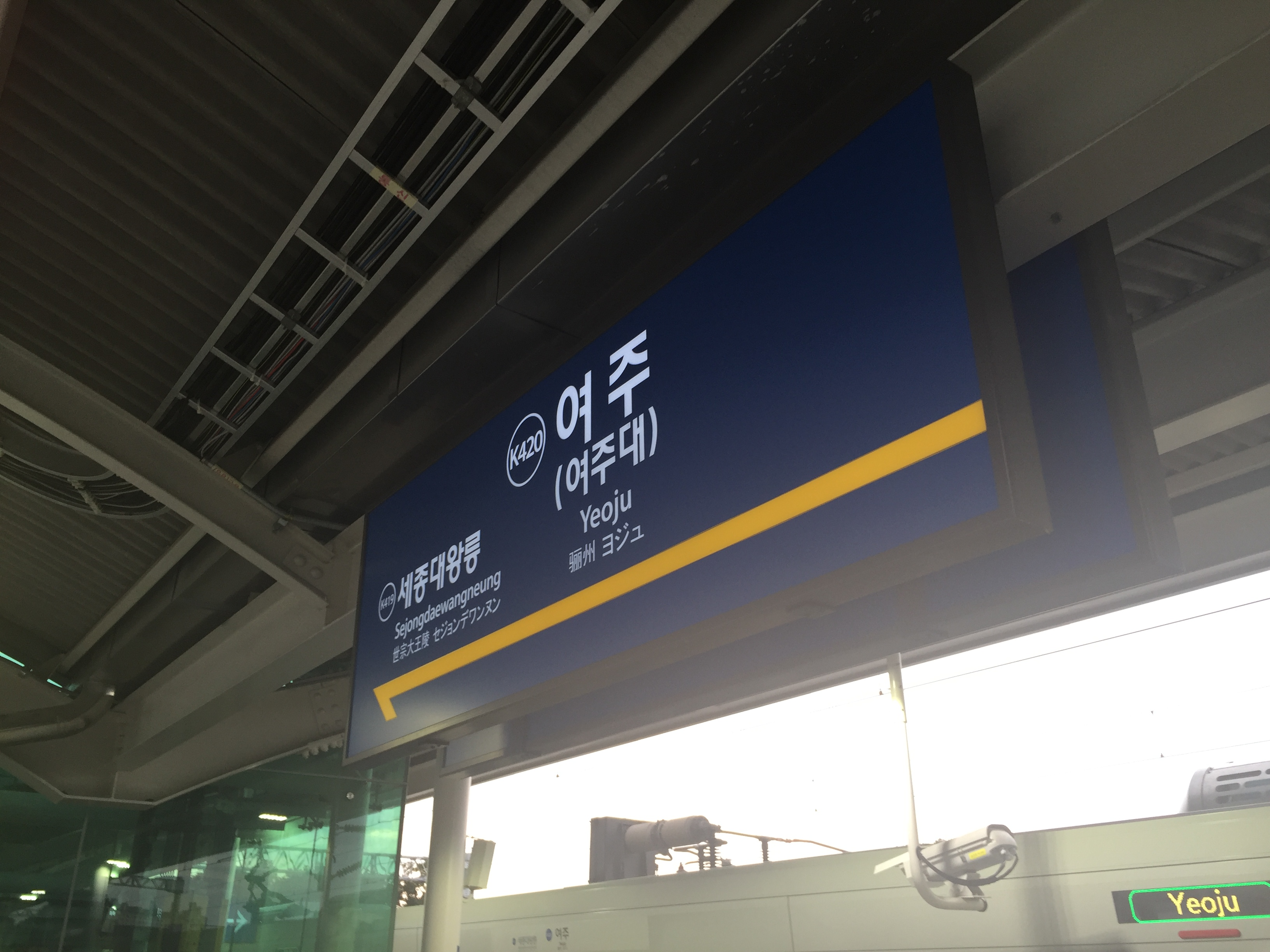
Yeoju station name sign

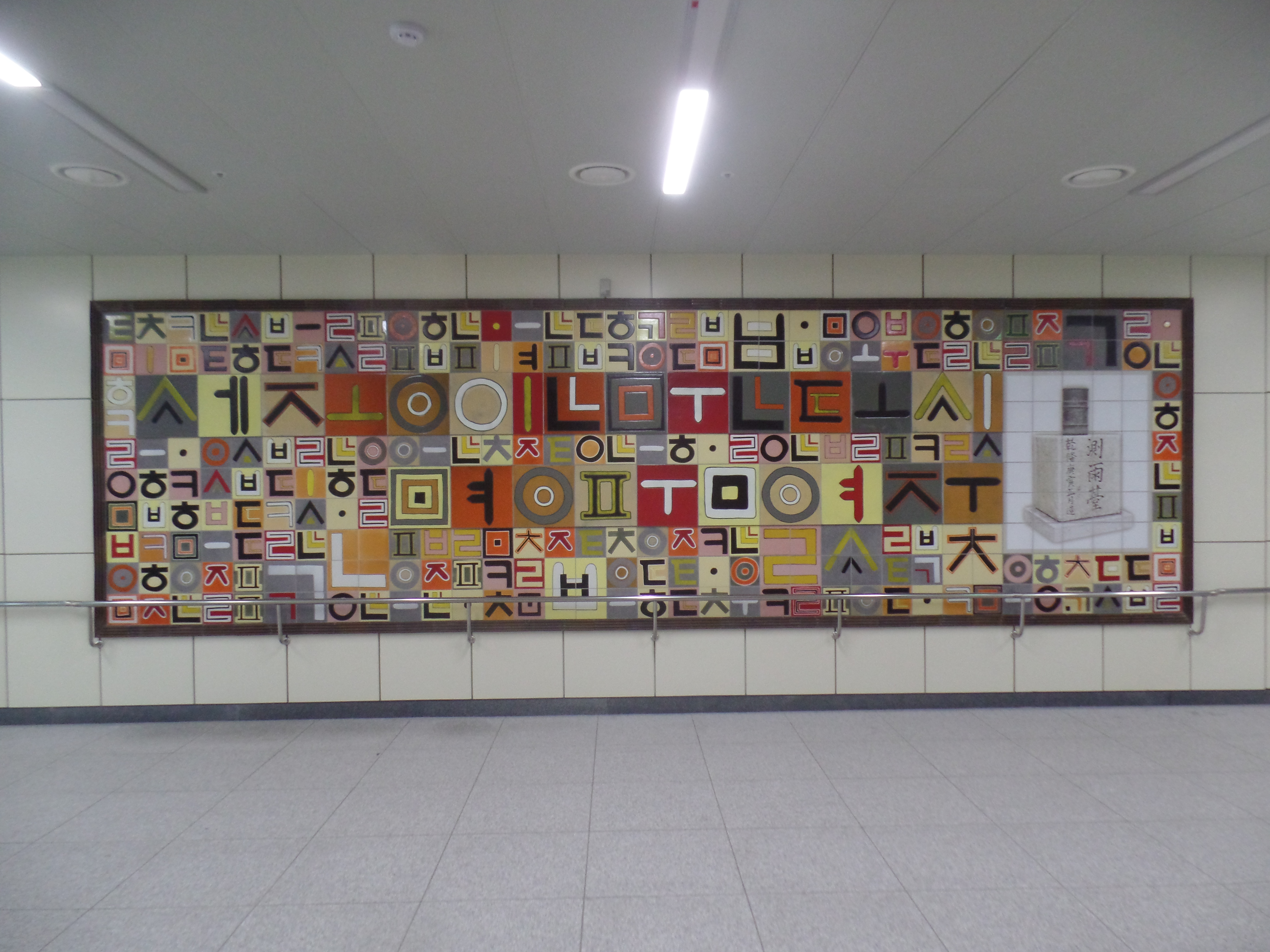
Mural artwork (1)

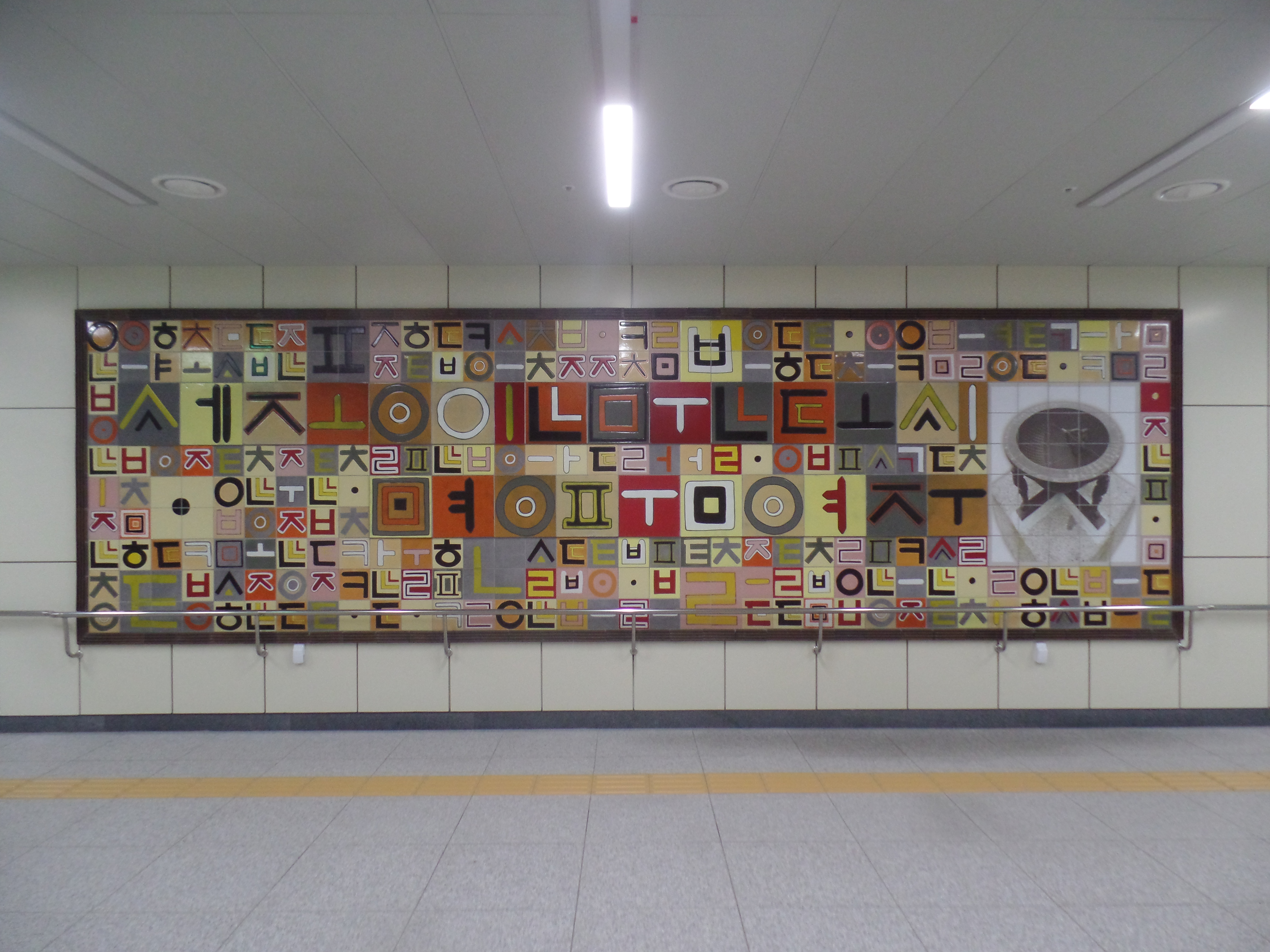
Mural artwork (2)

== Station layout ==
L2; Platforms
L2; Platforms	Southbound	Gyeonggang Line Alighting Passengers Only →
L2; Platforms	Island platform, doors will open on the left
L2; Platforms	Northbound	← Gyeonggang Line toward Pangyo (Sejongdaewangneung)

L1; Concourse	Lobby	Customer Service, Shops, Vending machines, ATMs

G	Street level	Exit
