= Someday (TV series) =

2006 South Korean television series

- Promotional Poster
- Genre: Romance
- Created by: Oh Min-ho
- Written by: Kim Hee-jae
- Directed by: Kim Kyeong-yong; Song Ik-jae (from episode 9)
- Creative directors: Lee Sung-hoon; Park Sung-yong; Kim Sung-hee
- Starring: Bae Doona; Kim Min-jun; Lee Jin-wook; Oh Yoon-ah
- Opening theme: Casker - Someday
- Composer: Jang Seung-joon
- Country of origin: South Korea
- Original language: Korean
- No. of episodes: 16

Production
- Executive producer: Oh Min-ho
- Producer: Ko Dae-jung
- Cinematography: Yoo Jong-soo; Kim Joo-shik (from episode 9)
- Editors: Jang Shi-yun; Lim Hyun-hee
- Camera setup: Single camera
- Running time: 65 min.
- Production company: Yellow Film

Original release
- Network: OCN
- Release: November 11 – December 29, 2006

Someday (Korean: 썸데이) is a 2006 South Korean television series starring Bae Doona, Kim Min-jun, Lee Jin-wook, and Oh Yoon-ah. It aired on cable network OCN at 22:00 every Saturdays and Sundays, starting November 11, 2006, but on November 24, 2006, switched to 23:00 every Friday night. The series has 16 episodes.

== Premise ==
The series revolves around 4 characters: Hana, a successful manga artist who leaves Japan to go back to Korea; Go Jin Pyo, a doctor, and great admirer of Hana's books; Hye Young, a friend of his, who works in animation; and Lim Seok Man, a troubled personality.

== Cast ==
=== Main cast ===
- Bae Doona as Hana Yamaguchi
- Kim Min-jun as Go Jin-pyo
- Lee Jin-wook as Lim Seok-man
- Oh Yoon-ah as Jung Hye-young

=== Supporting ===
Choi Family

- Yoon Won-suk as Choi Jae-deok (Seok-man's friend)
- Lee Eun as Choi Yoon-deok / Sammy (sister)
- Kim Mi-kyung as Ms Choi (mother)
- Kang Shin-il as Mr Choi (father)

Other people

- Jung Young-sook as Ha-na's grandmother
- Ahn Yeo-jin as Sook-hyun (Ha-na's aunt)
- Kim So-ra as Sachiko (Ha-na's friend, Sook Hyun's daughter, 22)
- Shin Goo as Oh Bong-soo (Hye-young's boss)
- Park Dong-bin as Hyung-in (Dr Go's friend, doctor co-worker)
- Song Ji-young as Baek Eun-joo (Dr Go's nurse)
- Oh Jung-se as Seo Jung-joon (private loan collector)
- Ye Soo-jung as Gumiko (Ha-na's Japanese neighbor)
- Jun Sung-hwan as Jun Young-gil (street cleaner)
- Park Joo-hyung
- Lee Moo Saeng

== Production ==
The series was filmed on location in Nagoya (Japan). It is also "the first Korean drama to integrate animation and live action."

== Reception ==
A review of the series stated, "Someday isn't as groundbreaking or original as it initially purports itself to be, but despite all the frustrating aspects I listed, there is still a lot to like here, thanks in large part to the performances of the main cast, an interesting work environment that isn't explored half as much as it should be, and a masterful finale. Personally, I could've done without all the soul-crushing personal tragedy and been happy with a breezy look at the world of manga and anime artists, albeit with a touch of personal discovery and romance ". while DVD Talk found, "For what it is, Someday is a solid drama that has a strong lineup of characters. The four have a good chemistry together and turn a somewhat somber love story into an invigorating and enjoyable viewing experience."

== Broadcast ==
In 2007 the distribution rights were sold for broadcast in Japan.
