= Ha Jae-sook =

South Korean actress (born 1979)

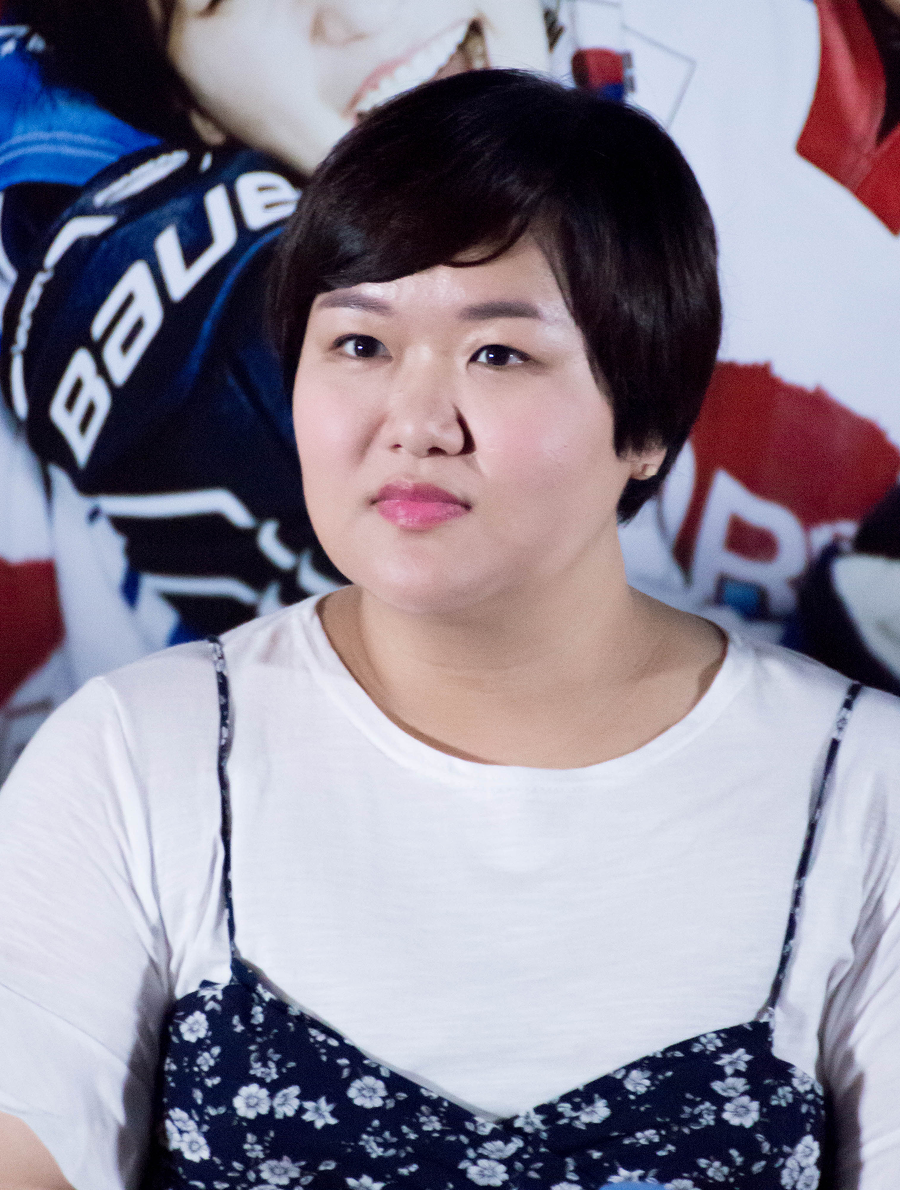
- Ha in 2016
- Born: January 7, 1979 (age 47); Daegu, South Korea
- Occupation: Actress
- Years active: 2000–present
- Agent: Family Actors Entertainment

Korean name
- Hangul: 하재숙
- RR: Ha Jaesuk
- MR: Ha Chaesuk

Ha Jae-sook (Korean: 하재숙; born January 7, 1979) is a South Korean actress. She dropped out of Hankuk University of Foreign Studies to pursue an acting career, and made her theater debut in 2000. After several years on stage, she first appeared onscreen in 2006 as a pro-wrestler in Alone in Love. Ha has continued to play supporting roles in television dramas, notably as the heroine's best friend in Protect the Boss (2011), and an overweight wife who undergoes extensive plastic surgery in Birth of a Beauty (2014).

She married Lee Jun-haeng, a former Special Forces officer, in 2016. The couple has a scuba diving shop in Gangwon-do.

== Filmography ==
=== Television series ===
Year	Title	Role	Notes
2006	Alone in Love	Na Yoo-ri	
2006	How Much Love?	Ah-ra	
2006	Drama City: "The Stars Shine Brightly"	Kang Chang-sook	
2007	Chosun Police	Neung-geom	
2008	Women in the Sun	Park Yong-ja	
2008	Chosun Police 2	Neung-geom	
2009	My Too Perfect Sons	Jo Mi-ran	
2010	Pasta	Lee Hee-joo	
2011	I Believe in Love	Kim Chul-sook	
2011	Protect the Boss	Lee Myung-ran	
2011	Lights and Shadows	Lee Kyung-sook	
2012	Ice Adonis	Kim Young-soon	
2013	My Kids Give Me a Headache	Sun-hwa (guest)	
2013	One Well-Raised Daughter	Jang Ha-myung	
2013	Thrice Married Woman	Heodang fortune teller (guest)	
2014	KBS Drama Special: "Illegal Parking"	Oh Mal-sook	
2014	Birth of a Beauty	Sa Geum-ran	
2015	My Heart Twinkle Twinkle	Chun Eun-bi	
2016	A Beautiful Mind	Jang Moon-kyung	
2016	On the Way to the Airport	Lee Hyun-joo	
2016	Father, I'll Take Care of You	Writer Jo (guest)	
2017	Bravo My Life	Lee Young-hee	
2018	Nice Witch	Heo Min-ji (guest)	
2019	My Absolute Boyfriend	Yeo Woong	
2019	Perfume	Min Jae-Hee	
2021	Revolutionary Sisters	Shin Maria	
2023	King the Land	Police Officer (Ep. 13)	

=== Film ===
Year	Title	Role
2010	The House	Hee-joo (voice)
2012	Miss Conspirator	Young-shim
2014	The Plan Man	Lethargic woman at group session

=== Variety shows ===
Year	Title	Role	Notes/Ref.
2015–2016	Shaolin Clenched Fists	Herself	Fixed cast
2016	Running Man	Herself	Guest; Episode 310, 311 & 313
2017	Happy Together	Herself	Guest; Episode 487
2017	Battle Trip	Herself	Contestant with Han Chae-ah; Episode 48-49
2022	I'm Going to Miss You	Cast Member	

== Theater ==
Year	Title	Role
2000	Don't Ask Me About the Past	
	The Wizard of Oz	
2001	신춘문예해외단막선	
2001	Scripture, Culture - Daejeon	
2001	Queen Esther	
2002	Turandot	
2003	Songshan Nights	
2004	Tunnel	
2004	Padam Padam Padam	
2005	Man of the Moment	
2005	New Boeing-Boeing	
2005	Can't Pay? Won't Pay!	
2006	The Good Body	
2008	Jumderella	Madam
