= Lee Jin-wook =

South Korean actor (born 1981)

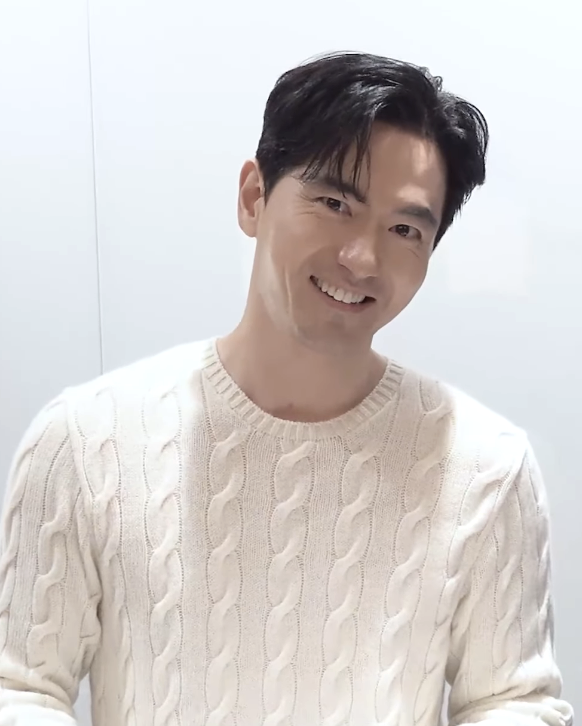
- Lee in July 2024
- Born: September 16, 1981 (age 45); Cheongju, South Korea
- Other name: Lee Jin-uk
- Occupation: Actor
- Years active: 2000–present
- Agent: BH Entertainment

Korean name
- Hangul: 이진욱
- Hanja: 李陣郁
- RR: I Jinuk
- MR: I Chinuk

Lee Jin-wook (Korean: 이진욱; born September 16, 1981) is a South Korean actor. He rose to fame with leading roles in the romance series Glass Castle (2008–2009) and I Need Romance 2012 (2012), before gaining wider recognition with his role in the time-traveling romance series Nine (2013). He then went on to star in the television series The Time We Were Not in Love (2015), crime thriller series Voice (2018–2019), Netflix apocalyptic horror series Sweet Home (2020–2024), and Squid Game (2024–2025). His notable film roles include the comedy Miss Granny (2014) and romantic comedy The Beauty Inside (2015).

== Career ==
=== 2000–2009: Education and career beginnings ===
Lee Jin-wook studied Environmental Engineering at Cheongju University, but made a switch for acting. He began his career in the entertainment industry modelling in commercials. Lee landed his first television acting role in the television dramas, Resurrection, in 2005 and later scored other roles in the television dramas Alone in Love, Someday, Smile Again. Lee achieved commercial success and Hallyu star status after his portrayal as the second male lead in the television series Air City, where he went on to date his co-star Choi Ji-woo for three years. Lee continued to land lead roles playing the president's son in Formidable Rivals, a plastic surgeon in the series Before and After, and a newly married chaebol in Glass Castle. He also made a cameo in The Road Home.

=== 2009–2016: Military enlistment and further success ===
Lee then served his two-year mandatory military service from May 6, 2009, to March 7, 2011, at the Defense Media Agency of the Ministry of National Defense.

After his military discharge in 2011, Lee starred in his comeback project, Myung-wol the Spy where he played a North Korean agent. He then went on to star in the romantic comedy drama I Need Romance 2012 alongside Jung Yu-mi. Lee then landed his most high-profile role yet as a TV anchor named Park Sun-woo in the time-traveling romance Nine alongside Jo Yoon-hee.

After positive reception from his role in Nine, Lee starred in a cinematic film for the first time in 7 years in the 2014 comedy Miss Granny. He then proceeded to land his first major big screen role in the 2014 action film The Target, a remake of the 2010 French action movie Point Blank. After that, Lee reunited with the writer and director of Nine in the television series The Three Musketeers, a period drama set during the Joseon era where he played Crown Prince Sohyeon. He continued to star in big screen films, fantasy romantic comedy The Beauty Inside and the time-travel crime romance Time Renegades. Lee's appearance in The Beauty Inside as Woo-jin garnered headline attention in South Korea at the time of its cinematic release as the scene unveiling him as one of Woo-jin's reincarnations left all female audience members in the theatre exclaiming in awe of his appearance. In South Korean pop culture, it is considered one of the top legendary character unveilings in South Korean cinema. He then returned to the small screen with the South Korean remake of the Taiwanese drama In Time with You, The Time We Were Not in Love alongside Ha Ji-won. In 2016, Lee starred in the crime drama, Goodbye Mr. Black, based on the manga of the same name.

=== 2017–present: Transition in leading roles and reinvention ===
In 2017, Lee was cast in three films – indie films A Tiger in Winter and Road to Utah, and romance thriller High Society.

In 2018, Lee returned to the small screen with successful crime dramas Return, and Voice season 2. The premiere of the second season of Voice set the record for the highest premiere viewership rating for an OCN original drama series. The second season of Voice continued on from the success of the first season, even exceeding first season ratings despite its shorter run. Due to its major success, Voice was picked up for a third season with Lee reprising his role as Do Kang-woo. The third season of Voice continued to be just as successful as the second season.

In 2019, Lee signed an exclusive contract with BH Entertainment, which houses many other top high-profile South Korean actors.

In 2020, Lee starred in Netflix original series Sweet Home, a webtoon-based drama about a secluded teen who lives cooped up in his room, scarred from memories of school violence, and experiences creepy events after moving to an apartment following the loss of his family. It premiered on Netflix Korea on December 18, 2020.

On March 17, 2021, tvN released the full main cast for the drama, Bulgasal: Immortal Souls, with Lee set to star as Dan Hwal, a bulgasal (mythical creature that cannot die or age) who used to be human 600 years ago. The drama aired December 18, 2021, to February 6, 2022, on tvN and was also available for streaming on Netflix.

On April 22, 2021, CJ E&M and TVING revealed the full star-studded cast for the film, A Year-End Medley. The film centers around various people who come to Hotel Emrose, each with stories of their own, building new relationships. A Year-End Medley is directed by Kwak Jae-yong with notable works such as My Sassy Girl and The Classic. Lee starred as Lee Jin-Ho, a plastic surgeon who appears at the hotel's lounge every Saturday night awaiting his fateful love. Filming began on April 19, 2021, and the film was released in theaters and through TVING on December 29, 2021.

On December 8, 2021, it was revealed that Lee would star in the KakaoTV original web drama, Welcome to Wedding Hell, alongside Lee Yeon-hee. Lee played Seo Joon-hyung, a pure-hearted, idealistic groom-to-be, whose nature causes concerns for his soon-to-be wife, Kim Na-eun (played by Lee Yeon-hee), who is described as a realist. This marked Lee's first role in a romantic comedy since 2015 in The Time We Were Not in Love. The web drama aired from May 23 to June 15, 2022, on streaming services, KakaoTV and Netflix.

On June 15, 2022, Netflix confirmed that Lee would reprise his role as Sang Wook in season 1 but as Jung Ui-myeong aka Nam Sang-won in seasons 2 and 3 of Sweet Home. The second season premiered December 1, 2023, on Netflix. Season 3 was released on Netflix July 19, 2024.

On October 18, 2022, it was reported that Lee would be making a special appearance in the upcoming Netflix original drama Doona! starring Bae Suzy and Yang Se-jong.

On June 29, 2023, it was reported that Lee had been cast in the second season of Squid Game alongside, Yim Si-wan, T.O.P, Kang Ha-neul, Jo Yu-ri, Park Sung-hoon and Yang Dong-Geun. This project marked a reunion between him and director Hwang Dong-hyuk of Miss Granny. The second season was released on Netflix on December 26, 2024.

On February 14, 2024, it was confirmed that Lee would be returning to the big screen with the film Dark Nuns alongside Song Hye-kyo, Jeon Yeo-been, Huh Joon-ho, and Moon Woo-jin. Dark Nuns is a spin-off of the 2015 hit film The Priests and will be directed by Kwon Hyuk-jae. Lee is set to star as Father Paolo, a priest and psychiatrist who believes that medicine can cure a young boy possessed by a powerful evil spirit. Filming began on February 22, 2024. The film is slated for release on January 24, 2025.

On April 29, 2024, ENA confirmed that Lee would be starring in their upcoming romance drama Dear Hyeri alongside Shin Hye-sun. Lee will take on the role of Jung Hyun-oh, star announcer and ex-boyfriend of Joo Eun-ho (played by Shin Hye-sun). The show premiered on September 23, 2024.

== Personal life ==
=== Ancestry ===
During a 2014 interview of Lee's role in The Three Musketeers, he confirmed he was descended of Jeonju Yi clan, through the lineage of Prince Milseong, who was the 12th son of King Sejong, and a younger half-brother of King Sejo.

=== Relationships ===
After starring together in the 2007 South Korean television series, Air City, Lee went on to date his co-star Choi Ji-woo for three years from 2009 to 2011. The pair cited excessive public and media attention as one of the reasons for their split.

In May 2014, Lee was spotted out several times with actress Gong Hyo-jin and it was later confirmed by both their agencies that the pair were dating. However, three months after the confirmation of their dating news, it was revealed that the pair had broken-up.

=== Legal issues ===
In July 2016, a woman in her 30s accused Lee of sexual assault, alleging that he forced her to have sex at her apartment. Lee denied the claim, stating that the encounter was consensual, and later filed a countersuit for false accusation. During the police investigation, Lee's DNA was found on clothing submitted by the accuser. After reviewing the evidence, police concluded that there was insufficient proof to support the sexual assault claim and cleared Lee of charges. The accuser was then sent to prosecutors on suspicion of making a false accusation.

In June 2017, the Seoul Central District Court acquitted the accuser of false accusation charges during the first trial, ruling that prosecutors had failed to prove that the claim was intentionally false. The court noted that it was difficult to determine whether clear consent had been given. The case continued after prosecutors appealed the ruling. In February 2018, the Seoul High Court overturned the earlier decision and found the woman guilty of false accusation. She was sentenced to eight months in prison with a two year suspension.

== Filmography ==
=== Film ===
Year	Title	Role	Notes	Ref.
2004	My New Boyfriend	Boyfriend	Short film	
2014	Miss Granny	Han Seung-woo		
2014	The Target	Lee Tae-joon		
2015	The Beauty Inside	Kim Woo-jin		
2015	Time Renegades	Gun-woo		
2018	A Tiger in Winter	Gyeong-yu		
2018	High Society	Shin Ji-ho		
2018	Road to Utah	K		
2021	A Year-End Medley	Lee Jin-ho		
2025	Dark Nuns	Father Paolo		
2025	Seven O'Clock Breakfast Club for the Brokenhearted	Lee Ji-hoon		
TBA	Tygo	Arman Choi		

=== Television series ===
Year	Title	Role	Notes	Ref.
2004	MBC Best Theater "Bad Girl"			
2005	Resurrection	The real Steven Lee	Bit part; Ep. 23	
2006	Alone in Love	Min Hyun-joong		
2006	Smile Again	Yoon Jae-myung		
2006	Someday	Im Seok-man		
2007	Air City	Kang Ha-joon		
2008	Before and After: Plastic Surgery Clinic	Han Geon-soo		
2008	Powerful Opponents	Kang Soo-ho		
2008–2009	Glass Castle	Kim Joon-sung		
2009	The Road Home	Lee Jin-wook	Cameo (Ep. 21–22)	
2011	Spy Myung-wol	Choi Ryu		
2012	I Need Romance 2012	Yoon Seok-hyun		
2013	Nine	Park Sun-woo		
2014	The Three Musketeers	Crown Prince Sohyeon		
2015	The Time We Were Not in Love	Choi Won		
2016	Goodbye Mr. Black	Cha Ji-won		
2018	Return	Dokgo Young		
2018–2019	Voice	Do Kang-woo	Season 2–3	
2020–2024	Sweet Home	Pyeon Sang-wook	Season 1–3	
2021–2022	Bulgasal: Immortal Souls	Dan Hwal		
2022	Welcome to Wedding Hell	Seo Jun-hyung		
2023	Doona!	Park In-wook	Cameo	
2024	Dear Hyeri	Jung Hyun-Oh		
2024–2025	Squid Game	Park Gyeong-seok (Player 246)	Season 2–3	
2025	Beyond the Bar	Yoon Seok-hoon		

=== Television shows ===
Year	Title	Role	Notes	Ref.
2007	I ♡ Broadway	Host		

=== Music video appearances ===
Year	Title	Artist	Ref.
2002	"In Case of My Love"	Jung Jae-hyung	
2004	"Misty Moon"	Lim Hyung-joo	
2004	"Grabber"	Kim Dong-ryool and Lee So-eun	
2005	"Doo roo roo"	Ahn Jae-wook	
2009	"My Love"	Shin Seung-hun	
2023	"Lips"	Heize	

== Awards and nominations ==
Name of the award ceremony, year presented, category, nominee of the award, and the result of the nomination
Award ceremony	Year	Category	Nominee / Work	Result	Ref.
APAN Star Awards	2013	Excellence Award, Actor	Nine	Nominated	
Korea Drama Awards	2008	Netizen Popularity Award	Glass Castle	Nominated	
Korea Drama Awards	2013	Best Couple Award	Lee Jin-wook (with Jo Yoon-hee); Nine	Nominated	
Korea Drama Awards	2013	Grand Prize (Daesang)	Nine	Nominated	
Korea Film Actors Association Awards	2016	Grand Prize	Time Renegades	Won	
Mnet 20's Choice Awards	2013	20's Drama Star - Male	Nine	Won	
SBS Drama Awards	2006	New Star Award	Alone in Love / Smile Again	Won	
SBS Drama Awards	2008	Excellence Award, Actor in a Serial Drama	Glass Castle	Nominated	
SBS Drama Awards	2015	Best Couple Award	Lee Jin-wook (with Ha Ji-won); The Time We Were Not in Love	Nominated	
SBS Drama Awards	2015	Netizen Popularity Award	The Time We Were Not in Love	Nominated	
SBS Drama Awards	2015	Top Excellence Award, Actor in a Miniseries	The Time We Were Not in Love	Nominated	
SBS Drama Awards	2018	Top Excellence Award, Actor in a Wednesday-Thursday Drama	Return	Nominated	
