= Welcome to Wedding Hell =

2022 South Korean web series

- Promotional poster
- Hangul: 결혼백서
- Hanja: 結婚白書
- Lit.: Marriage White Paper
- RR: Gyeolhonbaekseo
- MR: Kyŏrhonbaeksŏ
- Genre: Romantic drama
- Developed by: Kakao Entertainment
- Written by: Choi I-rang
- Directed by: Seo Joo-wan; Song Je-young
- Starring: Lee Jin-wook; Lee Yeon-hee; Kil Yong-woo; Yoon Yoo-sun
- Country of origin: South Korea
- Original language: Korean
- No. of episodes: 12

Production
- Running time: 34–44 minutes
- Production company: Mays Entertainment

Original release
- Network: KakaoTV
- Release: May 23 – June 15, 2022

Welcome to Wedding Hell (Korean: 결혼백서) is a 2022 South Korean streaming television series directed by Song Je-young and Seo Joo-wan, and starring Lee Jin-wook, Lee Yeon-hee, Yoon Yoo-sun and Kil Yong-woo. This KakaoTV original series is a 12-episode romance that depicts the process of preparing for marriage between a couple in their 30s. The first episode was released on May 23, 2022, on KakaoTV, a new episode was released every Monday, Tuesday, and Wednesday at 19:00 (KST) for four weeks. It is available for streaming in selected territories on Netflix.

== Synopsis ==
A couple in their 30s is preparing for their wedding day. Their dream was to have a fairytale event. Facing the reality of organizing the big day shatters their dream.

== Cast ==
=== Main ===
- Lee Jin-wook as Seo Jun-hyung, pre-marriage groom.
- Lee Yeon-hee as Kim Na-eun, pre-marriage bride.

=== Supporting ===
==== Parents of Jun-hyung ====
- Kil Yong-woo as Seo Jong-soo, father of Jun-hyung, an executive at a large corporation.
- Yoon Yoo-sun as Park Mi-sook, mother of Jun-hyung, a housewife and a strong wife's force.

==== Parents of Na-eun ====
- Im Ha-ryong as Kim Soo-chan, Na-eun's father, running a real estate brokerage business with his wife.
- Kim Mi-kyung as Lee Dal-yeong, Na-eun's mother, running a real estate brokerage business with her husband.

==== Co-workers and friends of couple ====
- Hwang Seung-eon as Choi Hee-seon, a senior at Na-eun's company with a bubbly wit.
- Song Jin-woo as Jang Min-woo, best friend of Jun-hyung.
- Kim Ju-yeon as Lee Soo-yeon, a co-worker of Na-eun.

== Production ==
In December 2021, Lee Jin-wook was confirmed to play protagonist of KakaoTV's original series. On April 21, first script reading scenes were released with major cast members and directors Song Je-young and Seo Joo-wan.

== Episodes ==
No.	Title	Directed by	Written by	Original release date
1	"First Pitch"	Seo Joo-wan	Choi I-rang	May 23, 2022
Seo Jun-hyung and Kim Na-eun has been dating for the last 2 years. Once while taking an evening stroll together Na-eun spots an old married couple and other married couples merrily enjoying life. Next day, she attends a wedding ceremony with her friends Choi Hee-seon and Lee Soo-yeon. This all inclines her to go for marriage. She tries to raise conversation of marriage with Jun-hyung, but he seems to avoid it. Actually Jun-hyung planned a surprise marriage proposal to Na-eun in a yacht to make it a memorable event. Na-eun accepts the proposal despite initial shock.
2	"Missed Sign"	Seo Joo-wan	Choi I-rang	May 24, 2022
Hee-seon tells Na-eun that the meeting of the couple's parents is the first step in a marriage. Jun-hyung finds the restaurant, so they set the date for next week. When Na-eun informs her parents, her mum jumps into action, to her, the first meeting is akin to warfare, and she resolves to make the first blow. The night before the meeting, Na-eun worried about their mum's reactions, devises a series of signs akin to the signs in baseball to allow the couple to turn the topics during meeting and diffuse any arising tension. As the parents meet, Jun-hyung convinces them to leave the wedding planning to the couple themselves. The couple is confident that the worst is over but Na-eun's mum, hopes that the couple has taken care of finance and cost of wedding. Her husband assures her that they will figure it out.
3	"Drag Bunt"	Seo Joo-wan	Choi I-rang	May 25, 2022
4	"Outfield Fly Ball"	Seo Joo-wan	Choi I-rang	May 30, 2022
5	"Relief Pitcher"	Seo Joo-wan	Choi I-rang	May 31, 2022
Title reference: Relief pitcher
6	"Beanball"	Seo Joo-wan	Choi I-rang	June 1, 2022
The episode starts with a shopping trip. Jun-hyung accompanies his mother as she buys wedding gifts and he begins to suspect her of buying expensive gifts to flaunt their status. In spite of her denial she asks a store assistant to leave a price tag on mink coat. Na-eun's friends wait with her at her parents' for viewing gifts. As they unwrap gifts, they find luxury item after luxury item. Na-eun and her parents are happy until they see the tag which reads 20,000,000 won. The next morning, Na-eun's mother gives her a bank book showing the balance being 50,000,000 won to spend it all on wedding gifts. Na-eun visits Jun-hyung's parents' apartment. There she follows her mother-in-law to the kitchen to help her. Her mother-in-law notices how uncomfortable Na-eun is, she pretends that the tag was supposed to be the brand tag not the price tag and it was company's mistake. She tells Na-eun not to feel pressured for the gifts. The episode ends with Jun-hyung wondering after seeing text from Hui-seon to Na-eun that the total estimate cost of the wedding gifts she received is around 80 million won. Title reference: Beanball
7	"Error"	Seo Joo-wan	Choi I-rang	June 6, 2022
8	"Ground into Double Play"	Seo Joo-wan	Choi I-rang	June 7, 2022
9	"Bench-Clearing Brawl"	Seo Joo-wan	Choi I-rang	June 8, 2022
Title reference: Bench-clearing brawl
10	"Suspended Game"	Seo Joo-wan	Choi I-rang	June 13, 2022
Title reference: Suspended game
11	"Home Run"	Seo Joo-wan	Choi I-rang	June 14, 2022
Title reference: Home run
12	"Reaching Home Plate"	Seo Joo-wan	Choi I-rang	June 15, 2022

== Original soundtrack ==
Welcome to Wedding Hell

Soundtrack album by Various
- Released: 2022
- Genre: Soundtrack
- Languages: Korean; English
- Labels: Kakao Entertainment; Mace Entertainment

=== Part 1 ===
Released on May 25, 2022
No.	Title	Lyrics	Music	Artist	Length
1.	"Springtime Carol (Marry ME)" (봄날의 캐럴 (Marry ME))	Kim Ho-kyung	1601 (Jeong Seung-hyun, Park Tae-hyun)	Han Seung-yoon	3:30
2.	"Springtime Carol (Marry ME)" (Inst.)				3:30

=== Part 2 ===
Released on June 1, 2022
No.	Title	Lyrics	Music	Artist	Length
1.	"To the Bride" (신부에게)	Lee Se-jun	Park Seung-hwa	Ailee	4:18
2.	"To the Bride" (Inst.)				4:18
