= Merry Mary =

2007 South Korean television series

- Promotional poster
- Also known as: Me-ri vs. Dae-gu's Attack and Defense Battle; Mary Daegu Bout
- Hangul: 메리대구 공방전
- RR: Meridaegu gongbangjeon
- MR: Meridaegu kongbangjŏn
- Genre: Romance; Comedy
- Written by: Kim In-young
- Directed by: Go Dong-sun
- Starring: Lee Ha-na; Ji Hyun-woo; Lee Min-woo; Wang Bit-na
- Country of origin: South Korea
- Original language: Korean
- No. of episodes: 16

Production
- Production location: South Korea
- Running time: Wednesdays and Thursdays at 21:55 (KST)

Original release
- Network: Munhwa Broadcasting Corporation
- Release: May 16 – July 5, 2007

Merry Mary (Korean: 메리대구 공방전; RR: Meridaegu gongbangjeon) is a 2007 South Korean television series starring Lee Ha-na, Ji Hyun-woo, Lee Min-woo, Wang Bit-na, and Lee Young-ha. It aired on MBC from May 16 to July 5, 2007, on Wednesdays and Thursdays at 21:55 for 16 episodes.

== Cast ==
=== Main characters ===
- Lee Ha-na – Hwang Me-ri
- Ji Hyun-woo – Kang Dae-gu
- Lee Min-woo – Seo Do-jin
- Wang Bit-na – Lee So-ra
- Lee Young-ha – Park Heung-bok

=== Supporting characters ===
- Gi Ju-bong – Hwang Do-chul
- Lee Hye-sook – Oh Seung-ja
- Ahn Yeon-hong – Jang Eun-ja
- Lee Byung-joon

=== Additional cast members ===
- Kim Hye-jung – Kim Bu-gil
- Kim Joo-young – Hwang Dae-han
- Lee Joo-hyun
- Jang Jung-hee
- Kim Yong-hee
- Kim Mi-so
- Moon Ga-young
- Song Young-kyu
- Park Yoon-bae
- Seulgi

== Original soundtrack ==
No.	Title	Artist	Length
1.	"메리대구 공방전 Title"	Various Artists	1:12
2.	"One and One"	Ji Hyun-woo	3:52
3.	"그대 혼자일 때" (When You Are Alone)	Lee Ha-na	4:40
4.	"내 맘대로"	승훈	3:07
5.	"Remember (Drama Ver.)"	The Melody	3:02
6.	"Sweet (Drama Ver.)"	파니핑크	4:43
7.	"돌아오라 소렌토로"	Lee Young-ha	2:06
8.	"백수별곡"	Various Artists	3:11
9.	"Habanera Variation"	Various Artists	3:18
10.	"골목길"	Various Artists	3:05
11.	"서커스"	Various Artists	2:43
12.	"풍운 도사"	Various Artists	3:37
13.	"Welcome To Merry's House"	Various Artists	2:39
14.	"돌아오라 소렌토로 Variation"	Various Artists	3:52

== Awards and nominations ==
Year	Award	Category	Recipient	Result
2007	2007 MBC Drama Awards	New Star Award	Lee Ha-na	Won
