= Case Closed: The Phantom of Baker Street =

2002 film by Kenji Kodama

- Theatrical release poster
- Kanji: 名探偵コナン ベイカー街(ストリート)の亡霊
- Revised Hepburn: Meitantei Konan: Beikā Sutorīto no Bōrei
- Directed by: Kenji Kodama
- Written by: Hisashi Nozawa
- Based on: Case Closed by Gosho Aoyama
- Produced by: Masahito Yoshioka; Michihiko Suwa
- Starring: Minami Takayama; Kappei Yamaguchi; Akira Kamiya; Wakana Yamazaki; Megumi Hayashibara; Hideyuki Tanaka; Ai Orikasa; Megumi Ogata; Yukiko Iwai; Ikue Ohtani; Wataru Takagi; Hiroaki Hirata; Mitsuki Saiga; Kenichi Ogata; Chafurin; Kiyoshi Kobayashi
- Music by: Katsuo Ōno
- Production company: TMS Entertainment
- Distributed by: Toho
- Release date: April 20, 2002
- Running time: 107 minutes
- Country: Japan
- Language: Japanese
- Box office: ¥ 3.4 billion (US$ 34.4 million)

Case Closed: The Phantom of Baker Street, known as Detective Conan: The Phantom of Baker Street (名探偵コナン ベイカー街(ストリート)の亡霊, Meitantei Konan: Beikā Sutorīto no Bōrei) in Japan, is the 2002 Japanese animated science fiction mystery film and the sixth Case Closed feature film, released in Japan on April 20, 2002. The Phantom of Baker Street is the first film in the series written by Hisashi Nozawa. This was the last of the Case Closed films done in cel animation. It was released on February 16, 2010, in the United States on DVD. This film brought 3.4 billion yen in the box office. The story features several characters from and references to the Sherlock Holmes series, which Detective Conan is heavily inspired by, and Jack the Ripper.

== Plot ==
Child prodigy Hiroki Sawada — who, by the age of ten, is already a MIT grad student and has developed a DNA Tracker software—has been under the guardianship of Thomas Schindler, CEO of the software giant Schindler, Inc., since his parents have died. One night, in a heavily guarded room at the top of the Schindler building where Hiroki lives, he finishes an artificial intelligence system called Noah's Ark and sends the software through the telephone lines. The guards become suspicious when he does not respond. They bust open the door, but discover that Hiroki has disappeared, apparently having leapt off the building.

Two years later, Schindler, Inc. holds a demonstration of an immersive virtual reality game called Cocoon. Conan Edogawa, Richard and Rachel Moore and the Junior Detective League (including Vi Graythorn) are attending the demonstration, but cannot participate without special badges, which have been allocated to children associated with the game's investors and prominent socialites such as Serena Sebastian. Dr. Agasa and Conan's (Jimmy Kudo's) father Booker, who have been involved in the development of the game's setting, attend the event.

Agasa gives Conan a badge while the Junior Detective League trade Premium Golden Masked Yaiber Cards for badges. When security discovers that Kashimura, a top employee of Schindler, Inc., has been killed, Booker and Conan rush to investigate. Discovering that Kashimura's keyboard has blood stains on three of the keys (J, T, and R), Conan decides to participate in the demonstration, hoping that the game would lead him to an answer. Booker reasons out that J-T-R stands for "Jack the Ripper".

When the demonstration begins, Noah's Ark announces it has taken control, but it tells the audience that if none of the fifty people are able to survive the game, it will kill the players in reality using a large electromagnetic burst. The players must choose one of five types of games while the audience watch helplessly, unable to shut the game down. Conan, Rachel and the Junior Detective League choose the fifth named All-Time London, a re-creation 19th century London set in the world of Sherlock Holmes. Conan and his friends track down 221B Baker Street, only to find that Sherlock Holmes and Dr. Watson are at Dartmoor. Since Holmes cannot help, the children find Sebastian Moran and professor James Moriarty.

Moriarty tells Conan that he trained Jack when he was a street urchin and gives the children a clue about the next victim, who turns out to be Irene Adler, an early client of Holmes. Some of the events lead to more players being eliminated from the game, including the Junior Detective League. Eventually only three are left: Conan, Rachel, and another player named Hideki Moroboshi. They follow Jack to a train and reveals Jack to be among the passengers. However, Jack abducts Rachel and sets the train on a runaway course.

After being unable to stop the train, Conan and Hideki confront Jack on top of the train where he has tied himself to Rachel. Hoping that Conan can figure out the situation, Rachel sacrifices herself by jumping off the train and into a ravine, pulling Jack with her. As Conan begins to lose hope, Holmes appears and gives Conan some useful advice that eventually helps Conan and Hideki survive the game when the train crashes into the station. Meanwhile in the real world, Booker investigates the case and reveals that Kashimura's murderer is Schindler, who Hiroki had discovered was a descendant of the original Jack, leading Schindler gets arrested.

After winning the game, Conan reveals that "Hideki" is actually the avatar of Hiroki, who has manifested himself as Noah's Ark. In a private conversation, Hiroki says he was satisfied with the outcome, as he was hoping the children can paint a brighter future than their parents and that he was happy he could also participate as a player in the game. He releases the players, Junior Detective League and Rachel from the game and then erases himself, while the real Hideki has no memories of the events inside the game.

== Cast ==
Character	Japanese	English
Conan Edogawa	Minami Takayama	Alison Viktorin
Shinichi Kudo/Jimmy Kudo	Kappei Yamaguchi	Jerry Jewell
Kogoro Mouri/Richard Moore	Akira Kamiya	R. Bruce Elliott
Ran Mouri/Rachel Moore	Wakana Yamazaki	Colleen Clinkenbeard
Sonoko Suzuki/Serena Sebastian	Naoko Matsui	Laura Bailey
Dr. Hiroshi Agasa	Kenichi Ogata	Bill Flynn
Yuzaku Kudo/Booker Kudo	Hideyuki Tanaka	John Swasey
Ayumi Yoshida/Amy Yeager	Yukiko Iwai	Monica Rial
Mitsuhiko Tsubiraya/Mitch Tennyson	Ikue Ohtani	Cynthia Cranz
Genta Kojima/George Kaminski	Wataru Takagi	Mike McFarland
Ai Haibara/Vi Graythorn	Megumi Hayashibara	Brina Palencia
Juzo Megure/Joseph Meguire	Chafurin	Mark Stoddard
Ninzaburou Shiratori/Nicholas Santos	Kazuhiko Inoue	Eric Vale
Kazunobu Chiba	Isshin Chiba	Chris Cason
Hiroki Sawada/Noah's Ark	Ai Orikasa	Maxey Whitehead
Akira Emori	Rikako Aikawa	Chris Cason
Sebastian Moran	Yuzuru Fujimoto	Bradley Campbell
Mrs. Hudson	Kei Hayami	Emily Gray
Jack the Ripper	Sho Hayami	Todd Haberkorn
Tadaaki Kashimura	Hiroaki Hirata	Robert McCollum
Professor James Moriarty	Kiyoshi Kobayashi	Steve Powell
Hideki Moroboshi	Megumi Ogata	Luci Christian
Seiichiro Kikukawa	Mitsuki Saiga	Mary Morgan
Irene Adler	Sumi Shimamoto	Melinda Allen
Shinya Takizawa	Urara Takano	Anastasia Muñoz
Thomas Schindler	Masane Tsukayama	Spencer Prokop

== Music ==
The film's theme song is "Everlasting" by B'z. It was released on July 2, 2002, on their album, Green.

The official soundtrack was released on April 17, 2002. It costs ¥3059 including tax.

== Home media ==
=== VHS ===
The VHS of the film was released on April 9, 2006. It was discontinued soon after 2006 as it was switched to DVD.

=== Region 2 DVD ===
The Region 2 DVD was released on September 30, 2005. The DVD includes the film in widescreen and the trailer.

=== Region 1 DVD ===
The Region 1 DVD was released on February 16, 2010, by FUNimation Entertainment. The DVD includes the film with both English dub and Japanese dub with English subtitles.

== Reception ==
In addition to winning third place in the film series request project held on the official website in 2006, Aoyama commented that it was his mother's favorite film. In addition, it won the second place in the popularity poll of 19 successive films held in 2016.

Carlo Santos of Anime News Network commended the film's departure from the series' cinematic formula with its "picturesque" London setting and double mystery alongside the usual "action-packed ending", but felt it was hampered by poorly paced execution, "inconsistent production values", and no utilization of Sherlock Holmes himself, calling it "an awkwardly stretched-out episode instead of a feature film, and Holmes doesn't even show up to help."

=== Box office results ===
The final box office revenue of this work was 3.4 billion yen, exceeding 3 billion for the first time, and since it was the second largest Japanese film in 2002, Suwa is said to be a monument. This record wasn't broken until it was updated to 3.5 billion yen in the 13th film, The Raven Chaser.
