= Kim Woo-joo =

South Korean singer, pianist and lyricist

- Born: August 29, 1985 (age 40); Changwon, South Gyeongsang Province, South Korea
- Origin: South Korea
- Genres: Ballad
- Occupations: Singer, lyricist
- Years active: 2005–present

- Kim Woo-joo
- Hangul: 김우주
- RR: Gim Uju
- MR: Kim Uju

Kim Woo-joo (Korean: 김우주; born August 29, 1985) is a South Korean ballad singer, pianist and lyricist. Kim debuted in 2005 with the album "Before you sleep...".

On November 10, 2014, he released his third album "More Softly…" on music sites, marking his 10-year anniversary since his debut.

== Discography ==
=== Single ===
- "Beautiful Day" (2007)
- "Acoustic Love" (2013)
- "Farewell Rain" (2013)
- "Winter Night" (2014)
- "Like" (2014)
- "The First Day We Met" (2014)
- "Wedding Song" (2015)
- "Separate Ways" (2016)
- "Dawn in the Wind" (2016)
- "Crying Out Love" (2016)
- "Summer Stars" (2016)
- "Medicine" (2016)
- "Rub off (Ft. Slow J)" (2016)
- "Broke Up, 5min" (2016)
- "Who Did This" (2017)
- "ㅇㄱㄹㅇ(Love)" (2017)
- "Spring Rain" (2017)

=== Mini albums ===
- "내마음속에 내리는..." (2013)
- "Love You" (2014)
- "ROMANTIC" (2015)
- "Amante" (2016)

=== Full albums ===
- "Before you sleep..." (2005)
- "이별" (2006)
- "More Softly…" (2014)

=== Original soundtrack ===
- "Distance" (1 km OST Part 1, 2016)
- "It's You" (The Shining Eun Soo OST Part 16, 2017)

=== Collaborations ===
- "Happiness" with Seo Ji-young (2008)
- "Farewell Rain" with Han Groo (2013)
- "Winter Night" with Yiruma (2014)
- "Insomnia" with Space Cowboy (2016)
- "Rub Off" with Slow J (2016)

== Filmography ==
=== Music video ===
Year	Song title	With
2013	"Farewell Rain"	Han Groo
2014	"Winter Night"	Choo Soo-hyun
2014	"Like"	
2014	"The First Day We Met"	
2015	"ROMANTIC"	
2015	"Wedding Song"	
