= Smile Again (2006 TV series) =

2006 South Korean television series

- Promotional poster
- Genre: Romance, Drama
- Written by: Yoon Sung-hee
- Directed by: Hong Sung-chang
- Starring: Kim Hee-sun; Lee Dong-gun; Lee Jin-wook
- Country of origin: South Korea
- Original language: Korean
- No. of episodes: 16

Production
- Production locations: South Korea; Switzerland
- Running time: 60 minutes Wednesdays and Thursdays at 21:55 (KST)
- Production company: Victory Contents

Original release
- Network: Seoul Broadcasting System
- Release: May 17 – July 6, 2006

Smile Again (Korean: 스마일 어게인) is a 2006 South Korean television series starring Lee Dong-gun, Kim Hee-sun, Lee Jin-wook and Yoon Se-ah. It aired on SBS from May 17 to July 6, 2006 on Wednesdays and Thursdays at 21:55 for 16 episodes.

== Plot ==
Ban Ha-jin is calculating and ambitious. Even though he's an orphan and a high school drop out, he will use any means to fulfill his ambition. Through coincidence, he meets Yoon Jae-myung at a bar in Switzerland. Jae-myung is a popular former baseball player who went to the same high school as he did, and Ha-jin manipulates a series of events to become Jae-myung's best friend. He also runs into Oh Dan-hee, the girl he loved and hurt in high school.

Despite her painful childhood, Dan-hee grew up to be a tenacious, optimistic go-getter who dreams of becoming a world-class professional softball player. Although tormented from the memory of being humiliated by her ex-boyfriend Ha-jin, Dan-hee makes a pact with herself to move on. Her sports hero is Yoon Jae-myung.

After Switzerland, the three again become part of each other's lives back in Korea. Ha-jin starts working in Jae-myung's father's company and does everything to make the rich chairman like him, shrewdly climbing the corporate ladder until he becomes the boss's right-hand man. Dan-hee, who also works for the same company, is a softball player on the company's league team. Jae-myung becomes the team's coach, and he falls in love with Dan-hee whose headstrong and optimistic personality attracts him. Jae-myung tries every possible way to win her heart, as Ha-jin becomes torn between his ambition and his love for Dan-hee.

== Cast ==
=== Main cast ===
- Kim Hee-sun as Oh Dan-hee
- Lee Dong-gun as Ban Ha-jin
- Lee Jin-wook as Yoon Jae-myung
- Yoon Se-ah as Choi Yu-kang

=== Supporting cast ===
- Kim Bo-yeon as Sara Jung / Jung Ye-boon
- Im Chae-moo as Oh Joong-man
- Hong Ji-young as Oh Yeon-gyo
- Jo Hye-ryun as Kim Ok-joo
- Lee Eun-hee as Hong Young-ah
- Im Hyun-kyung as Park Chan-hee
- Lee Young-jin as Jung Hyun-soo
- Jo Dal-hwan as Ha-jin's friend
- Heo Yi-jae
- Park Yong-ki
- Choi Beom-ho

== Ratings ==
In this table, The blue numbers represent the lowest ratings and the red numbers represent the highest ratings.

Episode #	Original broadcast date	Average audience share (TNMS)	
Episode #	Original broadcast date	Nationwide	Seoul National Capital Area
1	May 17, 2006	13.4% (3rd)	14.3% (4th)
2	May 18, 2006	14.5% (5th)	14.8% (5th)
3	May 24, 2006	12.8% (3rd)	13.1% (4th)
4	May 25, 2006	14.2% (6th)	15.6% (6th)
5	June 1, 2006	11.5% (7th)	12.1% (6th)
6	June 2, 2006	13.0% (10th)	13.3% (11th)
7	June 7, 2006	10.8% (11th)	10.7% (12th)
8	June 8, 2006	12.2% (9th)	12.5% (9th)
9 & 10	June 15, 2006	11.6% (12th)	10.0% (17th)
11	June 21, 2006	10.4% (15th)	10.4% (14th)
12	June 22, 2006	10.0% (16th)	9.4% (15th)
13	June 28, 2006	10.3% (14th)	10.0% (13th)
14	June 29, 2006	11.6% (11th)	11.6% (12th)
15	July 5, 2006	-	10.0% (19th)
16	July 6, 2006	11.1% (15th)	10.6% (19th)
Average		11.160%	11.887%

== Reception ==
The drama's rating is imperatively decreased at the middle of the series was due to a football season. However, it still manage to stay above 10%.
