= Lee Ha-na =

South Korean actress (born 1982)

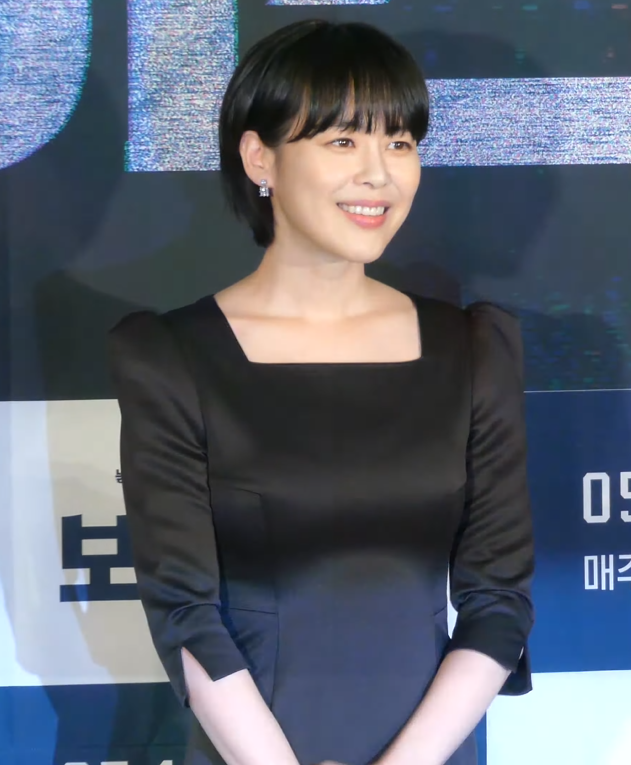
- Lee at Voice 3 press conference in May 2019
- Born: September 23, 1982 (age 44); Seoul, South Korea
- Education: Dankook University
- Occupation: Actress
- Years active: 2006–present

Korean name
- Hangul: 이하나
- RR: I Hana
- MR: I Hana

Lee Ha-na (Korean: 이하나; born September 23, 1982) is a South Korean actress. Lee made her acting debut with Alone in Love (2006). She is best known for her role as Kang Kwon-joo in the multiple seasons-procedural thriller Voice (2017–present).

== Early life ==
Lee Ha-na was born in Irwon bon-dong, Gangnam District, Seoul. Her father Lee Dae-heon is a composer, best known for folk-rock legend Kim Kwang-seok's signature song "Become Dust".

In 2008, she graduated from the College of Music at Dankook University (Cheonan campus) with a degree in Life Musicology.

== Career ==
Lee Ha-na first appeared in a commercial for telecom KTF's "umbrella service" in 2005. A year later, she made a memorable acting debut in the critically acclaimed television drama Alone in Love, as the extremely odd younger sister of the female protagonist.

She played another supporting role as a small-time swindler in When Spring Comes in 2007. Later that year, Lee was cast in her first leading role in Merry Mary (also known as Me-ri vs. Dae-gu's Attack and Defense Battle), a quirky romance between a mediocre singer and a failed novelist. This was followed by her big screen debut in Le Grand Chef, a film adaptation of Huh Young-man's manhwa Sikgaek, in which Lee played a TV producer who teams up with an aspiring chef.

Unlike her previous cheerful roles, Lee surprised critics and audiences in 2008 when she played a darker character in Women in the Sun (also known as Sisters in Love). In the melodrama, her character wreaks revenge when she learns that her older adopted sister abandoned her (when she was a five-year-old child) at a train station out of jealousy, causing her to grow up impoverished in an orphanage. Lee won an Excellence Award at the year-end KBS Drama Awards.

From November 21, 2008 to April 17, 2009, she was the host/MC of the live music program Lee Ha-na's Peppermint. Before she turned to acting, Lee had early aspirations of becoming a singer, so aside from introducing and interviewing guests, she frequently performed on the show, sometimes accompanying herself on the guitar or piano.

Lee then underwent training for her role as a figure skating coach in Triple, who finds herself in a love triangle with her ex-husband and his best friend who pursues her.

In 2010, Lee was cast opposite veteran actor Ahn Sung-ki in Shin Yeon-shick's film The Fair Love. She played a role of college student who after her father's death, embarks on an awkward yet endearing love affair with his friend, a bachelor in his fifties. This was followed in 2012 by the aviation action film R2B: Return to Base, a remake of Shin Sang-ok's 1964 film Red Scarf.

After a five-year absence from the small screen, Lee returned in High School King of Savvy, a 2014 cable romantic comedy about a high school student who masquerades as an executive at his brother's IT company; she played a temp who shows him the ropes.

In 2015, Lee was cast in the film Journalist, about the ruthless and at times unethical world of news reporting. In the same year, she also starred in KBS2's family-romance Unkind Ladies.

In 2017, Lee starred in OCN's drama Voice as a policewoman with an enhanced sense of hearing. The drama was a hit, and its ratings broke existing OCN viewership records when it aired in Korea. She then filmed comedy film Summer Vacation.

In 2018, Lee reprised her role in Voice 2, the sequel to OCN's drama Voice. Despite the shorter run, Voice 2 surpassed the first season's ratings and eventually became the highest-rated OCN drama. That same year, Lee was appointed as an honorary member of the police force by South Korea's National Police Agency.

In 2019, Lee once again reprised her lead female role in the third season of Voice.

In 2020, Lee starred in the melodrama A Piece of Your Mind.

Lee again returned for the fourth season of Voice in 2021, making her the lead on all four seasons of the Voice series.

Lee was cast in the 2022 KBS2's family weekend drama Three Bold Siblings, which marked her 4th collaboration with screenwriter Kim In-young, after 2007s Merry Mary, 2008s Women in the Sun and 2015s Unkind Ladies.

== Filmography ==
=== Television series ===
Year	Title	Role	Notes
2006	Alone in Love	Yoo Ji-ho	
2007	When Spring Comes	Moon Jae-ri	
2007	Merry Mary	Hwang Me-ri	
2008	Women in the Sun	Yoon Sa-wol	
2009	Triple	Choi Soo-in	
2014	High School King of Savvy	Jung Soo-young	
2015	Unkind Ladies	Jung Ma-ri	
2015	Oh My Ghost	radio DJ	Voice cameo (Ep. 1)
2015	KBS Drama Special	Kim Eun-soo	Episode: "Fake Family"
2017–2021	Voice	Kang Kwon-joo	Season 1–4
2018	Mistress	Mysterious woman	Cameo (Ep. 12)
2020	A Piece of Your Mind	Moon Soon-ho	
2022	Three Bold Siblings	Kim Tae-joo	

=== Film ===
Year	Title	Role
2007	Le Grand Chef	Jin-su
2009	Dance of Time	Narrator
2010	The Fair Love	Nam-eun
2012	R2B: Return to Base	Captain Oh Yoo-jin
2015	The Exclusive: Beat the Devil's Tattoo	Soo-jin
TBA	Summer Vacation	Jung-sun

=== Variety show ===
Year	Title	Notes
2008–2009	Lee Ha-na's Peppermint	Host

=== Music video appearances ===
Year	Title	Artist
2008	"Running"	Jung Jae-hyung
2009	Still You"	Yoon Dohyun
2014	"Garota"	Erlend Øye

== Discography ==
=== Singles ===
Year	Song title	Notes
2006	"당신의 연애시대, Love is 2" (Your Age of Love, Love is 2)	Track from Alone in Love OST
2007	"하얀 민들레" (White Dandelion)	Track from When Spring Comes OST
2007	"그대 혼자일 때" (When You Are Alone)	Track from Merry Mary OST
2007	"맛있는세상" (Delicious World)	Track from Le Grand Chef OST
2010	"Fallen"	Track from The Fair Love OST
2010	"우리 (We)" (single) (with Jang Dong-gun, Kim Seung-woo, Hwang Jung-min, Ji Jin-hee and Gong Hyung-jin)	

== Ambassadorship ==
- 2009 PR Ambassador of 46th Daejeong Film Awards
- 2011 PR Ambassador of Hurb-nanum Campaign (Korea Foundation for Persons with Disabilities)
- 2016–2020 PR Ambassador of Seoul
- 2018 Honorary Police Officer of the Korean National Police Agency

== Awards and nominations ==
Year	Award	Category	Nominated work	Result
2006	SBS Drama Awards	New Star Award	Alone in Love	Won
2007	43rd Baeksang Arts Awards	Best New Actress (TV)	Alone in Love	Nominated
2007	MBC Drama Awards	Best New Actress	Merry Mary	Won
2007	MBC Drama Awards	Best Couple Award with Ji Hyun-woo	Merry Mary	Nominated
2007	KBS Drama Awards	Best New Actress	When Spring Comes	Nominated
2008	44th Baeksang Arts Awards	Best New Actress (Film)	Le Grand Chef	Nominated
2008	45th Grand Bell Awards	Best New Actress	Le Grand Chef	Nominated
2008	16th Buil Film Awards	Best New Actress	Le Grand Chef	Nominated
2008	7th Korean Film Awards	Best New Actress	Le Grand Chef	Nominated
2008	29th Blue Dragon Film Awards	Best New Actress	Le Grand Chef	Nominated
2008	KBS Drama Awards	Excellence Award, Actress in a Miniseries	Women in the Sun	Won
2008	KBS Drama Awards	Best New Actress	Women in the Sun	Nominated
2008	KBS Drama Awards	Popularity Award, Actress	Women in the Sun	Nominated
2015	KBS Drama Awards	Excellence Award, Actress in One-Act/Special/Short Drama	KBS Drama Special: Fake Family	Won
2022	KBS Drama Awards	Excellence Award, Actress in a Serial Drama	Three Bold Siblings	Won
2022	KBS Drama Awards	Popularity Award, Actress	Three Bold Siblings	Nominated
2023	9th APAN Star Awards	Top Excellence Award, Actress in a Serial Drama	Three Bold Siblings	Nominated
