= Violent Cop =

- Film poster
- Directed by: Takeshi Kitano
- Written by: Hisashi Nozawa
- Produced by: Kazuyoshi Okuyama
- Starring: Takeshi Kitano
- Cinematography: Yasushi Sasakibara
- Edited by: Nobutake Kamiya
- Music by: Daisaku Kume
- Distributed by: Shochiku
- Release date: August 12, 1989
- Running time: 103 minutes
- Country: Japan
- Language: Japanese

Violent Cop (その男、凶暴につき, Sono Otoko, Kyōbō Ni Tsuki; lit. 'That Man, Being Violent') is a 1989 Japanese neo-noir action thriller film directed by Takeshi Kitano, written by Kitano and Hisashi Nozawa, and starring Kitano, Maiko Kawakami, Makoto Ashikawa, Hakuryu, Ken Yoshizawa, and Ittoku Kishibe. It follows Azuma, a Japanese police detective known for his rough and unprofessional conduct, after he is assigned to investigate drug trafficking by the yakuza. It was Kitano's directorial debut, and marked the beginning of his career as a filmmaker. Takeshi Kitano rewrote most of the film's original screenplay by Hisashi Nozawa.

== Plot ==
Azuma is a police detective who lives with his intellectually disabled sister Akari (of whom he is very protective) and has a gambling problem that forces him to constantly borrow money. He also has a strong sense of morality and a reputation for using excessive violence when dealing with criminals, ignoring police rules and regulations when they become inconvenient; for instance, after witnessing a gang of teenage boys beat up a homeless man for fun, he enters the home of the gang's leader and beats him before making him promise to turn himself and his friends in, which he does the next day. Azuma's superiors, who admire him for his ability to get results, overlook his constant violations of the police code by making him write "apologies" whenever he does something unlawful.

Azuma and his new partner Kikuchi are assigned to investigate the murder of a drug dealer, and break up an attempted drug deal in the bathroom of a nightclub. The seller, who works for yakuza boss Nito, names Azuma's close friend Iwaki, a vice squad detective, as his supplier. Azuma is subsequently asked to help find Iwaki, who has seemingly gone into hiding due to newspapers uncovering his ties to the yakuza, but a fisherman finds Iwaki's corpse hanging from a noose under a bridge. Refusing to believe that his friend committed suicide, Azuma attempts to track down the dealers from before, but both men are executed by sociopathic yakuza hitman Kiyohiro. Unable to take action against the well-connected Nito, Azuma plants drugs in Kiyohiro's apartment, apprehends him, and tortures him for information in the police station. However, this angers the police deputy chief, who forces Azuma to resign to protect the force from investigation.

Azuma spends his first day of unemployment doing what he pleases in town, but Kiyohiro and his men use the opportunity to kidnap Akari and bring her to their hideout, where they take turns raping her and getting her hooked on drugs. Kiyohiro also defies Nito's orders and tries to stab Azuma on a busy street; Azuma grabs the knife and Kiyohiro pulls a gun, accidentally killing a young woman when his shot misses, while Azuma manages to stab Kiyohiro in the leg and escapes. The next day, he purchases ammo and an unregistered firearm from a friend at the gambling parlor and practices shooting it, preparing to battle Kiyohiro.

Knowing Azuma is coming, Kiyohiro orders his men to arm themselves for a shootout but, finding they are unwilling to fight, executes two of them, while the third attempts to flee Kiyohiro's wrath but is gunned down by Azuma when he arrives. In the ensuing gunfight, Kiyohiro manages to shoot Azuma with multiple guns, but is shot and killed by him when he tries to find another. Azuma finally reunites with Akari, but finds she is now hopelessly addicted to drugs to the point of searching Kiyohiro's corpse for more, and he chooses to mercy kill her with his final bullet. A badly-wounded Azuma begins to leave, but is killed by Shinkai, Nito's former advisor, as revenge for Azuma killing Nito under the mistaken belief that he had ordered Kiyohiro to go after Akari.

Sometime later, Kikuchi, now a senior vice detective, meets with Shinkai, who explains that with the heat surrounding Azuma's actions dying down, he wants Kikuchi to take over for Iwaki and continue to sell drugs through the police force. Kikuchi eagerly accepts Shinkai's offer and leaves.

== Cast ==
- Takeshi Kitano as Azuma
- Maiko Kawakami as Akari
- Makoto Ashikawa as Kikuchi
- Shirō Sano as Yoshinari
- Sei Hiraizumi as Iwaki
- Mikiko Otonashi as Iwaki's wife
- Hakuryu as Kiyohiro
- Ittoku Kishibe as Nito
- Ken Yoshizawa as Shinkai
- Nobuyuki Katsube as Deputy Police Chief Higuchi
- Akira Hamada as Chief Detective Araki
- Yuuki Kawai as Detective Honma
- Ritsuko Amano as Honma's Fiancée
- Tarō Ishida as Detective Tashiro
- Kenichi Endō as Emoto
- Susumu Terajima as Oda

== Title ==
The Japanese title is the same as that given to the Japanese translation, by Makoto Sawa (佐和誠), of James Hadley Chase's 1968 novel Believed Violent, published by Tokyo Sogen-sha (東京創元社) in the Sogen Mystery Library (Sogen suiri bunko: 創元推理文庫) series in June 1972. The phrase「その男、凶暴につき」appears to suggest the wording of a police wanted poster ("This man, because of his extreme violence [should not be approached]"), but does not usually appear on Japanese wanted posters (shimei tehai: 指名手配), and may have been Sawa's own rendering of the English original.

After the movie, the title has been widely parodied in comics, magazine articles, books. For example, America's Most Dangerous Pets was translated as Kono Petto Kyōbō Ni Tsuki, with "pet" instead of "man".

== Production ==
=== Original screenplay ===
According to producer Kazuyoshi Okuyama, the film was originally meant to be a film adaptation of Ryūzō Saki’s novel Travelers of the Southern Cross (旅人たちの南十字星, Tabidachi no Minami Juujisei). With the script already completed, an adaptation of this insurance fraud scandal was set to take shape with Kinji Fukasaku as director, Fumio Kōnami as screenwriter, and Beat Takeshi and Takanori Jinnai as the leading roles. When, right before filming began, Kitano instigated a raid on Friday, a Japanese magazine, and The New York Times reported that Takeshi:

With 11 friends whom he described as part of his army, he marched into the offices of Friday, a scandal magazine, and roughed up a senior editor and four staff members. The comedian, one of the most popular entertainers in Japan, told the police that he could no longer restrain himself after a Friday photographer had intrusively taken pictures of his female companion.

The Friday raid incident caused the original plan of the film to be completely washed away. Due to the incident, there were talks of replacing Kitano with another actor that was just then doing really well in the Kansai region, but after various people looked at the script, this too was washed away.

After the producer and director discussed what to do about the whole thing, they came to the conclusion that since this movie was to be Beat Takeshi’s grand return, there was no way they could have a convicted criminal play the role of a criminal. And thus, the film became about a police detective.

=== Director ===
According to Fukasaku, he stepped down as director since he was against producer Okuyama’s action elements and was unable to agree on a schedule that worked for him. On the other hand, according to Okuyama, Fukasaku and Kitano butted heads a lot about how to move forward with filming. Kitano pushed for a single take model, stating, “I’ve staked my career on single attempts since I was a part of Asakusa Kids. The more and more we do retakes, all the freshness and passion in the acting will fade away.” (Note: "浅草から自分たちは一発勝負で笑わせてきた。繰り返せば繰り返すほど鮮度も熱量も薄れていく") And so, it is said that Fukasaku stepped down at Okuyama’s recommendation since he was unwilling to flinch on his style.

In the end, Okuyama asked Kitano to become the director, promising him complete freedom with schedule and directorial style. Kitano accepted with the single exception that he was allowed to edit the script as he pleased, staking his name and honor on the project. Production staff were generally unconvinced a comedian could direct a film, offering pointers as he went along, but due to the tight schedule, they ended up letting him do as he pleased.

=== Funding ===
While the film ended up being distributed by Shochiku, they were also going to produce and fund the film. However due to the Friday Raid, they decided not to go ahead with that plan, and Okuyama searched high and low for a replacement. For a time, Tohokushinsha was going to fund the film in full, however with Fukasaku stepping down as director, they too ceased funding. Their CEO however introduced them to the president of Bandai. However, since Bandai’s marketing copy at the time was “Bandai for mothers and children” (Note: "母と子のバンダイ"), they were hesitant to put their name on such a violent film. And so, it came to be that while they would fund it, they would not appear as a sponsor.

Okuyama ended up drafting the marketing copy “Keep this away from your kids” (Note: "コドモには、見せるな。") to sell the violent nature of the film, which came from Bandai’s then marketing copy.

=== Screenplay ===
The original screenwriter, Hisashi Nozawa, was so unable to come to terms with the screenplay being modified so heavily, that he submitted it into an original screenplay competition run in a magazine published by Takarajimasha as “Violent Cop Before it was Changed” (Note: "変えられる前の『その男、凶暴につき』"). Nozawa release a novel based on this screenplay entitled The Moon in a Fury.

=== Soundtrack ===
The piano theme heard several times during the movie is Erik Satie's "Gnossienne No.1". The nightclub scene briefly features the Hi-NRG/Europop song "The Girl You Need" by Tracey. "Long Road" by Roots Radics is the Reggae track playing on the yakuza cassette player.

== Reception ==
Violent Cop has an approval rating of 83% on review aggregator website Rotten Tomatoes, based on 6 reviews, and an average rating of 7.8/10.
