= Women in the Sun =

- Also known as: Women of the Sun; Sisters in Love
- Genre: Romance, Melodrama
- Written by: Kim In-young
- Directed by: Bae Kyung-soo
- Starring: Kim Ji-soo; Lee Ha-na; Han Jae-suk; Jung Gyu-woon
- Composer: Kim Seon-min
- Country of origin: South Korea
- Original language: Korean
- No. of episodes: 20

Production
- Executive producers: Jung Sung-hyo (KBS); Kim Hee-yeol (Pan Entertainment)
- Producers: Moon Joon-ha; Go Jae-hyun
- Production company: Pan Entertainment

Original release
- Network: KBS2
- Release: May 28 – July 31, 2008

Women in the Sun (Korean: 태양의 여자; RR: Taeyangui yeoja) is a 2008 South Korean television series starring Kim Ji-soo, Lee Ha-na, Han Jae-suk and Jung Gyu-woon. It aired on KBS2 from May 28 to July 31, 2008, for 20 episodes.

== Plot ==
Shin Do-young is a popular TV news anchor who seemingly has it all: good looks and brains, a cushy job and a privileged upbringing. But Do-young has a deep, dark secret. She was abandoned at an orphanage at a young age, but was adopted by a nice, well-off couple who were unable to have children of their own. But to the couple's surprise, they conceived a few years after Do-young's adoption, which led to the birth of their biological daughter, Ji-young. Afraid of losing the love of her adoptive parents, the teenage Do-young abandoned her five-year-old sister at a train station.

Twenty years later, Do-young hires a cheerful young woman named Yoon Sa-wol as her personal shopper. But Do-young's past returns to haunt her when Sa-wol is revealed to be Ji-young. When Sa-wol learns the truth, she plans her revenge by taking everything from her erstwhile sister, including the man Do-young loves.

== Cast ==
=== Main characters ===
- Kim Ji-soo as Shin Do-young / Kim Han-sook
  - Shim Eun-kyung as young Do-young (at 13 years old)
  - Kim Min-ha as young Do-young (in the theatre scene)
  - Lee Ra-hye as young Do-young (as a child)
- Lee Ha-na as Yoon Sa-wol / Shin Ji-young
  - Jung Min-ah as young Sa-wol
  - Lee Min-hee as young Ji-young
- Han Jae-suk as Kim Joon-se
- Jung Gyu-woon as Cha Dong-woo
  - Maeng Se-chang as young Dong-woo

=== Supporting characters ===
- Jung Ae-ri as Choi Jung-hee, Do-young's adoptive mother
- Kang In-deok as Shin Soo-ho, Do-young's adoptive father
- Kang Ji-sub as Hong Eun-sub
- Lee Yoo-jung as Jo Hyun-joo, Eun-sub's girlfriend
- Jang Young-nam as Kim Eun-bi, TV show writer
- Ahn Jung-hoon as Go Hoon, production director
- Yoo Jung-seok as Song Chan-young, assistant director
- Ji Il-joo as Sang-gu, gofer
- Kim Hye-eun as Jang Shi-eun, TV newscaster
- Ha Jae-sook as Park Yong-ja, Sa-wol's friend
- Kim Hyo-jin as Sister Isabelle Yoon, nun who runs the orphanage
- Yoon Joo-sang as President Jang Tae-mun
- Kim Mi-kyung as Park Young-sook, Do-young's biological mother
- Lee Chul-min as pickpocket
- Seo Ji-yeon as Secretary Jung
- Yoon Hyun-sook
- Jang Chae-woo
- Jung Min-ah
- Ahn Seo-jung
- Lee Seok-goo
- Jung Hyung-min
- Hyun Sook-hee

== Episode ratings ==
Date	Episode	Nationwide	Seoul Area
2008-05-28	1	6.8%	8.0%
2008-05-29	2	8.5% (18th)	8.2% (19th)
2008-06-04	3	8.1%	8.3%
2008-06-05	4	10.2% (10th)	10.1% (11th)
2008-06-11	5	9.3% (10th)	9.3% (11th)
2008-06-12	6	9.6% (13th)	9.8% (11th)
2008-06-18	7	10.3% (11th)	10.0% (10th)
2008-06-19	8	10.1% (10th)	10.4% (9th)
2008-06-25	9	12.0% (6th)	12.2% (7th)
2008-06-26	10	11.3% (9th)	11.4% (9th)
2008-07-02	11	12.4% (7th)	11.9% (7th)
2008-07-03	12	15.0% (7th)	15.2% (6th)
2008-07-09	13	15.1% (5th)	15.4% (5th)
2008-07-10	14	17.4% (3rd)	17.5% (3rd)
2008-07-16	15	16.8% (3rd)	16.4% (3rd)
2008-07-17	16	17.2% (4th)	17.3% (4th)
2008-07-23	17	20.1% (3rd)	20.6% (3rd)
2008-07-24	18	20.3% (3rd)	20.9% (3rd)
2008-07-30	19	25.5% (1st)	25.7% (1st)
2008-07-31	20	27.3% (1st)	27.6% (1st)
Average		14.2%	14.3%

Source: TNS Media Korea

== Awards and nominations ==
Year	Award	Category	Recipient	Result
2008	KBS Drama Awards	Top Excellence Award, Actress	Kim Ji-soo	Won
2008	KBS Drama Awards	Excellence Award, Actor in a Miniseries	Han Jae-suk	Nominated
2008	KBS Drama Awards	Excellence Award, Actress in a Miniseries	Lee Ha-na	Won
2008	KBS Drama Awards	Excellence Award, Actress in a Miniseries	Jung Ae-ri	Nominated
2008	KBS Drama Awards	Best Supporting Actor	Kang Ji-sub	Nominated
2008	KBS Drama Awards	Best New Actor	Jung Gyu-woon	Won
2008	KBS Drama Awards	Best New Actress	Lee Ha-na	Nominated
2008	KBS Drama Awards	Best Young Actress	Shim Eun-kyung	Won
2008	KBS Drama Awards	Popularity Award, Actress	Kim Ji-soo	Nominated
2008	KBS Drama Awards	Popularity Award, Actress	Lee Ha-na	Nominated
2009	45th Baeksang Arts Awards	Best Actress (TV)	Kim Ji-soo	Nominated
2009	45th Baeksang Arts Awards	Best New Actor (TV)	Jung Gyu-woon	Nominated
