= The Time We Were Not in Love =

2015 South Korean television series

- Promotional poster
- Also known as: The Time That I Loved You, 7000 Days; The Time That I Loved You; The Time I Loved You; My Time With You
- Genre: Romance; Comedy; Drama
- Based on: In Time with You by Mag Hsu
- Written by: Jung Do-yoon; Lee Ha-na
- Directed by: Jo Soo-won
- Starring: Ha Ji-won; Lee Jin-wook; Yoon Kyun-sang; Choo Soo-hyun
- Country of origin: South Korea
- Original language: Korean
- No. of episodes: 16

Production
- Executive producers: Hong Sung-chang; Kim Jong-shik; Song Jae-joon
- Producer: Kim Dong-ho
- Running time: 60 minutes
- Production company: iWill Media

Original release
- Network: SBS TV
- Release: June 27 – August 16, 2015

Related
- In Time with You

The Time We Were Not in Love (Korean: 너를 사랑한 시간; RR: Neoreul saranghan sigan; lit. 'The Time I've Loved You') is a 2015 South Korean television series starring Ha Ji-won and Lee Jin-wook, adapted from the award-winning 2011 Taiwanese drama In Time with You. It aired on SBS from June 27 to August 16, 2015 on Saturdays and Sundays at 22:00 for 16 episodes.

== Plot ==
Oh Ha-na and Choi Won are both 34 years old and have been best friends since high school. For the past seventeen years they have been present for every milestone in each other's lives; but, through missed timing, a romance has never developed between them.

== Cast ==
=== Main ===
- Ha Ji-won as Oh Ha-na
- Lee Jin-wook as Choi Won
- Yoon Kyun-sang as Cha Seo-hoo
- Choo Soo-hyun as Lee So-eun

=== Supporting ===
==== People around Oh Ha-na ====
- Shin Jung-geun as Oh Jung-geun, Ha-na's father
- Seo Ju-hee as Kim Soo-mi, Ha-na's mother
- Lee Joo-seung as Oh Dae-bok, Ha-na's younger brother

==== People around Choi Won ====
- Jin Kyung as Choi Mi-hyang
- Kang Rae-yeon as Kang Na-young, Ha-na and Won's friend
- Choi Dae-chul
- Jang Hee-soo as Choi Won's mother
- Lee Dong-jin as Song Min-gook
- Jang Sung-won as Bong Woo-jin
- Seo Dong-gun as Jang Dong-gun

==== People at Tandy ====
- Choi Jung-won as Joo Ho-joon, Ha-na's two-timing ex-boyfriend
- Woo Hyun as Byun Woo-sik
- Hong In-young as Hwang Bit-na
- Go Won-hee as Yoon Min-ji
- Park Doo-shik as Eun Dae-yoon
- Bae Woo-hee as Hong Eun-jung, Ha-na's hoobae and later Dae-bok's girlfriend

=== Guest and cameo appearances ===
- Jo Young-gu as Manager at shoe company (episode 1)
- Hong Seok-cheon as Airplane passenger (episode 1)
- Park Joon-myun
- Kim Myung-soo as Ki Sung-jae (episodes 2–4)
- Choo Sung-hoon (episode 2)
- Yoon Sang-hyun (episode 2)
- On Joo-wan (episode 2)
- Shin Eun-kyung as Gu Yeon-jung (episode 3)
- Jang Su-won
- Park Jong-hoon as Professor

== Production ==
Television director Jo Soo-won (I Can Hear Your Voice, Pinocchio) and screenwriter Min Hyo-jung (Cats on the Roof, Full House) were originally hired for the series. Then on May 15, 2015 Jo dropped out of the project due to "creative differences" with production company iWill Media; he returned a week later on 22 May, and a statement was released that Min had been replaced with screenwriters Jung Do-yoon (Grudge: The Revolt of Gumiho, Baby Faced Beauty) and Lee Ha-na (Cunning Single Lady).

The series' first teaser trailer was released online on June 6, 2015, then taken down a few days later after its concept was confirmed to have been plagiarized from the 2014 animated short film Jinxy Jenkins, Lucky Lou.

== Ratings ==
In the table below, the blue numbers represent the lowest ratings and the red numbers represent the highest ratings.

Ep.	Broadcast date	Average audience share			
Ep.	Broadcast date	TNmS		AGB Nielsen	
Ep.	Broadcast date	Nationwide	Seoul	Nationwide	Seoul
1	June 27, 2015	6.5%	8.6%	6.7%	7.6%
2	June 28, 2015	6.1%	7.3%	6.6%	7.2%
3	July 4, 2015	6.2%	7.4%	6.7%	7.3%
4	July 5, 2015	5.8%	7.0%	7.1%	7.9%
5	July 11, 2015	7.3%	9.4%	7.1%	7.5%
6	July 12, 2015	5.8%	7.6%	7.0%	7.6%
7	July 18, 2015	6.8%	8.9%	5.4%	6.2%
8	July 19, 2015	6.1%	7.9%	6.2%	7.4%
9	July 25, 2015	6.2%	7.8%	6.6%	6.9%
10	July 26, 2015	5.3%	7.2%	5.5%	6.4%
11	August 1, 2015	5.9%	7.1%	5.9%	6.4%
12	August 2, 2015	5.0%	7.2%	4.7%	6.6%
13	August 8, 2015	5.6%	6.5%	5.7%	6.4%
14	August 9, 2015	5.6%	7.3%	6.1%	6.6%
15	August 15, 2015	5.0%	6.7%	6.2%	6.9%
16	August 16, 2015	5.6%	7.1%	6.4%	6.7%
Average		5.9%	7.5%	6.2%	6.9%

== Original soundtrack ==
The Time We Were Not in Love Official Soundtrack

Soundtrack album by various artists
- Released: August 8, 2015
- Genre: Soundtrack
- Labels: SBS Contents Hub; LOEN Entertainment, Inc.

No.	Title	Artist	Length
1.	"우리가 사랑한 시간" (The Time I've Loved You)	Cho Kyuhyun (Super Junior)	3:56
2.	"내 사랑의 노래" (My Love Song)	Rooftop Moonlight	3:21
3.	"너를 사랑한 시간"	Jung Seung-hwan	4:28
4.	"마음이 가네" (Heart-stirring)	Every Single Day	3:16
5.	"왜 이럴까" (Why Am I Like This)	Bae Suzy (Miss A)	3:38

== Awards and nominations ==
Year	Award	Category	Recipient	Result
2015	SBS Drama Awards	New Star Award	Yoon Kyun-sang	Won
2015	SBS Drama Awards	Best Couple Award	Lee Jin-wook & Ha Ji-won	Nominated
2015	SBS Drama Awards	Netizen Popularity Award	Ha Ji-won	Nominated
2015	SBS Drama Awards	Netizen Popularity Award	Lee Jin-wook	Nominated
2015	SBS Drama Awards	Top Excellence Award, Actor in a Miniseries	Lee Jin-wook	Nominated
2015	SBS Drama Awards	Top Excellence Award, Actress in a Miniseries	Ha Ji-won	Nominated
