= The Fair Love =

- Theatrical poster
- Hangul: 페어 러브
- RR: Peeo reobeu
- MR: P'eŏ rŏbŭ
- Directed by: Shin Yeon-shick
- Written by: Shin Yeon-shick
- Produced by: Shin Yeon-shick
- Starring: Ahn Sung-ki; Lee Ha-na
- Cinematography: Choi Geon-hui
- Edited by: Choi Young-jin
- Music by: Kim Shin-il
- Distributed by: CJ Entertainment
- Release date: January 14, 2010
- Running time: 117 minutes
- Country: South Korea
- Language: Korean
- Budget: US$93,000

The Fair Love (Korean: 페어 러브; lit. 'Fair Love') is a 2010 South Korean romance film starring Ahn Sung-ki and Lee Ha-na. It premiered at the 2009 Busan International Film Festival, and was released in theaters on January 14, 2010.

== Plot ==
Hyung-man (Ahn Sung-ki) is a man in his 50s who leads a lonely, ordered life. He runs a small camera repair shop, and his mastery of this intricate skill draws customers from across the city. He also has a talent for photography, though for him it's more of a hobby than a vocation. He's still single, in fact he has never even dated a woman before. If the world were more fair he would be materially secure, but years earlier one of his best friends, Ki-hyuk, took his life savings and ran off. Since then, his life has never been the same.

Therefore, he is stunned and flummoxed when his former friend Ki-hyuk summons him to his deathbed for an unconvincing apology and, on top of that, a request. Ki-hyuk's daughter Nam-eun (Lee Ha-na), now in her 20s, will be alone after he is gone, so Ki-hyuk asks Hyung-man to please stop in every once in a while and check on her after he dies. Hyung-man feels rightly that he owes his friend nothing. But the daughter has done him no wrong, so after Ki-hyuk passes away, Hyung-man eventually knocks on her door.

Upon meeting her, he notices that Nam-eun seems to be more distressed over the death of her pet cat than her father's. Meanwhile, Nam-eun finds Hyung-man intriguing, so using his dirty laundry as an excuse, she begins to visit him frequently and gradually falls for him. When she expresses her feelings for him, Hyung-man is at first shocked. But as his awkwardness fades, he realizes that he reciprocates, and he starts to feel and even act like a teenager in love. Despite a twenty-six-year age difference, Hyung-man and Nam-eun decide to embark on a relationship.

== Cast ==
- Ahn Sung-ki ... Hyung-man
- Lee Ha-na ... Nam-eun
- Yun Seung-jun ... Jin-tae
- Lee Hyeon-ho ... Jae-hyeong
- Kim Jeong-seok ... Jeong-seok
- Kim In-soo ... Reverend Kang
- Kwon Hyeok-poong ... President Yoon
- Choi Jong-ryeol ... Hyung-man's brother
- Kim Min-kyeong ... Sister-in-law
- Heo Yeon-jeong ... Jae-eun
- Jeong Seong-il ... Jae-woong
- Yoo In-na ... Jin-hee
- Kil Chang-gyu ... Ki-hyuk
- Lee Choon-yeon ... Store owner
