= Hisashi Nozawa =

Japanese screenwriter and mystery novelist (1960-2004)

Nozawa, Hisashi
- Born: May 17, 1960; Japan
- Died: June 28, 2004 (aged 44); Tokyo, Japan
- Occupations: Author, screenwriter
- Writing career
- Language: Japanese
- Genres: Fiction, screenplays
- Notable work: Violent Cop

Hisashi Nozawa (野沢 尚, Nozawa Hisashi; 7 May 1960 – 28 June 2004) was a Japanese screenwriter and mystery novelist. He won the Kuniko Mukōda Prize in 1998 for his screenplays Nemureru Mori (A Sleeping Forest) and Kekkon Zen'ya (The Night before the Wedding). He also won the Edogawa Rampo Prize in 1997 for Hasen no marisu (Dotted-line Malice) and the Eiji Yoshikawa Prize for New Writers in 2001 for Shinku (Crimson). The South Korean TV Network SBS broadcast a 16-episode drama Alone in Love adapted from one of his novels in 2006. He also wrote the animated film Detective Conan - The Phantom of Baker Street.

He was found dead in his office in Tokyo's Meguro ward, after he had apparently hanged himself several days earlier. A note was also found at the scene.

== Works ==
=== Screenplays ===
- Shin'ai naru mono e (1992)
- Subarashiki kana Jinsei (1993)
- Kono Ai ni Ikite (1994)
- Koibito yo (1995)
- Oishii Kankei (1996)
- Aoi Torri (1997)
- Kekkon Zen'ya (1998)
- Nemureru Mori (1998)
- Kōri no Sekai (1999)
- Rimitto Moshi mo, Waga Ko ga... (2000)
- Mofuku no randevū (2000)
- Suiyōbi no Jijō (2001)
- Nemurenu Yoru o Daite (2002)
- Kawa, Itsuka umi e (2003)
- Saka no Ue no Kumo (2009-2011)

=== Film ===
- V. Madonna Daisensō (1985)
- Maririn ni Aitai (1988)
- Stay Gold (1988)
- Violent Cop (1989)
- Saraba Itoshi no Yakuza (1990)
- Satsujin ga Ippai (1991)
- Aka to Kuro no Netsujō (1992)
- Kachō Shima Kōsaku (1992)
- Last Song (1994)
- Shūdan Sasen (1994)
- Watashi-tachi ga Suki datta koto (1997)
- Fuyajō (1998)
- Hasen no Marisu (2000)
- Shinku (2005)

=== Anime ===
- Case Closed: The Phantom of Baker Street (2002)

== See also ==
- Alone in Love
