= Kim Mi-kyung =

South Korean actress (born 1963)

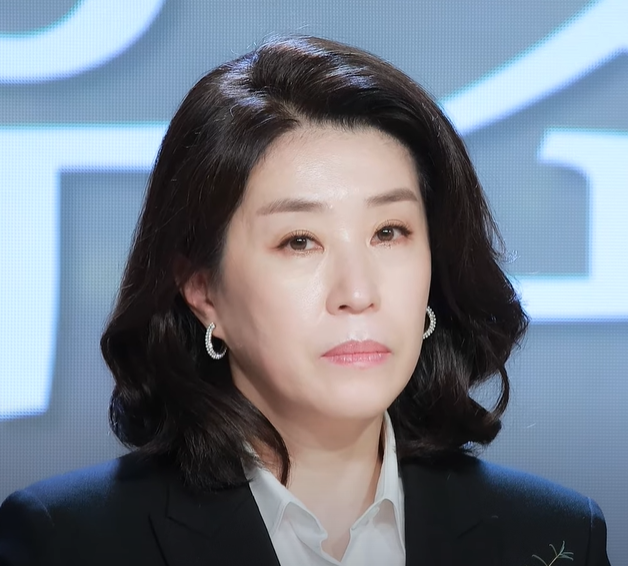
- Kim in November 2020
- Born: October 14, 1963 (age 63); Busan, South Korea
- Occupation: Actress
- Years active: 1985–present
- Agent(s): CL&COMPANY
- Spouse: Park Geun-won (m. 1994)
- Children: 1

Korean name
- Hangul: 김미경
- Hanja: 金美卿
- RR: Gim Migyeong
- MR: Kim Migyŏng
- Website: clncompany.co.kr

Kim Mi-kyung (Korean: 김미경; born October 14, 1963) is a South Korean actress. She is most active as a supporting actress in television dramas. Kim has been a member of the Yeonwoo Mudae theater company since 1985.

== Personal life ==
On December 8, 2023, it was revealed that Kim had been diagnosed with stroke syndrome and has undergone surgery for osteoarthritis.

On July 3, 2024, Kim's mother died.

== Filmography ==
=== Film ===
Key
†	Denotes films that have not yet been released

Year	Title	Role	Notes
1986	Lee Jang-ho's Baseball Team		
1993	Dead End		
2001	One Fine Spring Day	Band teacher	
2003	Acacia	Tree mother 2	
2004	Dance with the Wind	Ajumma selling tteokbokki	
2004	S Diary	Yoo-in's mother	
2007	Secret Sunshine	Boutique owner	
2007	Shadows in the Palace	Court lady Shim	
2008	If You Were Me: Anima Vision 2	Wife/Grandmother (voice)	segment: "Baby"
2011	G-Love	Nun principal	
2011	Blind	School director	
2011	Always	Sister Joanna	
2011	그녀의 13월		
2015	C'est Si Bon	Oh Geun-tae's mother	
2015	The Chosen: Forbidden Cave	Choon-ae	
2019	Warning: Do Not Play	Professor in Film department	cameo
2019	Kim Ji-young: Born 1982	Mi-sook	

=== Television series ===
Key
†	Denotes television productions that have not yet been released

Year	Title	Role
1993	Love is Helpless	
1997	There is a Bluebird	Mrs. Baek
1998	Song of the Wind	Mrs. Song
1999	KAIST	Kiosk owner
2002	Great Ambition	Park Yeo-jin
2003	Sang Doo! Let's Go to School	Cha Sang-doo's teacher
2003	Rosemary	Jo Mi-sook
2004	Sunlight Pours Down	Han Jung-do
2005	Sassy Girl Chun-hyang	Therapist (guest, episode 9)
2005	Encounter	
2005	Drama City: "Goblins Are Alive"	Teacher Kang
2005	Young-jae's Golden Days	Sung Mi-kyung
2006	Goodbye Solo	Ahn Hae-young
2006	Spring Waltz	Kim Bong-hee
2006	Hearts of Nineteen	Kim Ok-geum
2006	Someday	Choi Jae-deok's mother
2007	By My Side	Lee Yoon-sub's mother
2007	Daughters-in-Law	Oh Sang-sook
2007	The Legend	Bason
2007	In-soon Is Pretty	Oh Myung-sook
2008	Kokkiri (Elephant)	Mom
2008	Who Are You?	Oh Young-hee
2008	Bitter Sweet Life	Mrs. Ri
2008	Women in the Sun	Park Young-sook
2008	Don't Cry My Love	Han Young-ok
2008	Mrs. Saigon	
2009	The Slingshot	Detective Kim
2009	Partner	Jung Jae-ho's mother (guest, episodes 1-3)
2009	Tamra, the Island	Choi Jang-nyeo
2009	I'll Give You Everything	Choi Yong-shim
2010	Becoming a Billionaire	Park Kang-woo's mother
2010	Running, Gu	Eun-mi
2010	Sungkyunkwan Scandal	Ms. Jo
2010	KBS Drama Special: "A Family's Secret"	Go Yang-hee
2010	Secret Garden	Ajumma at boiled fish restaurant
2011	Drama Special Series: "Hair Show"	Park Jung-rae
2011	Baby Faced Beauty	Director Baek
2011	My Love By My Side	Choi Eun-hee
2011	Lights and Shadows	Kim Geum-rye
2011	What's Up?	Professor Yang Soo-jung
2012	Drama Special Series: "Just an Ordinary Love Story"	Mrs. Shin
2012	Golden Time	Lee Min-woo's mother
2012	Faith	Court lady Choi
2012	Missing You	Song Mi-jung
2013	7th Grade Civil Servant	Oh Mak-nae
2013	The Queen of Office	Kim Sook-ja
2013	The Fugitive of Joseon	Seo Jang-geum
2013	Goddess of Marriage	Kim Hyun-woo's mother
2013	I Can Hear Your Voice	Jeon Young-ja/Seon Chae-ok (guest, episodes 12–14, 16)
2013	Master's Sun	Joo Sung-ran
2013	The Heirs	Park Hui-nam
2014	Big Man	Ahn Bong-rim
2014	Make Your Wish	Lee Jung-sook
2014	It's Okay, That's Love	Ji Hae-soo's mother
2014	Plus Nine Boys	Gu Bok-ja
2014	Blade Man	Housekeeper
2014	Healer	Jo Min-ja
2015	Super Daddy Yeol	Hwang Ji-woo
2015	Brilliant Seduction	Choi Gang-ja
2015	Yong-pal	Charge nurse in general surgery
2016	Another Miss Oh	Hwang Deok-yi
2016	Person Who Gives Happiness	Park Bok-ae
2016	The Sound of Your Heart	Jo Seok's mother
2017	Introverted Boss	Ro-woon's mother
2017	Saimdang, Memoir of Colors	
2017	Children of the 20th Century	Kim Mi-kyung
2017	Go Back	Go Eun-sook
2018	Grand Prince	Ahn Jook-san
2018	Marry Me Now	Jung Jin-hee
2018	My Strange Hero	Lee Jung-sun
2019	Her Private Life	Go Young-sook
2019	Love Affairs in the Afternoon	Na Ae-ja
2019	VIP	Kye Mi-ok
2020	Hi Bye, Mama!	Jeon Eun-sook
2020	It's Okay to Not Be Okay	Kang Soon-deok
2020	Was It Love?	Choi Hyang-ja
2020	18 Again	Yeo In-ja
2020	When I Was the Most Beautiful	Kim Go-woon
2021	She Would Never Know	Lee Jae-shin's mother (cameo)
2021	Sell Your Haunted House	Yeom Sa-jang (special appearance)
2022	Forecasting Love and Weather	Bae Soo-ja
2022	Welcome to Wedding Hell	Lee Dal-young
2022	Remarriage & Desires	Lee Hyeong-joo's mother
2022	Trolley	Woo Jin-seok
2023	Agency	Seo Eun-ja
2023	Crash Course in Romance	Jung Young-soon
2023	Doctor Cha	Oh Deok-rye
2023–2024	Welcome to Samdal-ri	Go Mi-ja
2023–2024	Tell Me That You Love Me	Na Ae-sook
2023–2024	Death's Game	Choi Yi-jae's mother
2024	Knight Flower	Yoo Geum-ok
2024	Black Out	Jung Geum-hee
2025	Genie, Make a Wish	Oh Pan-geum
2025	As You Stood By	Park Gye-soon
2025	Surely Tomorrow	Jo Nam-sook
2026	Phantom Lawyer	Park Gyeong Hwa
2026–2027	Nine to Six †	Lee Kyung-shim

=== Web series ===
Year	Title	Role	Ref.
2017	Irish Uppercut	Angel of Death Kim	

== Theater ==
Year	Title	Role
	A Crying Bird on the Border	
1985	Mr. Han's Chronicle	
1988	Even Birds Quit This World	
1990	Teacher Choi	
1991	Dongseung	

== Awards and nominations ==
Year	Award	Category	Nominated work	Result	Ref.
1990	26th Baeksang Arts Awards	Best New Actress (Theater)		Won	
2013	SBS Drama Awards	Special Award, Actress in a Miniseries	Master's Sun	Won	
2016	KBS Entertainment Awards	Hot Issue Variety Award	The Sound of Your Heart	Won	
2017	MBC Drama Awards	Top Excellence Award, Actress in a Soap Opera	Person Who Gives Happiness	Won	
2020	25th Chunsa Film Art Awards	Best Supporting Actress	Kim Ji-young: Born 1982	Won	
2020	56th Baeksang Arts Awards	Best Supporting Actress	Kim Ji-young: Born 1982	Nominated	
2020	40th Korean Association of Film Critics Awards	Best Supporting Actress	Kim Ji-young: Born 1982	Won	
2021	41st Blue Dragon Film Awards	Best Supporting Actress	Kim Ji-young: Born 1982	Nominated	
2021	40th Golden Cinema Film Festival	Best Supporting Actress	Kim Ji-young: Born 1982	Won	
