= Voice (TV series) =

2017–2021 South Korean crime-thriller television series

- Main poster for season 4
- Hangul: 보이스
- RR: Boiseu
- MR: Poisŭ
- Genre: Thriller; Procedural
- Created by: OCN: Studio Dragon; Choi Jin-hee
- Written by: Ma Jin-won
- Directed by: Kim Hong-sun (S1); Kim Sang-hoon (S1); Lee Seung-yeong (S2); Nam Ki-hoon (S3); Shin Yong-whee (S4)
- Creative directors: Kang In-goo; Kim Mi-ra
- Starring: Lee Ha-na; Jang Hyuk; Lee Jin-wook; Song Seung-heon
- Composers: Gaemi (S1-3); Lim Ha-young (S4)
- Country of origin: South Korea
- Original language: Korean
- No. of seasons: 4
- No. of episodes: 58

Production
- Executive producers: Lee Chan-ho; Choi Kwang-yong; Ma Jung-hoon
- Producer: Kim Ryun-hee
- Cinematography: Kang Seung-ki; Choo Kwang-jae
- Editor: Oh Sang-hwan
- Camera setup: Single-camera
- Running time: 60 minutes
- Production companies: Content K (S1 to S3); Story & Pictures Media (S4)

Original release
- Network: OCN
- Release: January 14, 2017 – June 30, 2019
- Network: tvN
- Release: June 18 – July 31, 2021

Voice (Korean: 보이스) is a South Korean crime-thriller television series starring Lee Ha-na, Jang Hyuk (Season 1), Lee Jin-wook (Season 2 & 3), and Song Seung-heon (Season 4) which follows the lives of 112 emergency call center and dispatch team members as they fight against crimes using the sounds that they hear. It premiered on OCN on January 14, 2017. The first season concluded on March 12. The second season aired from August 11 to September 16, 2018. The third season aired from May 11 to June 30, 2019. The fourth season was premiered on June 18, 2021, and it aired on every Friday and Saturday at 22:50 KST on tvN till July 31, 2021.

== Series overview ==
Season	Episodes	Originally released			Airtime
Season	Episodes	First released	Last released	Network	Airtime
1	16	January 14, 2017	February 12, 2017	OCN	Saturday and Sunday at 22:00 (KST)
2	12	August 11, 2018	September 16, 2018	OCN	Saturday and Sunday at 22:20 (KST)
3	16	May 11, 2019	June 30, 2019	OCN	Saturday and Sunday at 22:20 (KST)
4	14	June 18, 2021	July 31, 2021	tvN	Friday and Saturday at 22:50 (KST)

== Synopsis ==
=== Season 1 ===
Moo Jin-hyuk (Jang Hyuk) is a "mad dog" detective who becomes guilt-ridden after his wife was murdered while he was at work. Kang Kwon-joo (Lee Ha-na) is a tough policewoman who is gifted with perfect psycho-acoustics skills and went for voice profiling. She was working at the call center when a brutal murder case took place and in the process of investigating, her father, a veteran patrol police, was killed. Three years later, Jin-hyuk and Kwon-joo team up as the "Golden Time team" and solve cases together, chasing after the psychopathic serial killer who took their loved ones. It is revealed that Kwon-joo father was killed because he witnessed the murder of Jin-hyuk's wife and died after trying to stop the killer.

=== Season 2 ===
The Golden Time team solves urgent real-time incidents from phone calls received through the emergency service line. They race through the precarious time left for crime victims, who are held captive or being chased by their assailants and save them from the imminent danger. One day, a mysterious serial killer named Dr Fabre appears, A voice profiler police and center director of 112 call center, Kang Kwon-joo teams up with Dispatch Team Leader and stubborn Detective Do Kang-woo (Lee Jin-wook) to solve that crime. They try to arrest Dr Fabre while solving other diverse cases, including voice phising, date harassment, and illegal car racing.

=== Season 3 ===
The Golden Time team solves urgent real-time incidents from phone calls received through the emergency service line. They race through the precarious time left for crime victims, who are held captive or being chased by their assailants, and save them from the imminent danger. One day, the team members face an international evil cartel that is behind a string of cyber crimes. In order to fight against the cartel and save lives within the golden time, a talented voice profiler police Kang Kwon-joo executes instructions to the detective field units, Do Kang-woo and his team.

=== Season 4 ===
A serial killer with an enhanced hearing ability appears. The serial killer murders people using his enhanced ability. Because of this, Kang Kwon-joo, who also has an enhanced hearing ability, is driven into a corner. Kang Kwon-joo cooperates with Detective Derek Jo (Song Seung-heon) to catch the serial killer. Derek Jo is a person of principle, who doesn't allow mistakes. He is a team leader from the LAPD (Los Angeles Police Department). His LAPD team dealt with criminal gangs.

== Cast ==
=== Main ===
- Lee Ha-na as Kang Kwon-joo
  - Choi Myung-bin as young Kang Kwon-joo
- Jang Hyuk as Moo Jin-hyuk (season 1)
- Lee Jin-wook as Do Kang-woo (seasons 2–3)
  - Bae Kang-yoo as young Do Kang-woo/Kosuke Matsuda (season 3)
- Song Seung-heon as Derek Jo (season 4)
  - Jung Hyeon-jun as young Derek Jo

=== Supporting ===
==== Season 1 ====
112 Report Center's Golden Time Team

- Baek Sung-hyun as Shim Dae-shik, junior detective and Jin-hyuk's close friend
- Yesung as Oh Hyun-ho, IT specialist
- Son Eun-seo as Park Eun-soo, language specialist
- Kwon Hyung-joong as Chun Sang-pil

The Police

- Lee Hae-young as Jang Kyung-hak, violent crime unit chief
- Jo Young-jin as Bae Byung-gon, police commissioner
- Kim Joong-ki as Park Joong-ki, violent crime unit detective
- Song Boo-gun as Goo Gwang-soo, violent crime unit detective
- Baek Cheon-ki as Kim Pyeong-jo, violent crime unit detective

Cases characters

Eunhyung-dong Policeman's Wife Murder Case (Ep. 1)

- Oh Yeon-ah as Heo Ji-hye, Jin-hyuk's wife
- Son Jong-hak as Kang Kook-hwan, Kwon-joo's father (special appearance)
- Hwang Sang-kyung as Go Dong-chul, murder suspect
- Kim Jae-wook as Mo Tae-goo, CEO of Sungwun Express
  - Song Sung-han as young Mo Tae-goo

Eunhyung-dong Kidnapping Case (Ep. 1–2)

- Kim Tae-han as Jo Gwang-cheon, kidnapper
- Jeon Soo-jin as Park Bok-nim, kidnapped school girl

Burim-dong Child Abuse and Murder Case (Ep. 2–3)

- Bae Jung-hwa as Oh Soo-jin, abusive mother
- Choi Seung-hoon as Son Ah-ram, abused child
- Kwon Byung-gil as Baek Sung-hak, security guard

Hongchang-dong Kidnapping Case (Ep. 4–6)

- Lee Joo-seung as Hwang Kyung-il, bespectacled teacher
  - Jung Joon-won as young Hwang Kyung-il
- Han Bo-bae as Park Eun-byul, Eun-soo's younger sister
- Kim Ji-hoon as Woo Bong-gil, accomplice

Surim-dong Chunsoo Townhouse Murder Case (Ep. 6–8)

- Lee Yong-nyeo as Park Bok-soon / Shim Chun-ok, elderly landlord
- Yoon Kyung-ho as Yoon Pil-bae, tenant
- Park Eun-young as Bang Mal-nyun, woman who called police
- Shin Seung-hwan as Shim Young-woon, Chun-ok's brother

Gwangchang-dong Club Fever Hostage Case (Ep. 9-10)

- Kim Ho-young as Yang Ho-shik, electrician and genius hacker

Bangha-dong Nakwon Welfare Center Case (Ep. 11–12)

- Hong Sung-duk as Baek Jin-goo, mental patient
- Yeo Moo-young as Byun Sang-an / Kang Hyun-pal, welfare center director
- Jo Wan-gi as Kim Gyu-hwan, welfare center therapist
- Lee Na-yoon as Sae-bom, little girl

Woogyeong-ri Bus accident Case (Ep. 14–15)

- Park Noh-sik as Park Jong-woo, Sungwun Express bus driver
- Oh Cho-hee as Na Jung-eun, pregnant bus passenger
- Min Jung-sub as Jung Chul-ho, Na Jung-eun's husband
- Kim Hyun as Im Mi-ho
- Kim Jun-hyuk as Im Mi-ho's son

Others

- Lee Si-woo as Moo Dong-woo, Jin-hyuk's son
- Lee Joo-sil as Eun-soo's grandmother
- Kim Myeong-kuk as Cha Myung-chul
- Choi Ki-sub as Tabloid, Jin-hyuk's informant
- Kim Roi-ha as Nam Sang-tae, CEO of GP development
- Yoon Ji-min as Jang Gyu-ah, Fantasia's lady boss
- Lee Do-kyung as Mo Gi-beom, Chairman of Sungwun Express, Mo Tae-gu's father
- Jang Won-young as Kwon Chang-tae, Director of land planning department
- Kang Moon-kyung as Kim Joon-tae, Minister of land planning
- Kim Yong-woon as Ji Choon-bae, Nam Sang-tae's right-hand man
- Hong Seung-jin as killer from Southeast Asia
- Song Young-kyu as Park Eun-cheol, prosecutor working for Sungwun Group
- Lee Jae-won as Mo Tae-gu's assistant and driver
- Kim Ik-tae as retired forensic doctor
- Lee Ji-hye as 112 report center's Golden Time team member
- Kook Ki-hoon as 112 report center's Golden Time team member

==== Season 2 ====
- Kwon Yul as Bang Je-soo
- Son Eun-seo as Park Eun-soo, Golden Time team member
- Oh Yoon-hong as Joo Hye-jung
- Ahn Se-ha as Kwak Dok-ki, Do Kang-woo's friend
- Kim Woo-suk as Jin Seo-yool, Golden Time team member
- Yoo Seung-mok as Na Hong-soo, Violent crime unit team leader
- Kim Ki-nam as Yang Choon-byung, Violent crime unit team member
- Kim Joong-ki as Park Joong-ki, Golden Time dispatch team member
- Song Boo-gun as Goo Gwang-soo, Golden Time dispatch team member
- So Hee-jung as Moo Mi-sook
- Cha Min-ji as Go Ye-ji
- Hong Kyung-in as Na Hyung-joon, Do Kang-woo's partner
- Park Tae-sung
- Joo Min-ha as An Hee-jin

==== Season 3 ====
- Park Byung-eun as Kaneki Masayuki / Woo Jong-woo
- Kwon Yul as Bang Je-soo
- Son Eun-seo as Park Eun-soo, Golden Time Team - Call Team Command Team Leader
- Kim Woo-suk as Jin Seo-yul, Golden Time Team member
- Kim Joong-ki as Park Joong-ki, Golden Time Team member
- Song Boo-gun as Goo Kwang-soo, Golden Time Team member
- Kim Ki-nam as Yang Choon-byung, Golden Time Team member
- Yoo Seung-mok as Na Hong-soo, Violent Crimes Unit Chief
- Han Gab-soo as Yoo Jae-cheon, Poongsan Police Commissioner

Others

- Yang Ye-seung as Kaneki Yukiko
- Jung Ki-seop as Suzuki
- Jung Yi-seo as Kwon Se-young
- Im Byung-gi as Yukiko's father
- Hong Seung-hee as Mi-hye
- Park Dong-ha as Detective Ryoji
- Kim Dae-gon as Seung
- Jung Tae-ya as Jo Young-chun
- Ham Sung-min as Pyo Hyun-soo
- Kim Ji-sung as Yeom Mi-jung
- Carson Allen as Tina
- Yannie Kim as Pertiwi
- Park Myung-shin as Cheon Yoon-mi
- Kim Jin-yeop as Han Cho-rong
- Choi Seung-yoon as Oh Jin-sik (Ep. 7–8)

==== Season 4 ====
- Lee E-dam as Jo Seung-ah, younger sister of Derek Jo
- Lee Kyu-hyung as Dong Bang-min
- Kang Seung-yoon as Han Woo-ju
- Son Eun-seo as Park Eun-soo
- Gil Hae-yeon as Gam Jong-suk
- Baek Sung-hyun as Shim Dae-sik

Other

- Han Jong-hoon as Chad Lee
- Chae Won-bin as Gong Soo-ji
- Jo Hyun-woo as Choi Gong-pil
- Choi Ji-yeon as Gam-soon
- Son Kyung-won as Gong Chan-seok
- Kim Young-hoon as Jang Hyo-jun
- Kim Si-eun as Kwon Saet-byeol
- Shin Soo-hyun as Min Hye-rin
- Cha Se-young as Chae-yoon
- Cho Jae-ryong as Kang Man-ho
- Jang Hang-seon as Dong Bang Heon-yeop

=== Special appearances ===
==== Season 1 ====
- Jo Jae-yoon as triad member (Ep. 1)
- Lee Jun-hyeok as nightclub manager (Ep. 1)
- Park Hyo-jun as police officer
- Kim Yuna as Club Fever DJ (Ep. 9)
- Kim Hyung-kyu as Club Fever manager (Ep. 9)
- Kim Kwon as psychiatric doctor in Sungwun Mental Hospital (Ep. 16)

==== Season 2 ====
- Lee Hae-young as Jang Kyung-hak, deceased Golden Time Dispatch Team Leader (Ep. 1–2)
- Jang Hee-jung as Baek Mi-ja / Wang Ok-ryeo (Ep. 4-5)
- Lee Sang-yi as Wang Ko (Cameraman) (Ep. 6–7)
- Park Eun-seok as Go David (Ep. 6–7)
- Yoo Hae-in as Zombie girl (Ep. 7)
- Lee Jung-shin as Lee Jae-il (using Cricket as an alias), a murderer (Ep. 8)
- Jae Hee as Son Ho-min (Ep. 8–9)

==== Season 3 ====
- Ahn Se-ha as Kwak Dok-ki (Ep. 2–3)
- Heo Sung-tae as informant
- Lee Tae-ri as Tomoyuki (Ep. 2)
- Lee Yong-woo as Fujiyama Koichi

==== Season 4 ====
- Kim Ye-eun as Girl in Ha-eun's story (Ep.2)
- Kwon Yul as Bang Je-soo (Ep.14)

== Production ==
=== Development and casting ===
On November 2, 2017, a source from OCN confirmed production for the second season of Voice. On April 17, 2018, it was confirmed that Lee Ha-na would be reprising her lead female role and Lee Jin-wook would be joining season 2 as the new male lead. OCN announced a third season to be broadcast in the first half of 2019, with Lee Ha-na and Lee Jin-wook confirmed to reprise their roles. The first script reading took place on May 23, 2018, at Studio Dragon in Sangam-dong, Seoul, South Korea. During the press conference of the second season, director Lee Seung-young shared that the season would have 12 episodes as the writer wrote season 2 with season 3 in mind.

In September 2018, OCN officially confirmed a third season scheduled to be broadcast in the first half of 2019. It was later announced that both Lee Ha-na and Lee Jin-wook had confirmed to reprise their roles. The first script reading took place in February 2019 at Studio Dragon in Sangam-dong, Seoul, South Korea.

== Music ==
Singles from Voice (Parts 1–3)

Part 1

Released on February 5, 2017
No.	Title	Artist	Length
1.	"Word Up"	Kim Young-geun	03:13
2.	"Word Up" (Inst.)		03:13

Part 2

Released on February 19, 2017
No.	Title	Artist	Length
1.	"Voice (목소리)"	Kim Yoon-ah	03:45
2.	"Voice" (Inst.)		03:45

Part 3

Released on March 5, 2017
No.	Title	Artist	Length
1.	"My Ears Are Open (내 귀는 열려)"	Changmo	04:18
2.	"My Ears Are Open" (Inst.)		04:18

Voice 2 Special OST

No.	Title	Artist	Length
1.	"목소리" (Voice)	Kim Yeon-ji
2.	"I Got Your Back"	Black Nine
3.	"I Hear You"	Yeseo
4.	"Perfect Asymmetry"	Desolate Circle
5.	"Let Me Hear Your Voice"	myunDo
6.	"Stay There"	Dmeanor
7.	"I Can Hear You (Voice Main Title Metal ver.)"	개미
8.	"Shork"	이성구
9.	"Run Over"	박정환 [창작]
10.	"Devils"	박윤서
11.	"Here I Am"	박미선
12.	"Go to Hell"	이건영
13.	"Mask Man"	개미
14.	"I Can Hear You (Light ver.)"	개미
15.	"Sentimental"	이규옥
16.	"Run Over 2"	박정환 [창작]

=== Season 4 ===
Voice 4

Soundtrack album by Various Artists
- Released: 2021
- Genre: Soundtrack
- Languages: Korean; English
- Labels: Warner Music; Music ground

=== Part 1 ===
Released on June 26, 2021
No.	Title	Lyrics	Music	Artist	Length
1.	"Coming to You"	RGBY	RGBY	GRASS	3:12
2.	"Coming to You" (Inst.)				3:12

=== Part 2 ===
Released on July 2, 2021
No.	Title	Lyrics	Music	Artist	Length
1.	"Your Voice"	Bang Bang-seon, Eo Ji-hye	ELDORADO	Kang Seung-yoon	3:45
2.	"Your Voice" (Inst.)				3:45

=== Part 3 ===
Released on July 10, 2021
No.	Title	Lyrics	Music	Artist	Length
1.	"No Way to Go"	Nuvocity	Nuvocity	KLANG	3:26
2.	"No Way to Go" (Inst.)				3:26

=== Part 4 ===
Released on July 17, 2021
No.	Title	Lyrics	Music	Artist	Length
1.	"Hear for You"	Hong Ji-hyun	Hong Ji-hyun	Elaine	4:00
2.	"Hear for You" (Inst.)				4:00

=== Part 5 ===
Released on July 23, 2021
No.	Title	Lyrics	Music	Artist	Length
1.	"Promise You"	Hana Choi (CLEF), CLEF CREW	Seong-hee Kim (CLEF), Park Soo-yeon (CLEF), CLEF CREW	Kim Jae-hwan	3:12
2.	"Promise You" (Inst.)				3:12

== Reception ==
OCN announced that the VOD rights for "Voice" were sold to 56 countries including the United States, Canada, France, Switzerland, Hong Kong, Singapore, and more.

=== Controversy ===
Halfway airing through the series, the drama was submitted for Korea's censorship board review due to viewers' complaints of it showing excessive violence. It was subsequently issued an advisory warning. OCN then changed its viewing rating from the original of 15+ to 19+ for episodes 11, 12 and 16 in order to make the story as realistic as possible.

=== Viewership ===
Ratings for the first season set new records for OCN dramas when it aired in South Korea, proving to be a hit among viewers. It is one of the highest rated dramas in Korean cable television history and ranked first among cable TV dramas for many consecutive weeks.

Upon its premiere, the second season set the record for the highest premiere rating of an OCN television series. Despite its shorter run, the second season surpassed the first season's ratings and eventually became the highest-rated OCN television series, breaking viewership records previously held by Tunnel (2017).

Voice : South Korea viewers per episode (millions)

Season	Episode number																Average
Season	1	2	3	4	5	6	7	8	9	10	11	12	13	14	15	16	Average
2	1.128	1.362	1.388	1.501	1.502	1.620	0.652	1.499	1.289	1.816	1.650	1.957	–				1.447
3	0.876	1.380	1.064	1.192	1.006	1.438	1.092	1.180	1.079	1.220	0.939	1.177	1.012	1.271	1.060	1.534	1.158
4	0.777	0.915	0.878	0.998	0.955	1.054	0.987	0.994	0.938	1.113	1.027	0.920	0.930	1.251	–		0.981

Source: Audience measurement performed nationwide by Nielsen Media Research.

=== Season 1 ===
Average TV viewership ratings (season 1)
Ep.	Original broadcast date	Title	Average audience share		
Ep.	Original broadcast date	Title	TNmS	AGB Nielsen	
Ep.	Original broadcast date	Title	Nationwide	Nationwide	Seoul
1	January 14, 2017	A Voice in the Dark (어둠 속의 목소리)	1.6%	2.346%	2.397%
2	January 15, 2017	Healing Mother's Two Faces (힐링마마의 두 얼굴)	2.1%	2.986%	2.267%
3	January 21, 2017	Healing Mother's Two Faces (힐링마마의 두 얼굴)	4.9%	5.406%	5.383%
4	January 22, 2017	Dark Generic Bell Sound: The Secret of the Chocolate Box (어둠 속의 벨소리 #초콜릿 상자의 비밀)	2.9%	3.226%	2.967%
5	February 4, 2017	Dark Generic Bell Sound: The Secret of the Chocolate Box (어둠 속의 벨소리 #초콜릿 상자의 비밀)	4.3%	5.339%	5.540%
6	February 5, 2017	Secret of the Trash House: The Pupil in the Wall (쓰레기집의 비밀 #벽속의 눈동자)	3.1%	4.236%	3.130%
7	February 11, 2017	Secret of the Trash House: The Pupil in the Wall (쓰레기집의 비밀 #벽속의 눈동자)	4.4%	4.032%	3.541%
8	February 12, 2017	Secret of the Trash House: The Pupil in the Wall (쓰레기집의 비밀 #벽속의 눈동자)	4.0%	4.663%	4.354%
9	February 18, 2017	Secret of the Trash House: The Pupil in the Wall (쓰레기집의 비밀 #벽속의 눈동자)	4.4%	4.974%	5.380%
10	February 19, 2017	Devil's Whisperer (악마의 속삭임)	4.3%	5.358%	5.956%
11	February 25, 2017	Devil's Whisperer (악마의 속삭임)	4.1%	4.192%	4.396%
12	February 26, 2017	A Call from the Fiery Pit (지옥으로부터 온 전화)	4.3%	4.654%	5.203%
13	March 4, 2017	The Birth of Satan (마왕의 탄생)	4.0%	3.886%	4.061%
14	March 5, 2017	The Birth of Satan (마왕의 탄생)	3.9%	5.132%	4.948%
15	March 11, 2017	For the Last Golden Time (마지막 골든타임을 위하여)	3.4%	4.222%	4.758%
16	March 12, 2017	For the Last Golden Time (마지막 골든타임을 위하여)	4.4%	5.055%	5.601%
Average			3.8%	4.357%	4.368%
In the table above, the blue numbers represent the lowest ratings and the red numbers represent the highest ratings.; This drama aired on a cable channel/pay TV which normally has a relatively smaller audience compared to free-to-air TV/public broadcasters (KBS, SBS, MBC and EBS).; Episodes 5 and 6 were delayed due to a special broadcast for the Korean New Year.

=== Season 2 ===
Average TV viewership ratings (season 2)
Ep.	Original broadcast date	Average audience share		
Ep.	Original broadcast date	AGB Nielsen		TNmS
Ep.	Original broadcast date	Nationwide	Seoul	Nationwide
1	August 11, 2018	3.938%	4.579%	4.2%
2	August 12, 2018	4.699%	5.553%	5.0%
3	August 18, 2018	4.462%	5.165%	4.9%
4	August 19, 2018	4.950%	5.737%	5.8%
5	August 25, 2018	5.156%	5.627%	5.8%
6	August 26, 2018	5.427%	5.599%	6.4%
7	September 1, 2018	2.440%	2.647%	—N/a
8	September 2, 2018	5.119%	5.670%	—N/a
9	September 8, 2018	4.389%	4.526%	—N/a
10	September 9, 2018	6.001%	7.388%	—N/a
11	September 15, 2018	5.506%	5.999%	6.8%
12	September 16, 2018	7.086%	8.275%	8.4%
Average		4.931%	5.564%	— (Note: Due to some ratings not recorded, the exact average rating is unknown.)
In the table above, the blue numbers represent the lowest ratings and the red numbers represent the highest ratings.; N/A denotes that the rating is not known.; This drama aired on a cable channel/pay TV which normally has a relatively smaller audience compared to free-to-air TV/public broadcasters (KBS, SBS, MBC and EBS).

=== Season 3 ===
Average TV viewership ratings (season 3)
Ep.	Original broadcast date	Average audience share (AGB Nielsen)	
Ep.	Original broadcast date	Nationwide	Seoul
1	May 11, 2019	3.174%	4.161%
2	May 12, 2019	4.979%	6.000%
3	May 18, 2019	3.762%	4.656%
4	May 19, 2019	4.477%	5.835%
5	May 25, 2019	3.501%	4.510%
6	May 26, 2019	5.357%	6.529%
7	June 1, 2019	3.862%	5.357%
8	June 2, 2019	4.370%	5.574%
9	June 8, 2019	3.972%	5.149%
10	June 9, 2019	4.441%	5.615%
11	June 15, 2019	3.445%	4.643%
12	June 16, 2019	4.477%	5.863%
13	June 22, 2019	3.885%	5.392%
14	June 23, 2019	4.808%	5.970%
15	June 29, 2019	4.054%	5.509%
16	June 30, 2019	5.517%	6.366%
Average		4.255%	5.446%
In the table above, the blue numbers represent the lowest ratings and the red numbers represent the highest ratings.; This drama aired on a cable channel/pay TV which normally has a relatively smaller audience compared to free-to-air TV/public broadcasters (KBS, SBS, MBC and EBS).

=== Season 4 ===
Average TV viewership ratings (season 4)
Ep.	Original broadcast date	Average audience share (AGB Nielsen)	
Ep.	Original broadcast date	Nationwide	Seoul
1	June 18, 2021	3.155% (2nd)	3.355% (2nd)
2	June 19, 2021	3.205% (2nd)	3.248% (2nd)
3	June 25, 2021	3.391% (1st)	3.728% (1st)
4	June 26, 2021	3.885% (2nd)	4.245% (2nd)
5	July 2, 2021	3.815% (1st)	4.320% (1st)
6	July 3, 2021	3.964% (2nd)	4.142% (2nd)
7	July 9, 2021	3.658% (1st)	4.237% (1st)
8	July 10, 2021	3.685% (2nd)	3.619% (3rd)
9	July 16, 2021	3.227% (1st)	3.393% (1st)
10	July 17, 2021	4.001% (2nd)	4.164% (2nd)
11	July 23, 2021	3.762% (1st)	3.876% (1st)
12	July 24, 2021	3.294% (3rd)	3.345% (3rd)
13	July 30, 2021	3.418% (2nd)	3.509% (2nd)
14	July 31, 2021	4.372%(2nd)	4.513%(2nd)
Average		3.631%	3.835%
In the table above, the blue numbers represent the lowest ratings and the red numbers represent the highest ratings.; This drama aired on a cable channel/pay TV which normally has a relatively smaller audience compared to free-to-air TV/public broadcasters (KBS, SBS, MBC and EBS).

== Awards and nominations ==
Year	Award	Category	Recipient	Result	Ref.
2017	Korean Film Shining Star Awards	Drama Star Award	Jang Hyuk	Won	

== Adaptations ==
A Japanese remake, titled Voice: 110 Emergency Control Room, aired from July 13 to September 19, 2019, on Nippon TV at 22.00 JST

A Thai remake, titled Voice สัมผัสเสียงมรณะ, was aired from November 4, to December 24, 2019, on True4U.
