= Alone in Love =

2006 South Korean television series

- Promotional poster for Alone in Love
- Hangul: 연애시대
- Hanja: 戀愛時代
- RR: Yeonaesidae
- MR: Yŏnaesidae
- Genre: Romance; Melodrama
- Based on: Ren'ai Jidai by Hisashi Nozawa
- Written by: Park Yeon-seon
- Directed by: Han Ji-seung
- Starring: Kam Woo-sung; Son Ye-jin; Gong Hyung-jin; Lee Ha-na
- Country of origin: South Korea
- Original language: Korean
- No. of episodes: 16

Production
- Executive producers: Heo Woong; Oh Nam-seok
- Producer: Koh Kyoung-hee
- Production location: South Korea
- Running time: 60 minutes Mondays and Tuesdays at 21:55 (KST)
- Production company: Yellow Film

Original release
- Network: SBS TV
- Release: April 3 – May 23, 2006

Alone in Love (Korean: 연애시대; lit. 'Love Generation') is a 2006 South Korean television series starring Kam Woo-sung, Son Ye-jin, Gong Hyung-jin, and Lee Ha-na. It is based on the Japanese novel Love Generation (Japanese: 恋愛時代, Hepburn: Ren'ai Jidai) by Hisashi Nozawa, which was published in 1996 and won the 4th Shimase Literary Prize for Romance in 1997, and tells the story of two ordinary people, as they come to terms with their relationship. The series aired on SBS from April 3 to May 23, 2006, on Mondays and Tuesdays at 21:55 (KST) for 16 episodes.

The series won critical acclaim for its subtle and realistic portrayal of love, marriage and divorce.

== Synopsis ==
Yoo Eun-ho (Son Ye-jin) and Lee Dong-jin (Kam Woo-sung) meet one day at the bookstore where Dong-jin works, and are immediately drawn to each other. They fall in love after subsequent meetings, and eventually marry. Two years later, they divorce.

Dong-jin still works at the bookstore, while Eun-ho works at a fitness club. A year and a half after their divorce, the two still meet in their favorite bakery for breakfasts, quarrel over trivial things like a married couple, and eat dinner on their wedding anniversary with a free meal coupon provided by the hotel where they got married. The narrative is punctuated by either character's internal monologue on their past and current relationships, as new love interests enter their lives.

All of this makes them wonder whether these lingering feelings are love, although both are too afraid to start over, and even more afraid to end the relationship completely. With neither brave enough to confront each other about the misunderstanding on the day Eun-ho had a stillborn baby, they are unable to move on.

== Cast ==
Actor	Character	Description
Kam Woo-sung	Lee Dong-jin	33 years old, born in Seoul. He has a laid back personality, and has loved books since he was a child. He works in a major bookstore located in the commercial district. Cool-headed and decisive in his professional life, Dong-jin is indecisive when it comes to his love life. He falls in love with Eun-ho, a customer in his bookstore, and succeeds in winning her heart, but their marriage does not last.
Son Ye-jin	Yoo Eun-ho	29 years old, born in Busan. Eun-ho is a retired swimmer who won national competitions in her prime years as an athlete. She now works as a swimming instructor at a sports center. Outgoing and tomboyish on the outside, she has a feminine sentimentality and a soft heart on the inside. She doesn't like to express her feelings, but is very stubborn once she has made a decision.
Gong Hyung-jin	Gong Jun-pyo	33 years old. A gynecologist in a university hospital, Jun-pyo has been Dong-jin's best friend since elementary school. When Eun-ho was pregnant, he was her gynecologist. He is the only person who knows why the two got divorced. After a traumatic experience, Jun-pyo faints every time one of his patients is giving birth.
Lee Ha-na	Yoo Ji-ho	24 years old. Eun-ho's younger sister. Like Eun-ho, Ji-ho headed to college in Seoul and is now a senior. She has already given up hope of getting a good job because of the high unemployment rate. She has an odd and "alien-like" personality, and plots with Jun-pyo to get her sister back together with Dong-jin.
Moon Jeong-hee	Jung Yoo-kyung	She is a chef, specializing in traditional Korean food. She was Dong-jin's first love in middle school, and after they reconnect years later, they fall for each other and get married.
Oh Yoon-ah	Kim Mi-yeon	29 years old. She is an old friend of Eun-ho's, and has a daughter from a previous marriage. Though attractive, her brittle-like cheerfulness masks an insecurity caused by her divorce.
Lee Jin-wook	Min Hyun-joong	26 years old. Eun-ho's charming stalker is secretly a second-generation chaebol, but decided to turn his back on his father's money.
Seo Tae-hwa	Jung Yoon-soo	38 years old. He is a psychology professor and is taking swimming lessons from Eun-ho to overcome his extreme aquaphobia. Kind and gentle, he gathers the courage one day to ask Eun-ho out.
Go Hye-young	Choi Young-in	Elegant and rich, she and Yoon-soo have a troubled marriage and are currently separated.
Jin Ji-hee	Cho Eun-sol	7 years old. Mi-yeon's daughter. Too solemn and precocious for her age, she unexpectedly bonds with Dong-jin while he's dating her mom.
Ha Jae-sook	Na Yoo-ri	28 years old. She is a pro wrestler and one of Eun-ho's close friends. They often have dinner at a local restaurant where the barman never talks.
Kim Kap-soo	Yoo Ki-young	Eun-ho and Ji-ho's widowed father. He is a pastor and a talk radio host. Eun-ho often calls in anonymously on his show to ask for advice.
Gi Ju-bong	Lee Dae-hoon	Dong-jin's father.

== Production ==
The Korean adaptation was written by Park Yeon-seon (screenwriter for My Tutor Friend and Too Beautiful to Lie). This is the first TV series directed by film director Han Ji-seung (who won a Grand Bell award in 2001 for A Day).

=== Filming locations ===
Most of the filming locations were in Bundang District, Seongnam, Gyeonggi Province. Eun-ho and Ji-ho's house is in Bundang-dong near St. John's Cathedral. Dong-jin's house is the Ewha Villa. The Dunkin' Donuts branch that Dong-jin and Eun-ho frequent is in Jeongja-dong. The hospital where Jun-pyo works is Bundang Jesaeng Hospital near Seohyeon Station. Eun-ho's everyday bike route is along Tancheon Bicycle Road in Imae-dong.

The bookstore where Dong-jin works is the Kyobo Bookstore near Gangnam station. The fitness club where Eun-ho works is the Suwon World Cup Sports Center, behind the Suwon World Cup Stadium. The beach where Dong-jin proposes to Eun-ho is in Jeongdongjin. The Grand Hyatt Seoul is where they have their faux anniversary dinner. Dong-jin's wedding to Yoo-kyung takes place on the Hanriver Land Ferry.

== Soundtrack ==
Album information	Track listing
Alone in Love OST: Released: May 8, 2006; Label: EMI Music Korea Ltd.; Composer: Noh Young-shim	Track listing: 1. Love Is...; 2. 만약에 우리 (Original bossa nova ver) - Jinho; 3. Breeze - Lee Jae-joon; 4. 아무리 생각해도 난 너를; 5. 사랑이 사랑에게 묻다; 6. 사랑이 사랑에게 말하다; 7. 보내지 못한 마음 (The Heart You Can't Send Away) (Piano ver.); 8. 독백; 9. 영국 런던 그리니치 천문대; 10. 나폴리 피자; 11. 우린 이미 끝났는데; 12. 은솔이와 실전화 아저씨 - Lee Jae-joon; 13. 그녀 미소; 14. When I Saw You (내 사랑을 바다에 맹세해,부서지는 파도에 맹세해); 15. I'm Still With You - Jinho; 16. 모빌 박스; 17. 긴 슬픔; 18. 그건 바로 사랑이었을까; 19. 당신의 행운을 돌려드립니다; 20. Frankly Speaking - Choi Woo-hyuk; 21. 만약에 우리 (Samba ver.) - Jinho/Kim Jung-bae; 22. 보내지 못한 마음 (The Heart You Can't Send Away) (Piano & Guitar with Strings); 23. After Love (그 남자의 20kg 감량에 대한 열망); 24. YK259 Zipper; 25. 보내지 못한 마음 (Full ver.)

Album information	Track listing
Alone in Love Special 2CD OST: Released: October 11, 2006; Label: LOEN Entertainment; Composers: Noh Young-shim, Lee Moon-se; CD1	Track listing: 1. 연애란 어른들의 장래희망 같은 것 (That Thing Called Love that Adults Hope for in the Future) - Narration by Eun-ho and Dong-jin; 2. 그때 내가 미처 하지 못했던 말 (The Things I Couldn't Say Back Then) - Lee Moon-se; 3. 사랑을 묻다 (Burying Love) - Narration by Eun-ho; 4. 그대여 안녕 (Goodbye to You) - Cho Won-sun; 5. 사랑은 언제 끝나는 걸까 (When Does Love End?) - Narration by Eun-ho; 6. 첫사랑 (First Love); 7. 아직도 그런가봐 (It Still Must be That Way) (Guitar ver.); 8. 사랑은 사람을 아프게 한다 (Love Hurts People) - Narration by Eun-ho; 9. 슬픔과 함께 걷기 (Walking with Sadness); 10. 고마워 (Thank You) - Son Ye-jin; 11. 어디서부터가 사랑일까 (Since When Was It Love?) - Narration by Dong-jin; 12. 그럼에도 불구하고 운명이었다면... (Still, If It was Fate...) - Narration by Eun-ho; 13. 피클병 (Pickles); 14. 보내지 못한 마음 (The Heart You Can't Send Away) (Guitar ver.); 15. Breeze Up (Samba ver.); 16. 아버지 말씀 (Dad's Words) - Narration by Eun-ho; 17. ...Happy Ending - Narration by Eun-ho; 18. 당신의 연애시대, Love is 2 (Your Age of Love, Love is 2) - Lee Ha-na
Alone in Love Special 2CD OST: Released: October 11, 2006; Label: LOEN Entertainment; Composers: Yoon Jong-shin, Jung Won-young; CD2	Track listing: 1. 비온 뒤 (After the Rain) - Han Choong-wan; 2. Memories of You - Han Choong-wan; 3. 청각장애 (Deaf) - Bremen; 4. 너 때문이야 (It's Because of You) - Bremen; 5. Joy - Seba; 6. Waltz Amabile - Seba; 7. Elegy for Reminiscence - Seba; 8. Flying Free - Seba; 9. Gift - Jung Won-young Band; 10. 내겐 천사 같은 (Like an Angel to Me) - Jung Won-young Band; 11. 사과 (Apology) - Bulldog Mansion; 12. 좋아요 (I Like It) - Bulldog Mansion

== Ratings ==
In this table, the blue numbers represent the lowest ratings and the red numbers represent the highest ratings.

Ep.	Original broadcast date	Average audience share	
Ep.	Original broadcast date	Nationwide	Seoul
1	April 3, 2006	12.9%	14.5%
2	April 4, 2006	11.5%	12.2%
3	April 10, 2006	12.6%	13.4%
4	April 11, 2006	12.9%	14.2%
5	April 17, 2006	12.3%	13.6%
6	April 18, 2006	14.1%	15.8%
7	April 24, 2006	13.1%	14.7%
8	April 25, 2006	13.4%	15.1%
9	May 1, 2006	13.2%	14.8%
10	May 2, 2006	10.9%	11.1%
11	May 8, 2006	14.6%	17.1%
12	May 9, 2006	14.8%	16.9%
13	May 15, 2006	13.5%	15.2%
14	May 16, 2006	14.9%	17.1%
15	May 22, 2006	13.8%	15.7%
16	May 23, 2006	17.4%	19.1%
Average		13.5%	15.0%

Source: TNS Media Korea

== Awards and nominations ==
Year	Award	Category	Recipient	Result
2006	33rd Korean Broadcasting Awards	Best Drama	Alone in Love	Won
2006	33rd Korean Broadcasting Awards	Best Music	Noh Young-shim	Won
2006	SBS Drama Awards	Grand Prize (Daesang)	Kam Woo-sung	Nominated
2006	SBS Drama Awards	Top Excellence Award, Actress	Son Ye-jin	Won
2006	SBS Drama Awards	Best Supporting Actor in a Miniseries	Gong Hyung-jin	Won
2006	SBS Drama Awards	Best Supporting Actress in a Miniseries	Oh Yoon-ah	Won
2006	SBS Drama Awards	Top 10 Stars	Kam Woo-sung	Nominated
2006	SBS Drama Awards	Top 10 Stars	Son Ye-jin	Won
2006	SBS Drama Awards	New Star Award	Lee Jin-wook	Won
2006	SBS Drama Awards	New Star Award	Lee Ha-na	Won
2007	43rd Baeksang Arts Awards	Best Drama	Alone in Love	Nominated
2007	43rd Baeksang Arts Awards	Best Director	Han Ji-seung	Nominated
2007	43rd Baeksang Arts Awards	Best Actress	Son Ye-jin	Won
2007	43rd Baeksang Arts Awards	Best New Actress	Lee Ha-na	Nominated
2007	40th WorldFest-Houston International Film Festival	Platinum Remi Award (Series - Dramatic category)	Alone in Love	Won

== International broadcast ==
The series aired in Japan on Hallyu cable channel KNTV in April 2007. It also aired in the United States with English subtitles on MHz WorldView in January 2010.

In Thailand, the series aired on Channel 7 from September 13, 2008, to November 2, 2008, on Saturdays and Sundays from 09:15 to 11:00 (ICT).
