= Choo Soo-hyun =

South Korean actress (born 1988)

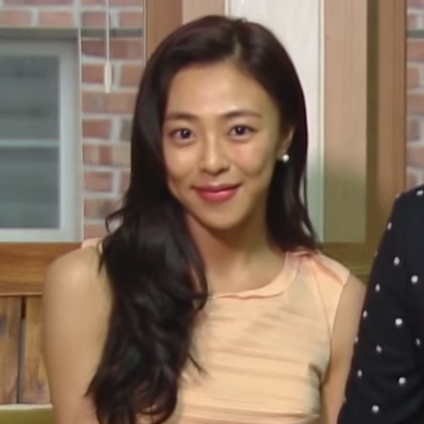
- Choo in 2015
- Born: March 5, 1988 (age 38); Gwangju, South Korea
- Occupations: Actress; model
- Agent: Popeye Entertainment

Korean name
- Hangul: 추수현
- RR: Chu Suhyeon
- MR: Ch'u Suhyŏn

Choo Soo-hyun (Korean: 추수현; born March 5, 1988) is a South Korean actress.

== Filmography ==
=== Television series ===
Year	Title	Role	Network
2013	7th Grade Civil Servant		MBC
2014	Gap Dong	Oh Young-Ae	tvN
2014	Pinocchio	Im Jae-Hwan	SBS
2015	The Time We Were Not in Love	Lee So-Eun	SBS
2017	The King in Love	Ok Boo-Yong	MBC
2018	Grand Prince	Cho Yo-kyung	TV Chosun

=== Music video appearances ===
Year	Song title	Artist
2014	"Winter Night"	Kim Woo-Joo
