= Nemureru Mori =

- Kanji: 眠れる森
- Created by: Nozawa Hisashi
- Directed by: Isamu Nakae
- Starring: Miho Nakayama; Takuya Kimura
- Country of origin: Japan
- No. of episodes: 12

Production
- Running time: approx. 48 mins each episode

Original release
- Network: Fuji TV
- Release: 8 October – 24 December 1998

Nemureru Mori (眠れる森; "A Sleeping Forest") is a drama that aired on Fuji TV. It first aired in Japan from 8 October 1998 to 24 December 1998.

It is written by Nozawa Hisashi, starring Miho Nakayama and Takuya Kimura, and features music by Mariya Takeuchi (Theme song – Camouflage) and U2 (With or Without You).

== Cast ==
- Miho Nakayama as Minako Oba
- Takuya Kimura as Naoki Ito
- Tōru Nakamura as Kiichiro Hamazaki
- Mieko Harada as Makiko Hamazaki
- Takanori Jinnai as Yoshiharu Kokubu

== Synopsis ==
Oba Minako, a girl who seems to remember losing her family in the past, is preparing for her impending marriage with Kiichiro when she finds some old, forgotten letters she received as a child. In these letters a small boy asks her to come to the sleeping forest to meet her at a certain date when they are grown up. She notices that the date is almost upon her and she decides to visit the sleeping forest in her old home town. Once there, she meets a mysterious young man, Naoki Ito, who seems to know everything about her, even things she has forgotten, herself. Shocked, she leaves her childhood place and tries to forget all about the incident only to find out that the young man has followed her and is now her new neighbour. It seems that she has attracted a stalker, not knowing that knowing Naoki will reveal a terrible secret of her past and puts her into mortal danger. As the story runs, Minako starts to recall things that have been long buried in her sleeping memory – the slaughter of her family, the person that murdered them, and complex connection between her, Naoki, and even her boyfriend, Kiichiro, in the past.
