= Pangyo, Seongnam =

Planned district of Seongnam, South Korea

Coordinates: 37°23′47″N 127°06′07″E

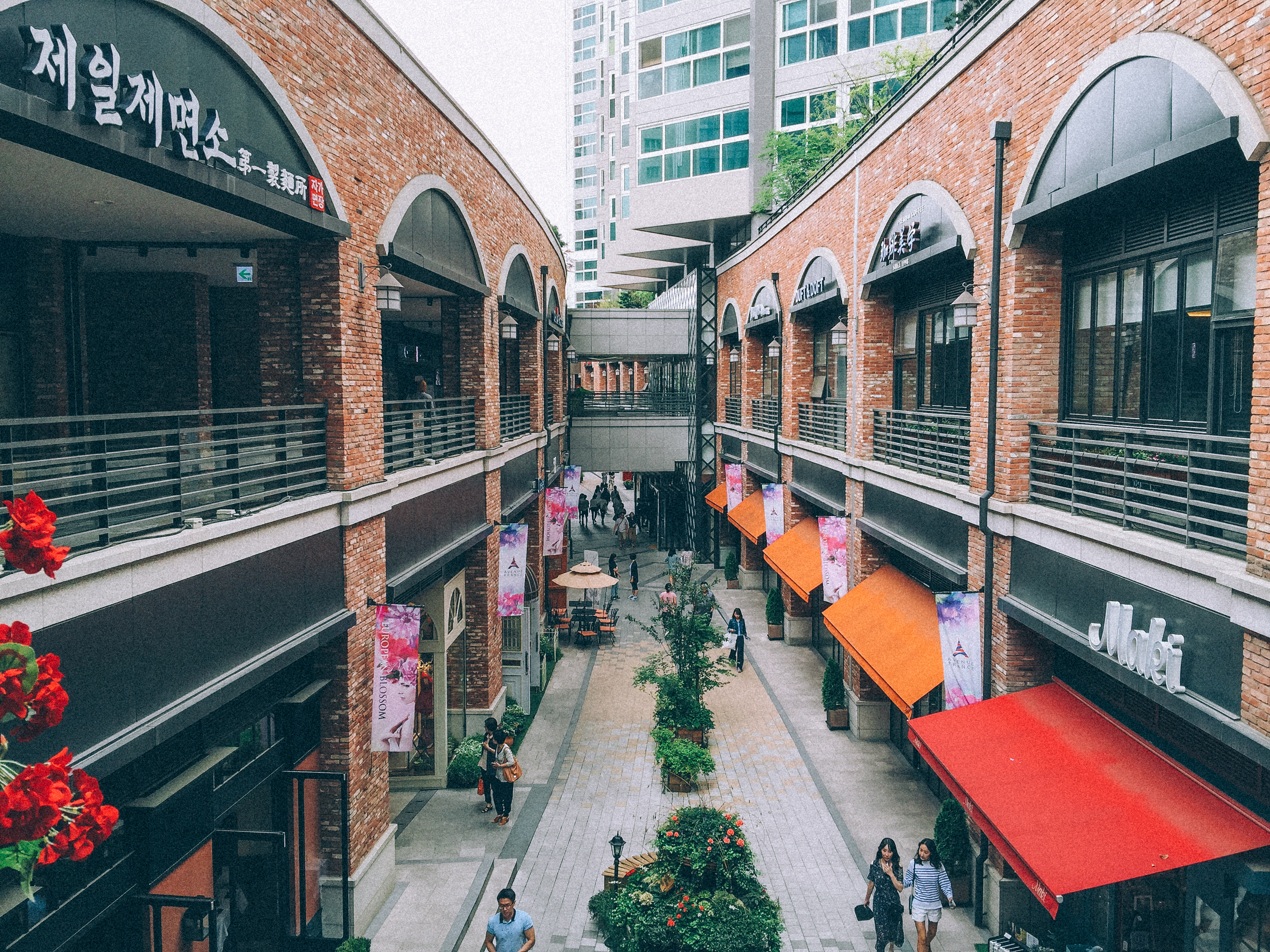
Pangyo's Avenue France shopping plaza

Pangyo (Korean: 판교; Hanja: 板橋) or Pangyo New Town is a planned district composed of several dongs or neighborhoods of Seongnam, South Korea. It contains Pangyo-dong, Baekhyeon-dong, Unjung-dong, and Sampyeong-dong of Bundang District and Siheung-dong and Sasong-dong of Sujeong District (Seongnam).

The area is surrounded by the mountains Cheonggyesan and Geumtosan to the North and Barasan to the south, with Unjungcheon and Geumtocheon, tributaries of Tancheon, flowing through the center of the city.

This area is 9,307,000 m^{2} (2,815,000 pyeong) and can hold up to 80,412 people with 29,350 families.

Gyeongbu Expressway separates the town into two unofficial regions: Seopangyo (literally, West Pangyo) and Dongpangyo (literally, East Pangyo).

== Origin ==
The origin of the name of Pangyo (Board Footbridge) was 'Neodeori' or 'Neoldari', meaning a footbridge made of planks of wood over the Unjungcheon (Cloud Staying Brook) which runs west to east in front of Pangyo, which according to the historical record, in which Pangyo was written in Chinese characters. According to Sinjŭng Tongguk yŏji sŭngnam, a survey of Korean geography published in the Joseon Dynasty, in 1530, Pangyo-won, Yeokwon-gun, Gwangju-mok were recorded as being 45 ri to the south of the state. Therefore, it can be determined that the use of the place name Pangyo traces back to the early Joseon Dynasty.

It has been said that the place name Naksaeng (Pleasant Life) in Naksaeng-myun in Pangyo has its origins in either Nakseong from the Nakseong Market or Nakseong (Defeated Castle) in that a king surrendered after hearing the news that Sea-gyu Jeong, a soldier in Chungju who was marching north to protect Namhansanseong Fortress was defeated at Pangyo. However, in the description of Gwangju-mok in Sinjŭng Tongguk yŏji sŭngnam, there is a mention of the governor of Gwangju-mok being Hwa-boo Paek, who arrived at the settlement at Naksaeng on his way home in April 1349. This is also in Gok Yi's travel account during the reign of King Chungjeong. Therefore, the place name Naksaeng originated during the Goryeo period.

== Background ==
Pangyo was approved for development in 2001 to alleviate the excessive demand for apartments in Gangnam and central Bundang. The district was made eco-friendly with the lowest population density among newly developed districts. Pangyo was designed with large green spaces and parks abutting its streams. Waste facilities, energy plants, and sewage treatment facilities in the community were built with green technology to maximize energy efficiency.

World-class medical centers with the most advanced medical technology such as Seoul National University Hospital, Samsung Medical Center, and Hyundai Asan Medical Center are located near Pangyo.

Construction of the town began in December 2003, and phase 1 and phase 2 were completed in December 2009 and December 2010, respectively. However, construction projects such as Pangyo Techno Valley and the Alpha Dome city are still in progress.

== Transportation ==
Gyeongbu Expressway, Seoul Ring Expressway, and Yongin-Seoul Expressway pass through Pangyo. These three expressways are accessible through the Pangyo Interchange (Gyeongbu Expressway) and Seopangyo Interchange (Yongin-Seoul Expressway), as well as through the Gyeongbu Expressway and Seoul Ring Expressway intersect at Pangyo Junction, located closeby. The Bundang-Naegok City Expressway and the Bundang-Suseo City Expressway, which connect the suburbs of Bundang and Yongin to Southern Seoul, pass through Dongpangyo.

Pangyo Station on the Shinbundang Line opened for service to the public on October 28, 2011. This subway line enables access to Gangnam within 15 minutes. In 2016, Pangyo became the terminal station for the Gyeonggang Line. The Seongnam-Yeoju Line is one of three sections of the main-line railway that connects the cities of Seongnam and Mungyeong. It was completed in 2016.

== Education ==
Since Pangyo is in Seongnam, High School Equalization Policy, (고교평준화제도) governs education there.

The Korea International School and Seongnam Foreign Language High school (성남외국어고등학교) are located in Baekhyeon-dong, a neighborhood of Pangyo.

In total, Pangyo has 19 schools, including 8 primary schools, 6 middle schools, and 6 high schools.

Pangyo also has a library, located at Pangyo-dong 533.

== Economy ==
Pangyo Techno Valley, the Academy of Korean Studies, the Korea Food Research Institute, the Korea Petroleum Management Institute, and the Daehan Oil Pipeline Corporation are all located in Pangyo. IT companies like NHN, Nexon, Ahnlab and SK Planet have their headquarters in Techno Valley, while many others such as Kakao have a presence there.

Pangyo has been described by CNN as South Korea's Silicon Valley.

== Culture ==
=== Pangyo Museum ===
Pangyo Museum opened in April 2013 featuring a variety of exhibitions related to Pangyo's development.

=== Avenue France ===
Avenue France is a shopping plaza in Pangyo known for its cafes and restaurants.

=== La Street ===
La Street is a shopping plaza in Pangyo next to Pangyo Station.

== Pangyo Hyundai Department Store ==
The Hyundai Department Store Pangyo location, which opened on 21 August 2015, is the largest luxury department store in the Seoul metropolitan area. It features the largest food court in Korea.

== See also ==
- Pangyo Techno Valley
