= Baekhyeon-dong =

Neighborhood in Seongnam, South Korea

- Hangul: 백현동
- Hanja: 柏峴洞
- RR: Baekhyeon-dong
- MR: Paekhyŏn-dong

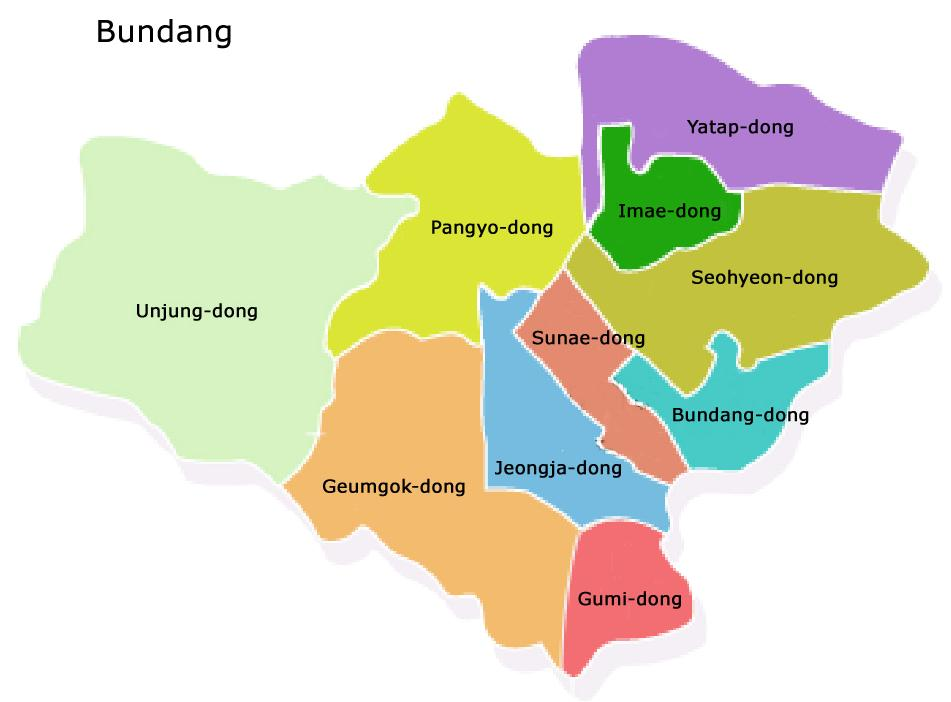
Administrative Divisions of Bundang

Baekhyeon-dong (Korean: 백현동) is a dong of Bundang district in the city of Seongnam, Gyeonggi Province, South Korea. As of January 1, 2024, the population of Baekhyeon-dong is 26,873, spanning 10,431 households. It comprises 1.58 km^{2} or 1.12% of Bundang-gu. In July 1973, it was upgraded from Baekhyeon-ri (백현리; 柏峴里) to Baekhyeon-dong. Baekhyeon derives its name from a large pine tree on the ridge of the hill behind the village, and gradually it became the name of the village.

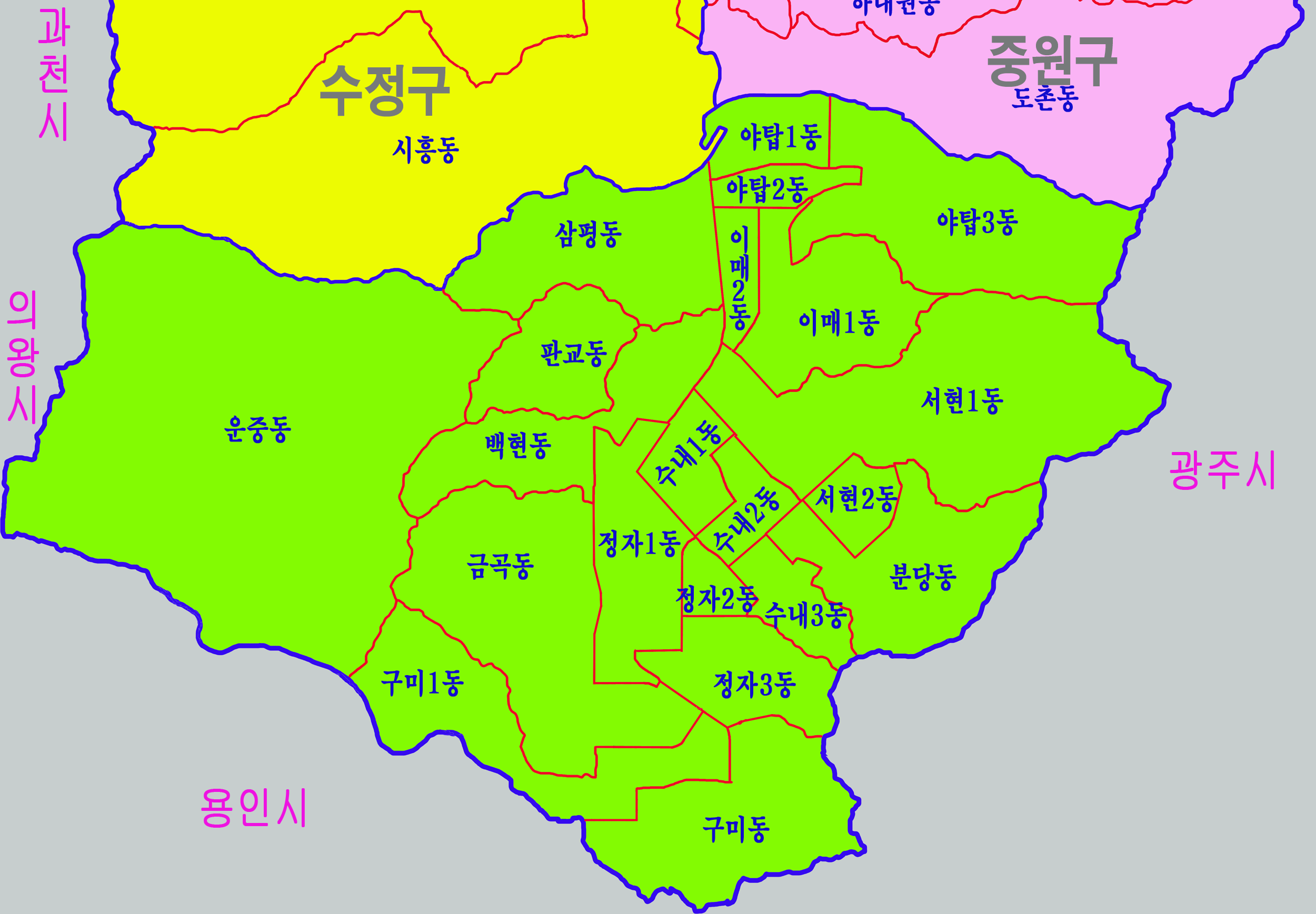
Korean administrative map of Bundang-gu with Baekyeon-dong included; it is on the southern side of Pangyo-dong in the English map.

== Education ==
Baekhyeon-dong is home to the following educational institutions:

- Bopyeong Elementary School [ko] (보평초등학교; 洑坪初等學校)
- Seongnam Hwarang Elementary School [ko] (성남화랑초등학교; 城南화랑初等學校)
- Shinbaekhyun Elementary School [ko] (신백현초등학교; 新柏峴初等學校)
- Shinbaekhyun Middle School [ko] (신백현중학교; 新柏峴中學校)
- Bopyeong Middle School [ko] (보평중학교; 洑坪中學校)
- Bopyeong High School [ko] (보평고등학교; 洑坪高等學校)
- Seongnam Foreign Language High School (성남외국어고등학교; 城南外國語高等學校)
- Korea International School Pangyo Campus
