= Korea International School =

Korea International School may refer to:

- Korea International School (South Korea), an Anglophone international school with campuses in South Korea
  - Korea International School, Jeju Campus, their Jeju branch
- Korea International School (Japan), a Korean international school in Osaka

== See also ==
- Korean International School (disambiguation)
