= Pangyo-dong =

Neighborhood in Seongnam, South Korea

Coordinates: 37°23′N 127°06′E

- Hangul: 판교동
- Hanja: 板橋洞
- RR: Pangyo-dong
- MR: P'an'gyo-dong

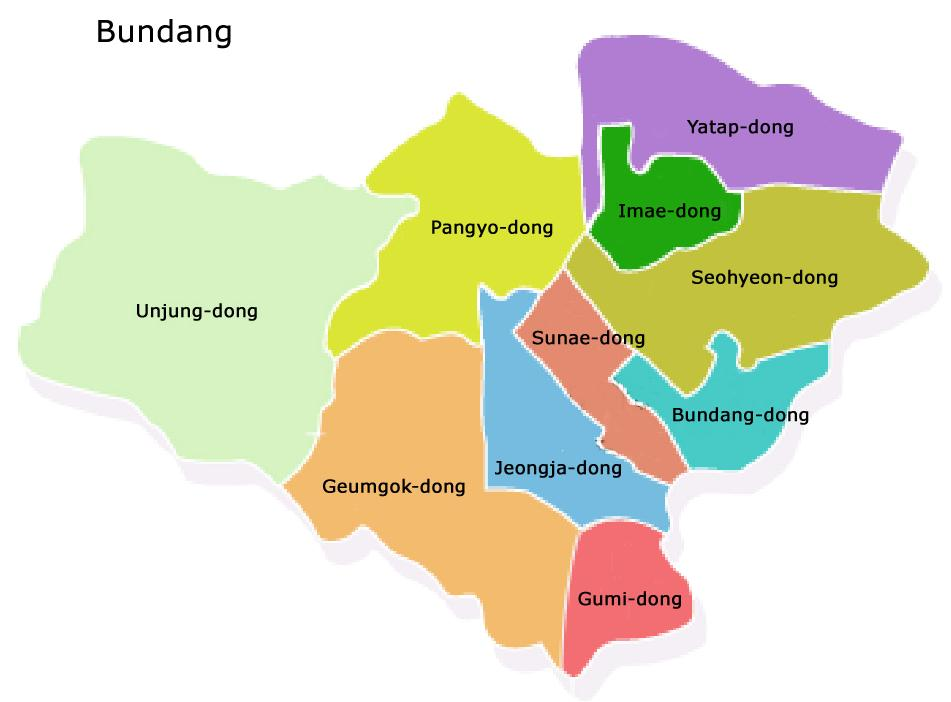
Administrative Divisions of Bundang

Pangyo-dong (Korean: 판교동) is a dong of Bundang district in the city of Seongnam, Gyeonggi Province, South Korea. As of June 30, 2024, Pangyo-dong has a population of 26,555, spanning 9,025 households. It comprises 4.53km^{2} or 3.2% of Bundang-gu. Pangyo-dong is in the center of Pangyo New Town, a planned district where Pangyo Techno Valley, South Korea's Silicon Valley, is located, which is itself a bustling hub for the country's video game industry.

== Name ==
Pangyo is derived from a wide plank bridge over the river Unjungcheon, which flows east from the foot of Guksabong and ends in Tancheon. Residents originally called it Neoldari (널다리), which gradually changes to Neodeuri (너더리), and in hanja it is written as '板橋', which became the name of the place, sharing its etymology with Itabashi in Tokyo, Japan, as well as Banqiao District in New Taipei City of Taiwan; for the latter, the pronunciation of Banqiao in Taiwanese Hokkien (Pe̍h-ōe-jī: Pang-kiô) is extremely similar to Pangyo.

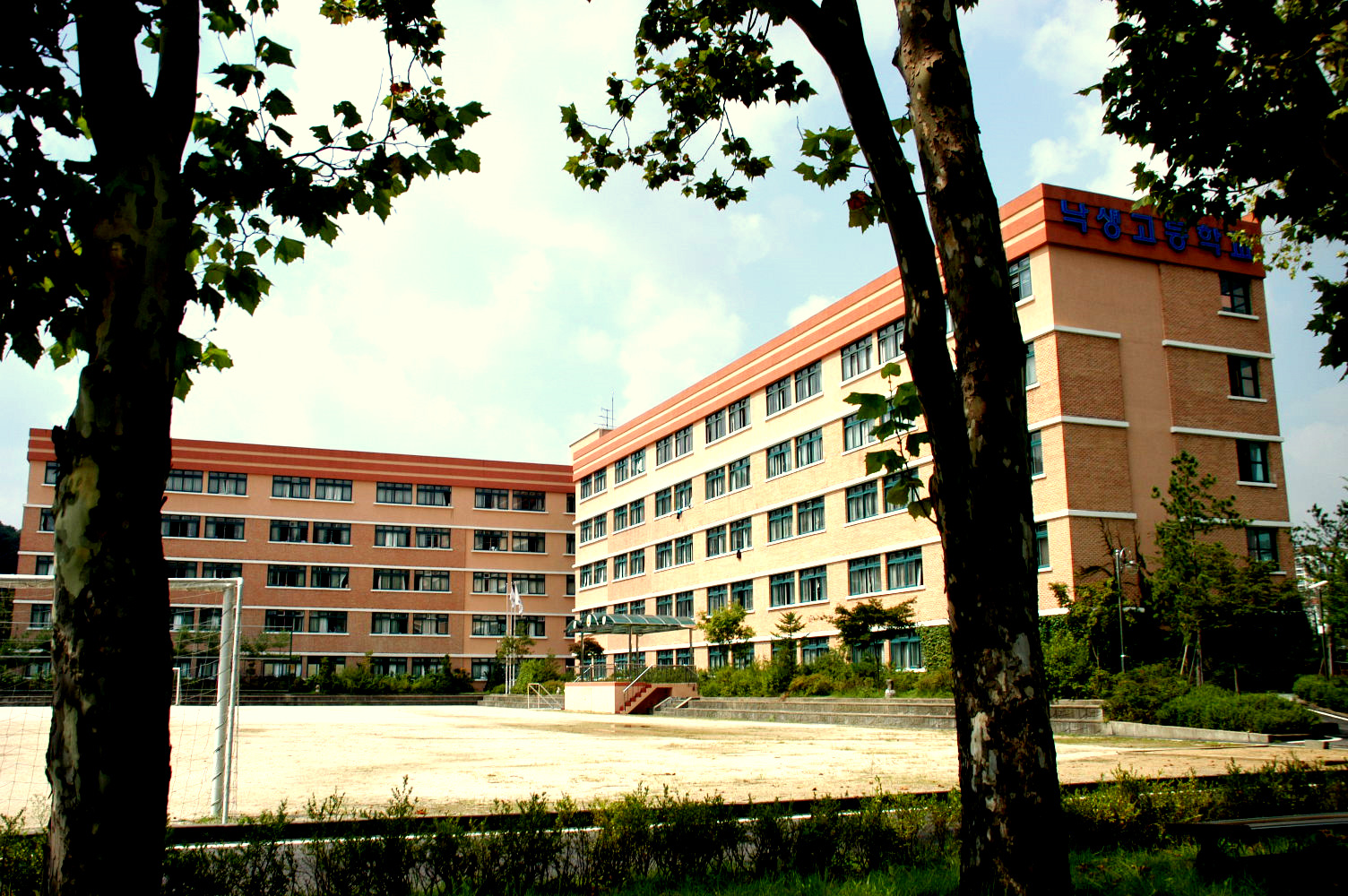
Naksung High School, a private high school in Pangyo-dong.

== Education ==
Pangyo is home to the following educational institutions:

- Pangyo Elementary School [ko] (판교초등학교; 板橋初等學校)
- Naksung Elementary School [ko] (낙생초등학교; 樂生初等學校)
- Pangyo Middle School [ko] (판교중학교; 板橋中學校)
- Nakwon Middle School [ko] (낙원중학교; 樂園中學校)
- Naksung High School [ko] (낙생고등학교; 樂生高等學校)

== Institutions ==
- Korea Petroleum Quality & Distribution Authority [ko], reorganized as K-Petro. Established in November 1983 by the now-dissolved Ministry of Knowledge Economy [ko] (지식경제부; 知識經濟部), it is a quasi-governmental agency which is responsible for quality and distribution management, research and development, testing and investigation of petroleum and alternative fuels.

Pangyo-dong is often referred to as the Silicon Valley of South Korea, as many technological companies like Smilegate and Kakao reside there.
