= Jeju Free International City Development Center =

The Jeju Free International City Development Center (JDC) is a special corporation, established for simultaneously pursuing publicity and business feasibility to successfully implement Jeju Free International City development projects under the South Korean government's Special Act on Jeju Free International City. The corporation is affiliated with the Ministry of Construction and Transportation as a government-sponsored organization.

It is currently pursuing businesses activities related to Jeju Free International City Development promotion projects including attraction of domestic and foreign investment for business promotion core projects, public relations and marketing activities for investment attraction, and operation of duty-free shopping center.

Chairman of the Jeju Free International City Development Center is Kim Han-wook, the former Deputy Governor for Administrative Affairs of Jeju Special Self-Governing Province.

It is headquartered at Jeju Science Park, Elite Bldg. Cheomdanro 213–4, Jeju-City, Jeju Special Self-Governing Province.

== Jeju Global Education City (JGEC) ==
The province will provide English education services in order to present a viable alternative to overseas (language) study and thereby contribute to the development of a free international city where English is commonly used.

July 2013, The province has confirmed to extend the development duration of JGEC from 2015 - 2021, as well as to adjust the number of schools to house seven integrated schools. Moreover, an English language complex with all cultural, leisure and sports facilities would be built to make JGEC to be education hub in North East Asia.

Location: Daejeong-eup area, Seogwipo City

Scale: 3,792,042 m^{2}

Period of Project: 2008 - 2021

=== Major Facilities ===
International schools (kindergarten to high school), foreign educational institutions, cultural and arts complex, English education center, residential and commercial facilities

=== Korea International School, Jeju Campus (KISJ) ===
Korea International School Jeju Campus, opened in September 2011 as a sister boarding school to Korea International School in Seoul.

- Co-educational day and boarding school

- Grades: PK–12

- Enrollment: 906 (August 2016)

- Educational Programs: standards-based American curriculum, with Advanced Placement (AP) starting in Grade 10

=== North London Collegiate School Jeju (NLCS Jeju) ===
On August 4, 2010, Jeju Free International City Development Center (JDC) held the ground-breaking ceremony for NLCS Jeju, a South Korean campus of U.K.'s leading private school, North London Collegiate School (NLCS). NLCS Jeju is the first private international school established in JGEC. It opened on September 26, 2011, and its opening ceremony was held on September 30, 2011. NLCS Jeju's first-ever graduating ceremony took place on June 21, 2014, in which Class of 2014 got offers from some of the world's most prestigious universities, including Oxbridge, UCL (University College London), Kings' College, LSE (London School of Economics and Political Science) and else in the UK, and the Ivy League in the U.S. Class of 2015 has also achieved high IB grades, thus attaining successful university admittance results worldwide.

- Co-educational day and boarding school

- Grades: Junior School (Reception-Year 6), Senior School (Year 7-11), Sixth Form (Year 12-13)

- Enrollment: 1,508

- Educational Programs: equivalent to NLCS in London, IGCSE and Pre-IB / IB Diploma Programme offered

=== Branksome Hall Asia (BHA) ===
On June 30, 2011, Branksome Hall Asia, one of Canada's most renowned private girls' schools, held a ground-breaking ceremony on Jeju Island, South Korea.

On October 15, 2012, Branksome Hall Asia opened, welcoming its first 310 students and held its official opening ceremony on October 29. The opening of Branksome Hall Asia has added momentum for Jeju Global Education City (JGEC) to become a truly global educational hub.

- Grades: PYP (Primary Years Program, PK-Year 6), MYP (Middle Years Program, Year 7-10), DP (Diploma Program, Year 11-12)

- Enrollment: 1,212

- Educational Programs: equivalent to Branksome Hall in Toronto, IB Diploma Program offered

=== St. Johnsbury Academy Jeju (SJA Jeju) ===
In November 2012, Jeju Free International City Development Center (JDC) signed the final agreement with St. Johnsbury Academy to establish and operate an international school in Jeju Global Education City (JGEC). St. Johnsbury Academy, a prestigious US private school with a 170-year tradition, will open a campus on Jeju in September 2017. The school will accommodate 1,250 male and female students in grades 4-12.

== Healthcare Town ==
It will include rehabilitation and alternative medical centers, water parks, general hospitals, special hospitals, long-term care facilities and medical research complex.

Location: Seogwipo-si

Scale:1.48 million m^{2}

Period of Project: 2008 ~ 2018

Major Facilities

1) Wellness Park Stage 1: Development of medical/recreational complex specializing in health care and relaxation (health care centers, rehabilitation/alternative medical centers, riding park, attractive patient/visitor accommodation)

2) Medical Park Stage 2: Development of a composite medical complex capable of providing high-tech medical services (branches of prominent general hospitals, special-care hospitals, long-term care facilities)

3) R&D Park Stage 3: Development of medical research complex where bio-medical research and research on medical care are possible (anti-aging research center, bio-research center, drug research center)

Seowoo consortium

JDC selected 'Seowoo consortium' as the preferred bidder for elements of the Jeju Healthcare Town project on December 7, 2011.

SickChildren (Canada)

JDC signed MOU with Hospital for SickChildren on January 16, 2012, in Toronto, Canada.

Greenland Group (China)

JDC signed a memorandum of understanding (MOU) with Greenland Group, based in Shanghai, China, on December 23, 2011. The MOU states that Greenland Group will exclusively build facilities at the Wellness Park and R&D Park within Jeju Healthcare Town.

JDC signed a memorandum of agreement (MOA) with Greenland Group in Shanghai, China, to attract investment to the Jeju Healthcare Town project on July 11, 2012. Under the agreement, Greenland Group will build a medical R&D center, recreational and cultural facilities, and accommodations, investing some KRW1 trillion on approximately 778,000 square meters of JHT's 1.54 million-square-meter site.

On October 30, 2012, JDC held a groundbreaking ceremony at the Jeju Healthcare Town site in Seogwipo City to start construction of Greenland Jeju Healthcare Town. Greenland Korea Investment & Development LLC, founded by Green Group, hosted the ceremony. The development plan includes recreational condominiums in the first phase; Wellness Mall, Well-being Food Zone, and Healing Garden in the second phase; and R&D and anti-aging centers in the third phase. The Jeju Healthcare Town (JHT) project now moves to the visible achievement stage with the groundbreaking ceremony.

== Jeju Science Park ==
JDC is developing a Jeju science park that will combine education, research and business incubation support functions for knowledge-based industries such as information communication and bioengineering.

Location: Ara-dong, Jeju-si

Scale: 1,093,527 m^{2}

Period of Project: 2003 ~ 2021

Major Facilities

1) Type of business eligible: IT-and BT-related high-tech manufacturing and research center, natural science research and development, IT industry

2) Major facilities: International schools, plus production and business support facilities, neighborhood amenities

== Resort-type Residential Complex ==
JDC is developing a resort-type residential complex, Berjaya Jeju Airest City, integrating residential, leisure, and medical functions to foster an eco-friendly high value-added leisure and tourism industry. The plan for Berjaya Jeju Airest City is to build a luxury resort town under a project led by Berjaya Jeju Resort, a joint venture established in 2008 between Malaysia-based Berjaya Group and JDC. On March 7, JDC's efforts led to a ground-breaking ceremony for Berjaya Jeju Airest City, which is scheduled to complete construction in 2017.

-Project Concept: "Creative Business Leisure City"

-Project Area: 744,207 m^{2} (183 acres) in Yerae-dong Seogwipo-si

-Project Period: 2003 – 2017 (scheduled to be completed)

-Project Budget: US$2.3 billion (2.7 trillion won)

-Planned Facilities: Recreation accommodations (hotels, villas, condos, additional leisure facilities), commercial facilities (restaurant district, shopping centers), theaters, casinos, health & medical centers and spa resorts

As of the current date, development on this complex has stopped with no residents and all housing unfinished.

== Myths and History Theme Park ==
JDC is creating a theme park resort where visitors can experience the cultures and legends of countries across the globe as well as the world of movies

Location: Seogwang-ri, Andeok-myeon, Seogwipo-si

Scale: 4 million m^{2}

Period of Project: 2004 ~ 2018

Major Facilities

1) A zone (1.95 million m^{2}): An entertainment destination combining the movie Theme Park, Water Park, a tourist attraction and Downtown Tammora, a catch-of-the-day restaurant

2) H zone (581,177 m2): A theme park designed to feature the food and cultures of several countries, including attractions such as China Town and Europe, U.S., and Southeast Asia Zones.

3) J zone (1.46 million m^{2}): As a theme park combining myths and historical elements, it is divided up into four zones: Promenade, Corealand, Tamlaland and World of Legends

4) Aerospace Museum: Development of experiential aerospace museum with various exhibits and simulation such as aerospace history hall, space hall, observatory, 4D theater (open in 2013)

Jeju Aerospace Museum

Jeju Aerospace Museum opened on April 24, 2014.

== Seogwipo Tourism Port ==
JDC is developing a sea port at Seogwipo.

Location: Seogwipo port area, Seogwipo-si

Scale: 198,000 m^{2}

Period of Project: 2003 ~ 2013

Major Facilities

1) Saeseom island promenade, pedestrian bridge to Saeseom island, water-friendly shore, renovation of pedestrian promenade, renovation of parking lot at Cheonjiyeon waterfall, renovation of Chilsipri bridge, visitor information center, mall and National Federation of Fisheries Cooperatives, redevelopment of the rear of tourism port, driveway/theme street
