= JDC =

JDC can refer to:

- American Jewish Joint Distribution Committee, a worldwide relief organization
- Jeju Free International City Development Center
- John Deere Classic, a PGA Tour golf tournament
- John Dickson Carr (1906–1977), American mystery writer
- Johnny Dango Curtis, American professional wrestler
- Juvenile detention center
- JDC Welfare Organization
- JDC MotorSports, an American auto racing team
