= Korean International School =

Korean International School may refer to:

- Korean International School in Beijing, China
- Korean International School, HCMC, Ho Chi Minh City, Vietnam
- Korean International School of Hong Kong
- Korean International School Philippines
- Korean International School in Shenzhen, China

== See also ==
- Korea International School (disambiguation)
- Category:International schools in South Korea
