= Branksome Hall Asia =

Private school in Seogwipo, South Korea

Coordinates: 33.2904498°N 126.2854768°E

- 브랭섬홀아시아

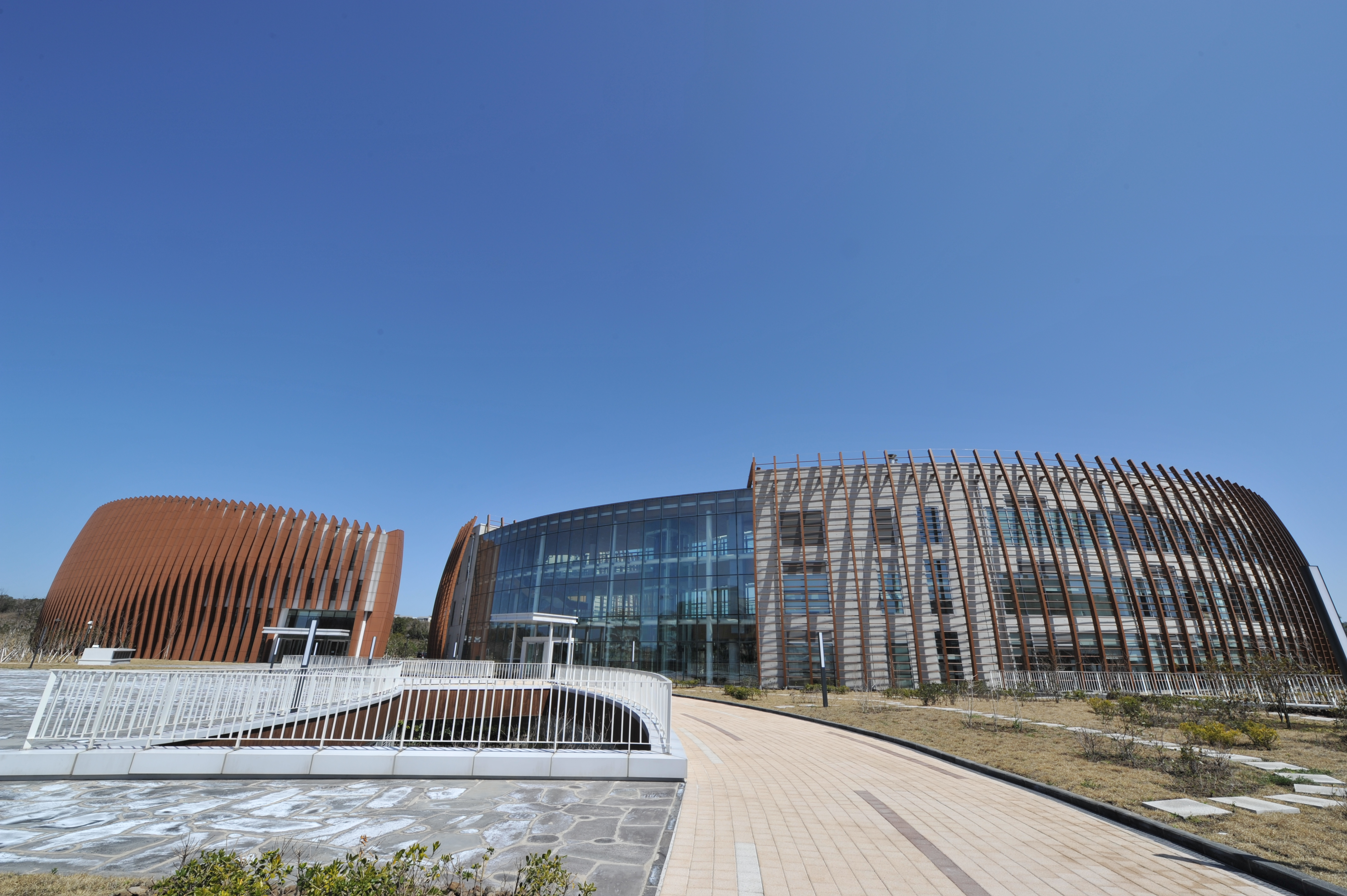

Location
- 234 Global Edu-ro, Daejeoung-eup, Seogwipo City, Jeju Special Self-Governing Province; South Korea

Information
- Type: Private International Day/Boarding
- Motto: Each day, we challenge and inspire students to love learning and to shape a better world.
- Established: October 2012
- Category: International School
- Principal: Dr. Blair Lee
- Grades: Kindergarten prep–12
- Gender: Co-education
- Website: www.branksome.asia

Branksome Hall Asia (BHA) is an independent educational institution in Seogwipo, Jeju Province, South Korea. The institution opened in October 2012 and is the city campus of the Canadian school Branksome Hall.

== Overview ==
Branksome Hall Asia is an co-educational international school starting from Junior Kindergarten Prep to Grade 12. In 2023, Branksome Hall Asia welcomed boys into its student body. The school employs a diamond model of education: students are integrated in the Junior School, separated during Middle School, and then come together again in High School. The school is a sister school of Branksome Hall of Toronto. Branksome Hall of Toronto has an exchange program open to Grade 9 students to study and learn in South Korea. Branksome Hall Asia graduates can apply to universities in Korea as well as international post-secondary institutions.

== History ==
In 1903, Branksome Hall was started in Toronto, Canada. In March 2009, Branksome Hall Toronto and the Korean government held a meeting regarding the establishment of a sister school (Branksome Hall Asia), in Jeju Global Education City. Jeju Global Education City is a project run by the South Korean government to create an area of mainly international private schools. During a ceremony held at the Branksome Hall Toronto campus, Branksome Hall signed a Cooperative Venture Agreement. Following this, Branksome Hall Toronto started to make preparations for the establishment of Branksome Hall Asia. By 2012, Branksome Hall Asia started its first year in Jeju-do, South Korea.

== Curriculum ==
The school teaches the International Baccalaureate Program in three stages: primary for children under 12, middle years for children aged 13–17, and diploma for students aged 17–19.

== Student exchange program ==
As a part of the Branksome Hall Asia curriculum, Grade 9 students have the opportunity for a study abroad experience. It is a three weeks' program in which Branksome Hall and Branksome Hall Asia collaborate. It starts in March and Branksome Hall students spend a week in Branksome Hall Asia Campus.

=== Facilities ===
Branksome Hall Asia is located in Jeju Island. Its campus is in the Jeju Global Education City (JGEC), a Jeju Free International City Development Center project with four different international schools. BHA was designed by Singaporean architect Phan Pit Li. The campus includes a Wellness Center that houses the cafeteria, the Olympic Aquatic Center, a hockey rink, a huge gymnasium with floor to ceiling windows, two yoga studios, an exercise room, and other recreational facilities. The classrooms have a large touch screen televisions and video cameras for students to study and review their lectures. The design and technology studios in BHA have 3D printers and other machines which don't exist in Korea. There are three cylinder-shaped buildings for elementary, middle, and high school. The whole campus is connected through tunnels so that students can go from the tunnel even if the weather is bad. However, the only part of the building not connected to the tunnel is the Wellness Center. There are sport facilities such as 50m of swimming pool, tennis court, soccer pitch, golf driving range and putting green, wellness center, and hockey field to have athletics program. BHA students have access to these facilities. Also, there is a performing art center with an auditorium, a recital room, black box theatres, TV studio, audio recording studio and dance studio.

== See also ==
- Jeju Free International City Development Center
