= Pangyo Techno Valley vent collapse =

2014 fatal accident in South Korea

Coordinates: 37.401849°N 127.106645°E

Pangyo Techno Valley Vents Collapse
- Location: Pangyo Techno Valley, South Korea
- Type: crushed by underground car park ventilation cover
- Deaths: 16
- Injuries: 11

The Pangyo Techno Valley vent collapse was an accident in Pangyo Techno Valley, South Korea on 17 October 2014, when 16 spectators at a nearby concert fell to their deaths when an underground car park ventilation cover collapsed. Approximately 700 people were in the park to watch the band 4minute perform.
