= Pangyo Techno Valley =

Place in Seongnam, South Korea

Coordinates: 37.399826°N 127.106507°E

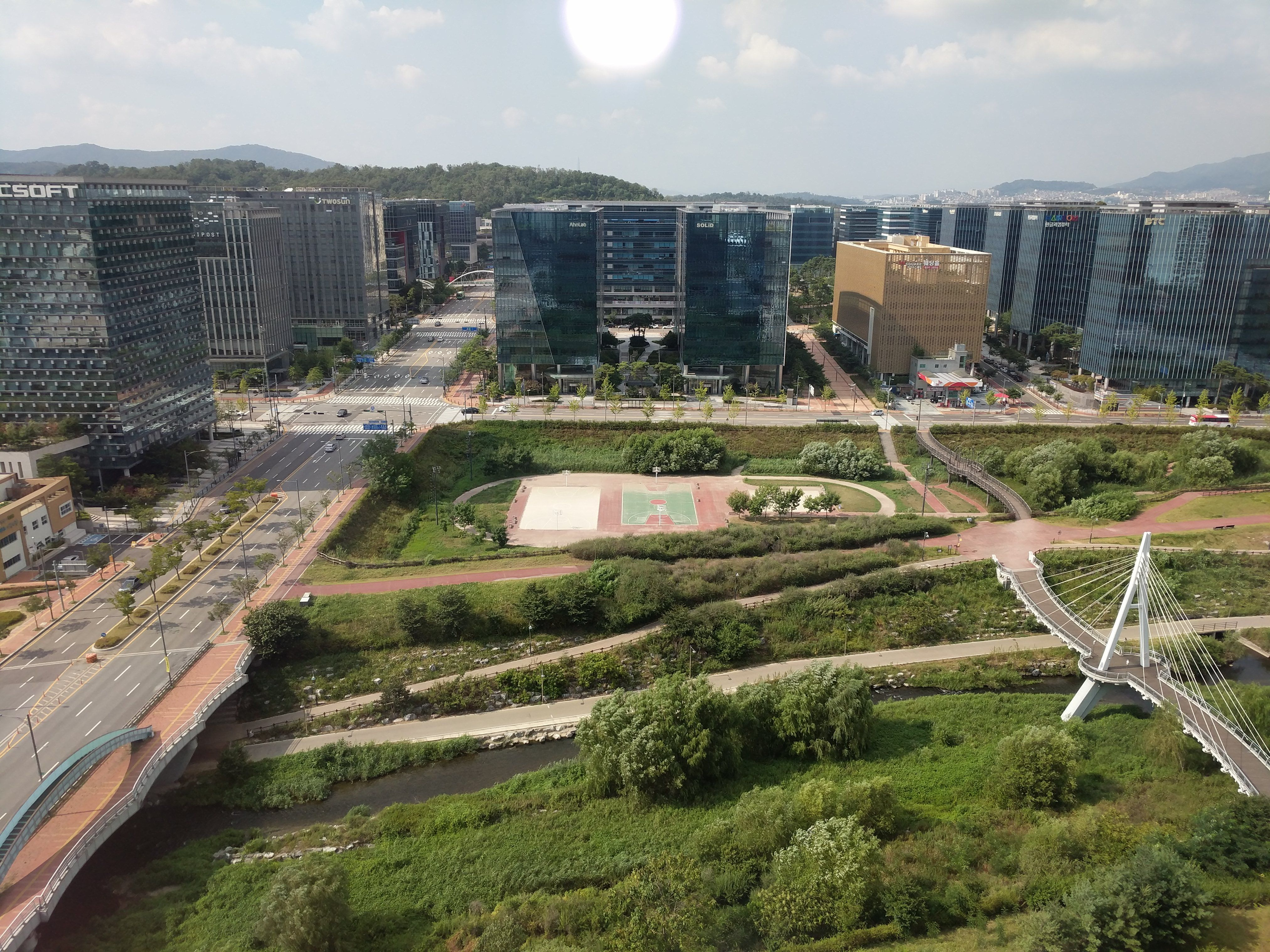
Pangyo Techno Valley

Pangyo Techno Valley (PTV) is an industrial complex in the city of Pangyo, Seongnam, Gyeonggi Province, South Korea. It is also known as the Silicon Valley of Korea. The complex focuses on information technology, biotech, cultural technology and fusion technology. One of the benefits of the diversity of fields and businesses is the maximized growth potential in the field of high-tech technology through exchanges between the companies. The location within a major metropolitan area creates synergy effects because of the proximity to other techno valleys or adjacent knowledge-based infrastructure clusters in the province. The business environment of the PTV is supported by the government of the Gyeonggi Province through the implementation of various support facilities as for examples a R&D center or public support center.

Techno Valleys in Korea are playing an important role in innovation, creating new jobs and as hubs for technology start-ups. They are supported by the government through policy measures as for example tax-cuts, low interest loans or an expansion of the infrastructure.

== Construction ==
Opened in 2011, Pangyo Techno Valley covers an area of about 661,000 m^{2} in total. The general research site covers about 267,000 m^{2}. This site has direct researching facilities, research developing facilities, and school-work linked researching facilities. The research supporting site covers about 118,000 m^{2}. This site has guest houses, dormitories, a specialized graduate school, and a job training center. There has also been established a Global R&D center that covers about 46,488 m^{2} (building) and 12,578 m^{2} (land). It provides e.g. conference and education rooms. The parking lot covers 21,716 m^{2}.

After the success of the Pangyo Techno Valley a second Pangyo Techno Valley is under construction. The second Pangyo Techno Valley covers about 425,760 m^{2} in total. The first phase is expected to be finished in December 2019. The second phase is scheduled to be completed in June 2019. There are also plans for a third Pangyo Techno Valley that should be implemented until 2022 according to the region's governor. It will be built on a 583,581 m^{2} site in Geumto-dong, Seongnam, Gyeonggi.

== Companies ==
- ABN (Arem Broadcasting Network)
- AhnLab Inc, founded in 1995, is a security software provider in South Korea. AhnLab means 'Ahn-laboratory' and was constructed by Ahn Cheol-soo. Today AhnLab sells computer software such as antivirus software, online security software for online games and the Mobile Web.
- CHA group consortium 'CHA group' is a hospital and R&D group for human health sciences. 'CHA' was named after its owner's surname.
- Gabia Inc, Internet domain registrar and hosting provider in South Korea.
- Kakao, a mobile app and Internet website developer
- Nexon, a video game developer and publisher
- Paymentwall, a global payment service and technology provider.
- SK-Chemical was constructed by SK Group in 1976. SKC is now a chemical-research company in Korea. SKC requires 'green chemicals' and 'life sciences' for the health of humanity.
- SK Planet, a mobile solutions subsidiary of SK Telecom
- Smilegate, a video game developer and publisher
- YURA corporation.

== Economy ==
The Pangyo Techno Valley also affects the economic development of Pangyo and Bundang significantly. In 2011, when the Techno Valley was established 88 companies had offices in this area. In 2017 already more than 1300 companies were based in the Pangyo Techno Valley, generating over 77.4 trillion Korean Won in sales. 22 percent of the province's gross domestic product is generated in the Pangyo Techno Valley. Due to the Shinbundang Line and various other transportation links the techno valley is well connected to Seoul and the Pangyo Station's business district will grow in size.

== Transportation ==
Subway: Pangyo Station is the closest subway station to the Pangyo Techno Valley. Visitors and workers exit through Number 1 and travel for two blocks to reach the Pangyo Techno Valley.

Bus: Pangyo Techno Valley has two different bus stops in front of the valley. The closest bus stop is number '320'. The second bus stop, which is numbered '380' and '4000', is across the road in the valley.

== See also ==
- Pangyo Techno Valley vent collapse
