= Seongnam =

City in Gyeonggi, South Korea

Coordinates: 37°26′N 127°9′E

- Specific city
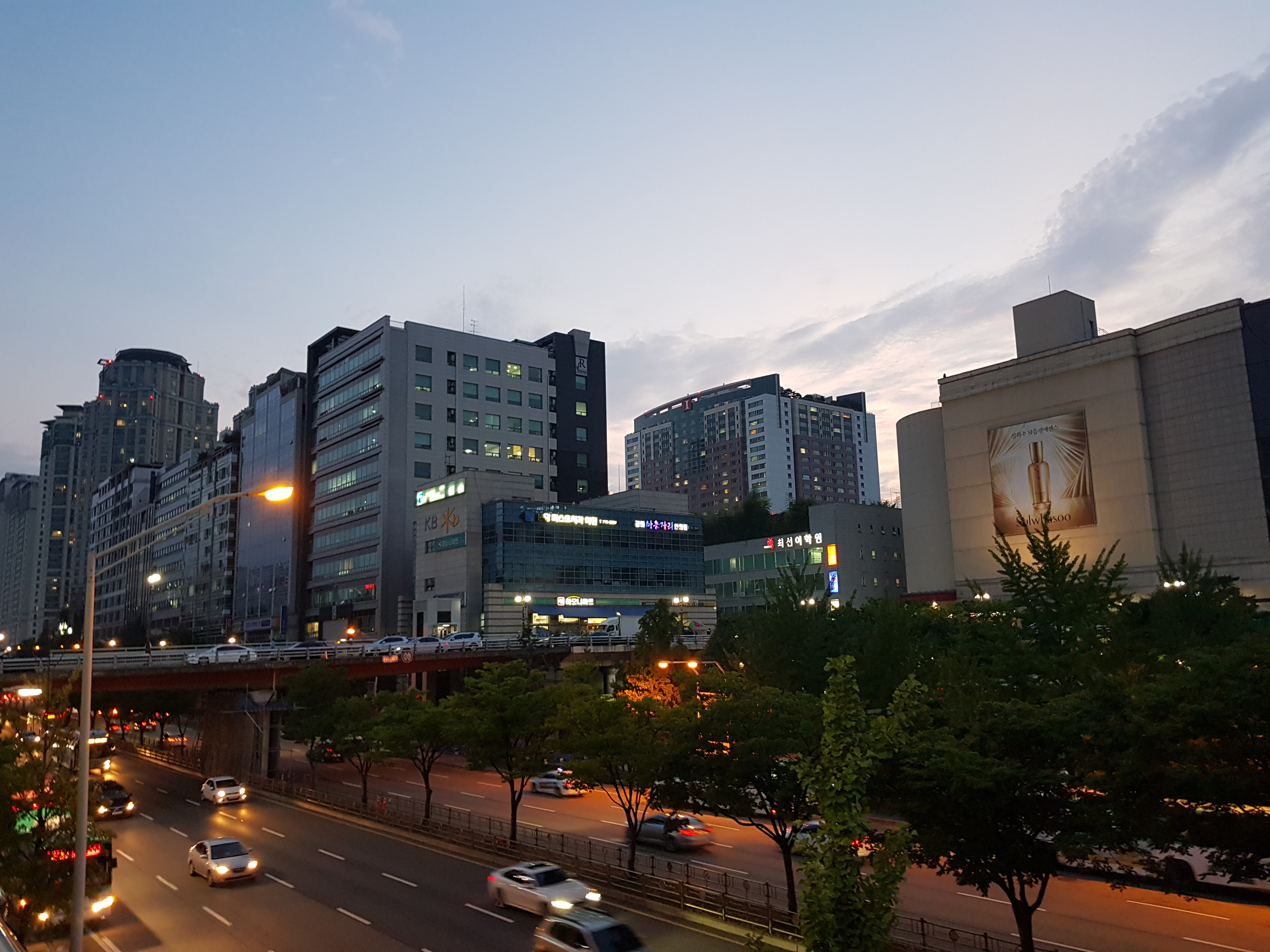
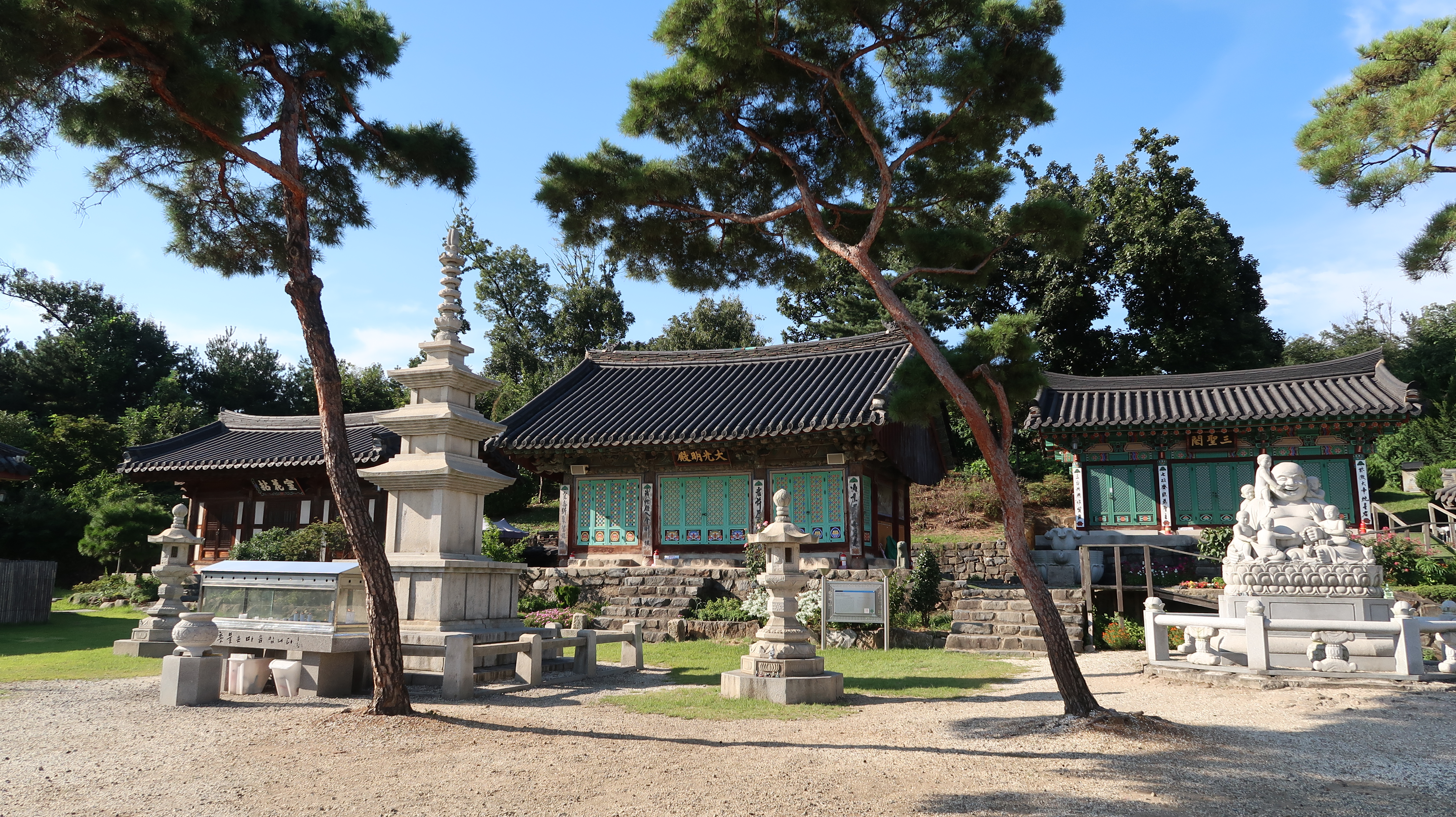
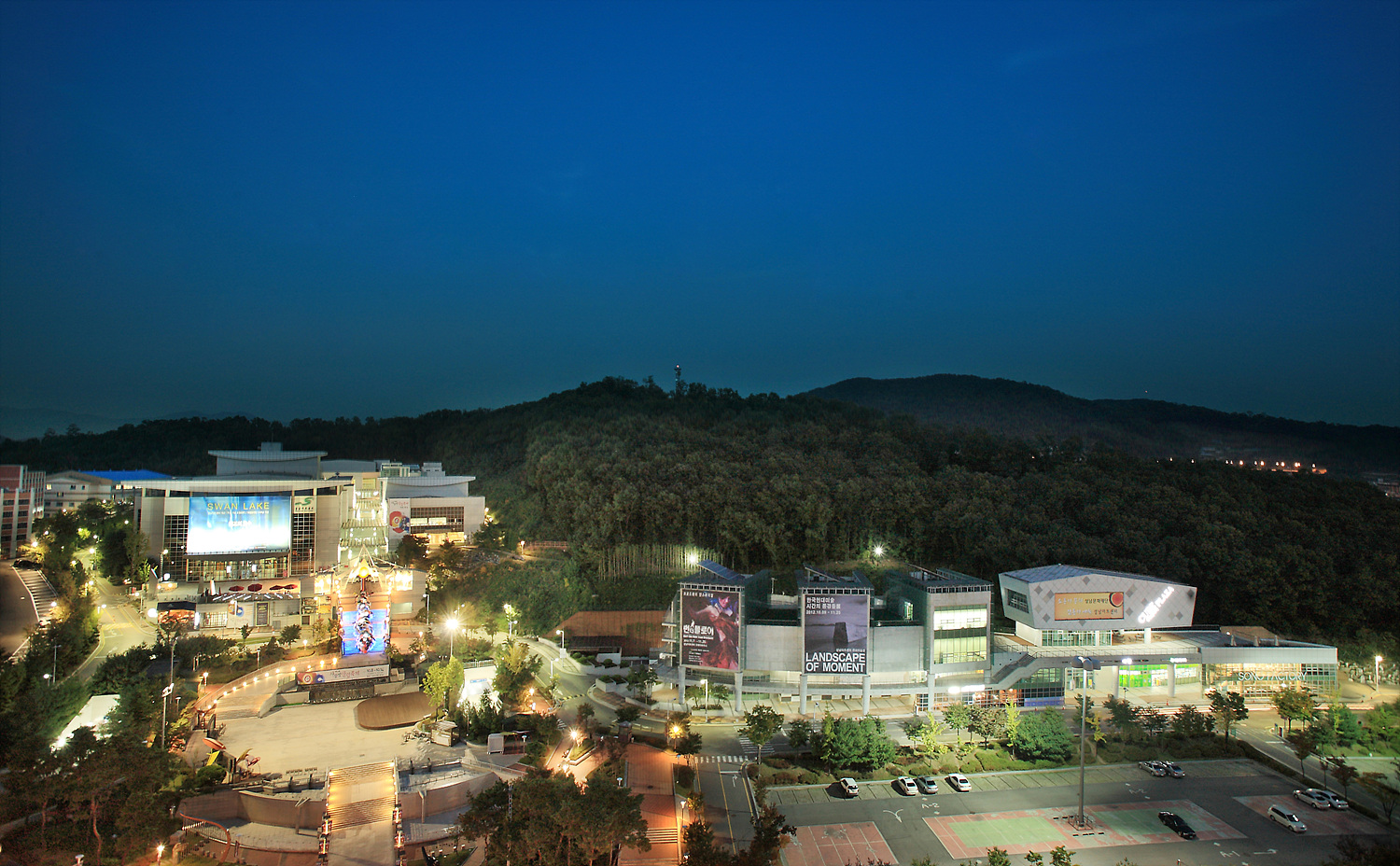
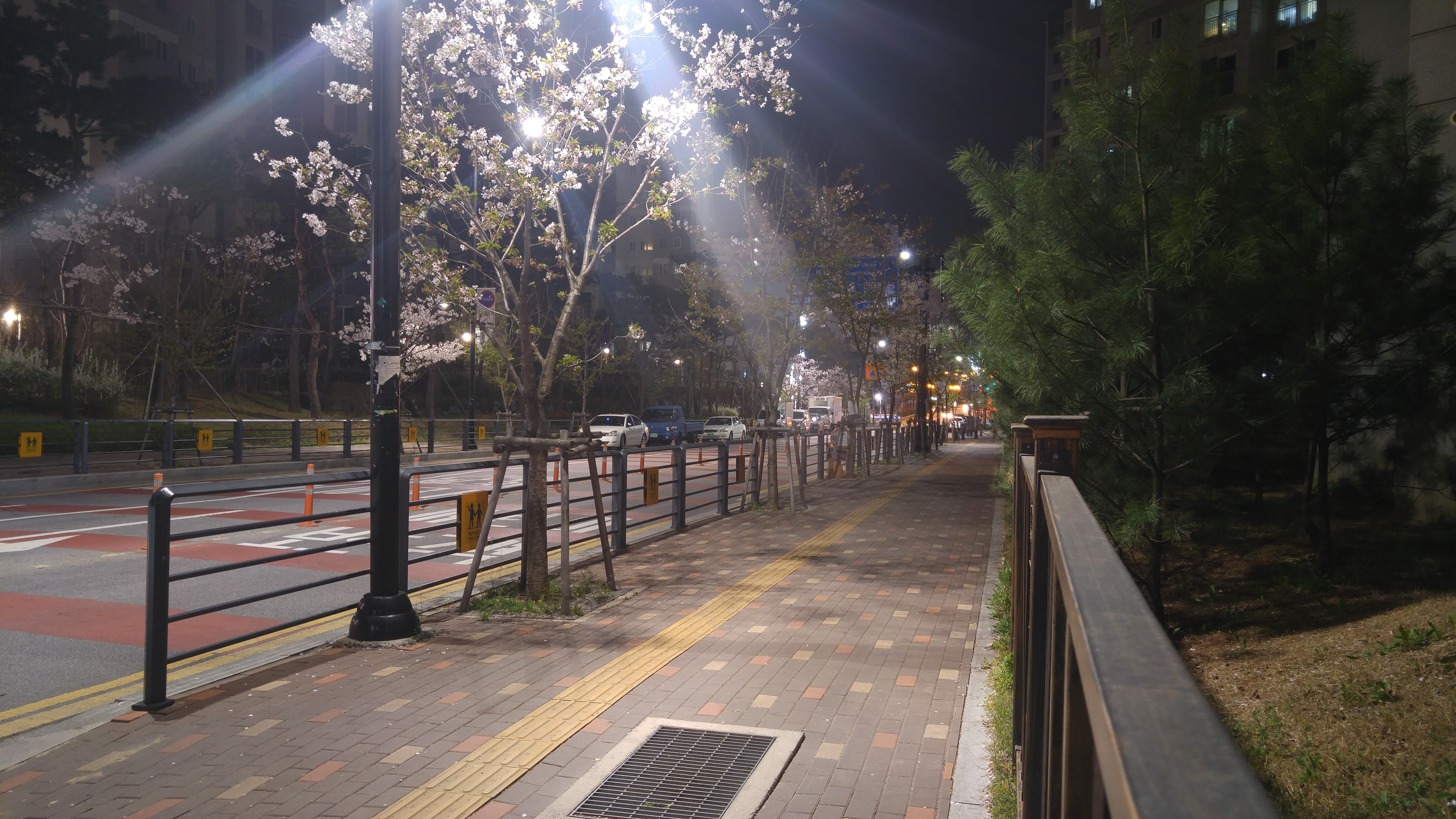
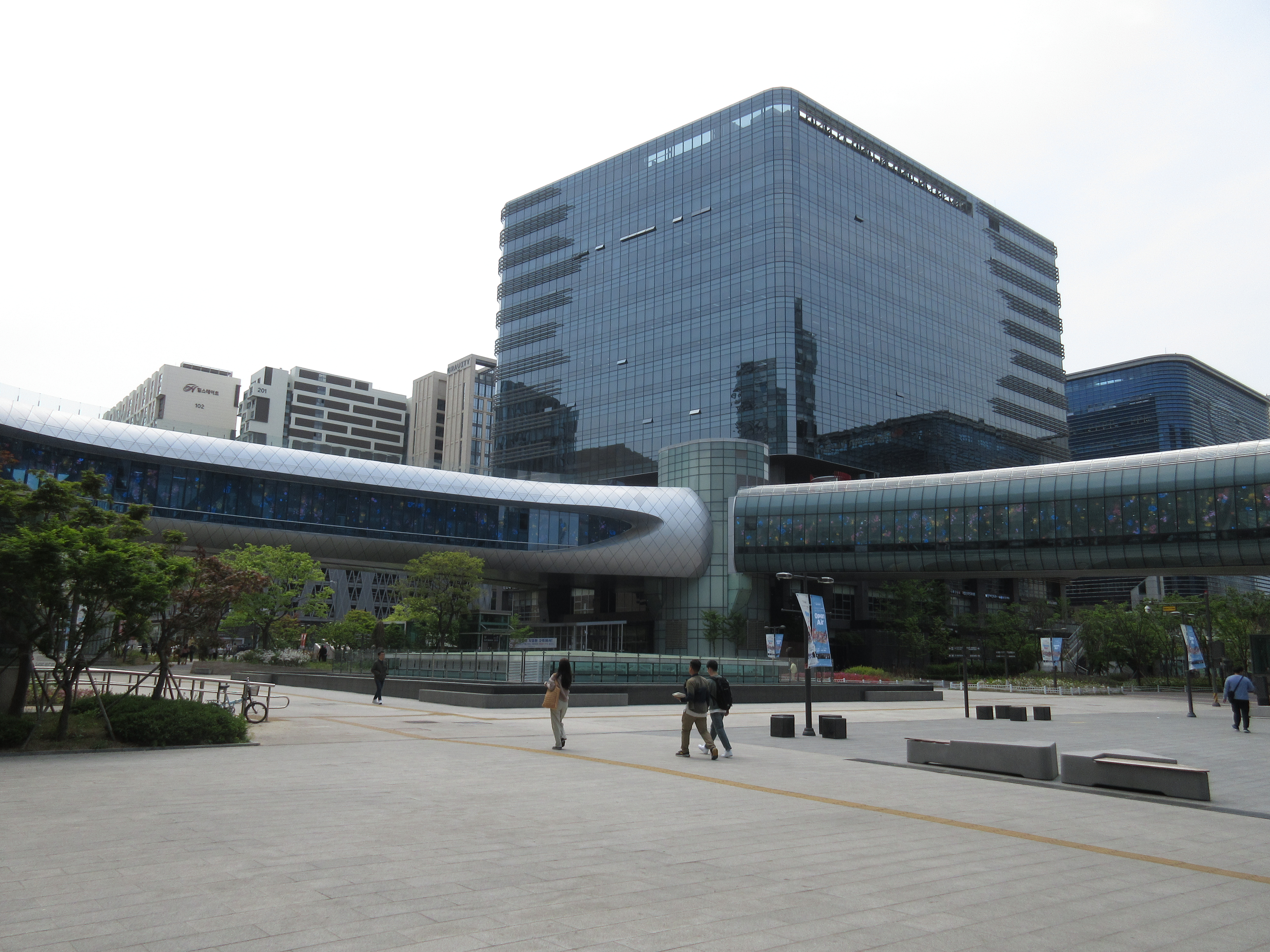
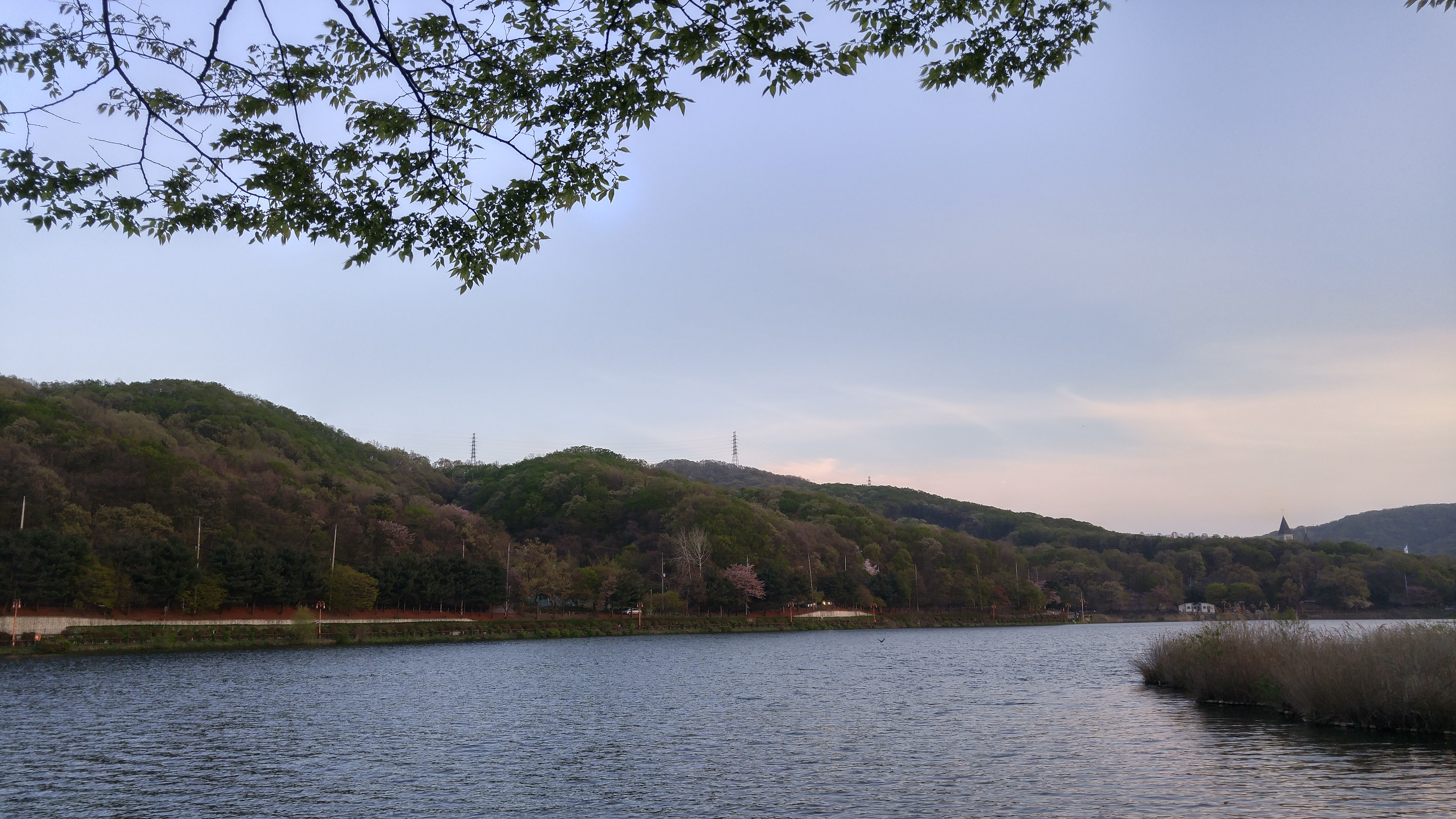
- View from Sunae Overpass at Sunae-dong Bongguksa of the Jogye Order Seongnam Arts Center Yatap-dong Pangyo Station Plaza Yuldong Park

- Flag Emblem of Seongnam

- Location in South Korea
- Country: South Korea
- Region: Gyeonggi Province (Sudogwon)
- Administrative divisions: 3 gu, 44 dong

Government
  - Mayor: Shin Sang-jin (People Power)

Area
  - Total: 141.70 km^{2} (54.71 sq mi)

Population (September 2024)
  - Total: 914,832
  - Density: 7,032.1/km^{2} (18,213/sq mi)
  - Dialect: Seoul

Korean name
- Hangul: 성남시
- Hanja: 城南市
- RR: Seongnam-si
- MR: Sŏngnam-si

Seongnam (Korean: 성남; Korean pronunciation: [sʰʌŋ.nam]) is the fourth largest city in South Korea's Gyeonggi Province after Suwon and the 10th largest city in the country. Its population is approximately one million. It consists of three administrative districts: Bundang District, Jungwon District, and Sujeong District.

Seongnam, one of the foremost planned cities in South Korean history, was conceived during the era of President Park Chung Hee for the purpose of industrializing the nation by concentrating electronic, textile, and petrochemical facilities there during the 1970s and 1980s. The city featured a network of roads, to Seoul and other major cities like Gwangju, Gyeonggi, from the early 1970s on. Today, Seongnam has merged with the metropolitan network of Seoul. Seongnam has also served as a "test bed" of South Korea's urban planning history. Bundang, one of the successful new town projects in the country, has been settled in the southern half of Seongnam since 1991.

The city is also home to K League football club Seongnam FC.

== Administrative districts ==
District	Korean name	Hanja	Area (km^{2})	Household	Population	Dong
Sujeong District	수정구	壽井區	45.46	116,300	232,658	17
Jungwon District	중원구	中院區	26.41	99,939	204,356	11
Bundang District	분당구	盆唐區	69.77	193,315	469,740	22
Seongnam City	성남시	城南市	141.64	408,915	906,754	50

== Statistics ==
Miscellaneous

Government workers:	2,199
Medical centers:	952
Teachers:	7,245
Students per Teacher:	23
Number of Cars:	270,289

Population by year

Year	Total population
1975	272,470
1980	376,822
1985	447,647
1990	540,690
1995	868,268
2000	912,222
2005	931,019
2010	936,267
2015	969,675
2025	906,754

== Economy ==
Numerous major companies have migrated their headquarters from Downtown Seoul to Seongnam to help government's plan to accelerate the dispersion of Seoul's population to its suburbs and relieve the congested Seoul metropolitan area. Seongnam is now home to prominent companies such as KT (formerly Korea Telecom), Naver, and HD Hyundai Heavy Industries.

Pangyo Techno Valley is the premier industrial complex in Seongnam. Nowcom has its headquarters in Pangyo. Because of its significance, Pangyo now serves as a core area of Seongnam, replacing the old downtown in northeast Jungwon and Sujeong.

== Sports ==
Seongnam FC is a professional football club based in the city. The club now competes in the K League 2.

== Education ==
Seongnam is well known for one of the highest educational standard. Dong Seoul University and Gachon University are the major universities in the city. Many high schools provide competitive and rigorous education to local students.

Seongnam is under jurisdiction of Gyeonggi Provincial Office of Education. The municipal office of education reports to Gyeonggi Provincial Superintendent, and is located in Seohyeon-dong, Bundang District.

The city's only international school is Korea International School – Pangyo. Seongnam is home to the Seongnam Foreign Language High School and Gachon University's primary campus.

=== Libraries ===
In Seongnam, there is 1 provincial library, and 19 municipal libraries.

== Tourism and culture ==
The Seongnam Arts Center includes three theaters: the opera house, concert hall, and ensemble theater. It also includes the main arts hall and the cube arts hall, an academy, musical fountains, outdoor recreation facilities, and leisure facilities.

- Namhansanseong
- Pangyo Eco Center
- Pangyo Museum
- Bundang Central Park
- Yuldong Park

== Climate ==
Seongnam has a humid continental climate (Köppen: Dwa), but can be considered a borderline humid subtropical climate (Köppen: Cwa) using the −3 °C (27 °F) isotherm.

Climate data for Seongnam (1995–2020 normals)
Month	Jan	Feb	Mar	Apr	May	Jun	Jul	Aug	Sep	Oct	Nov	Dec	Year
Mean daily maximum °C (°F)	2.6 (36.7)	5.8 (42.4)	12.0 (53.6)	18.9 (66.0)	24.6 (76.3)	28.5 (83.3)	30.0 (86.0)	30.9 (87.6)	26.7 (80.1)	20.5 (68.9)	12.4 (54.3)	4.5 (40.1)	18.1 (64.6)
Daily mean °C (°F)	−1.8 (28.8)	0.9 (33.6)	6.5 (43.7)	12.9 (55.2)	18.6 (65.5)	23.2 (73.8)	25.8 (78.4)	26.5 (79.7)	21.7 (71.1)	14.9 (58.8)	7.5 (45.5)	0.2 (32.4)	13.1 (55.6)
Mean daily minimum °C (°F)	−6.0 (21.2)	−3.4 (25.9)	1.6 (34.9)	7.5 (45.5)	13.1 (55.6)	18.5 (65.3)	22.4 (72.3)	22.9 (73.2)	17.4 (63.3)	10.0 (50.0)	3.2 (37.8)	−3.8 (25.2)	8.6 (47.5)
Average precipitation mm (inches)	14.9 (0.59)	25.3 (1.00)	36.0 (1.42)	64.7 (2.55)	85.3 (3.36)	111.8 (4.40)	375.5 (14.78)	320.2 (12.61)	131.1 (5.16)	45.9 (1.81)	44.5 (1.75)	19.6 (0.77)	1,274.8 (50.19)
Average precipitation days (≥ 0.1 mm)	3.5	3.7	5.7	7.0	7.5	8.0	13.9	13.2	7.4	5.2	7.0	4.9	87
Source: Korea Meteorological Administration

== Transportation ==
Subway/Train

- Great Train eXpress Line A
- Suin–Bundang Line
- Gyeonggang Line
- Seoul Metropolitan Subway Line 8
- Shinbundang Line

Bus

- (Red Bus)
- 90OO, 93OO, 94OO (OO means another number excl. 01) to Gangnam District or Jung District, Seoul
- (Green Bus)- Gyeonggi Bus
- Green bus to Seoul, Gwangju, Yongin, western Gyeonggi Province, National Road
- National Road number 3-Gwangju-Yatap-Sangdaewon-Seongnam IC-Gachon University Station-Seoul

Expressway

- Seoul Ring Expressway (road number 100)
- Gyeongbu Expressway (road number 1)
- Yongin-Seoul Expressway (road number 171)
- Bundang-Suseo City Road (road number 81)
- Bundang-Naegok City Road (road number 81)

== Twin towns – sister cities ==
Seongnam is twinned with:

- Aurora, United States (1992)
- Piracicaba, Brazil (1986)
- Shenyang, China (1998)

== Notable people ==
- Dahyun, member of K-pop girl group Twice
- Jennie, member of K-pop girl group Blackpink
- Kino, member of K-pop boy group Pentagon
- Lee Jae Myung, 14th president of South Korea
- Lee Yeon-hee, South Korean actress and model
- Lee Yo-won, South Korean actress
- Solbin, member of K-pop girl group Laboum
- Jimin, former member of AOA
- Kim Hye-yoon, South Korean actress
- Woodz, South Korean rapper and singer-songwriter

== See also ==
- KAONMEDIA manufacture and sale of digital set top boxes
- List of cities in South Korea
- Geography of South Korea
- Seoul National Capital Area
- Seongnam Central Library
