= Seongnam Foreign Language High School =

Coordinates: 37°22′42″N 127°05′47″E

Seongnam Foreign Language High School 성남외국어고등학교 城南外國語高等學校
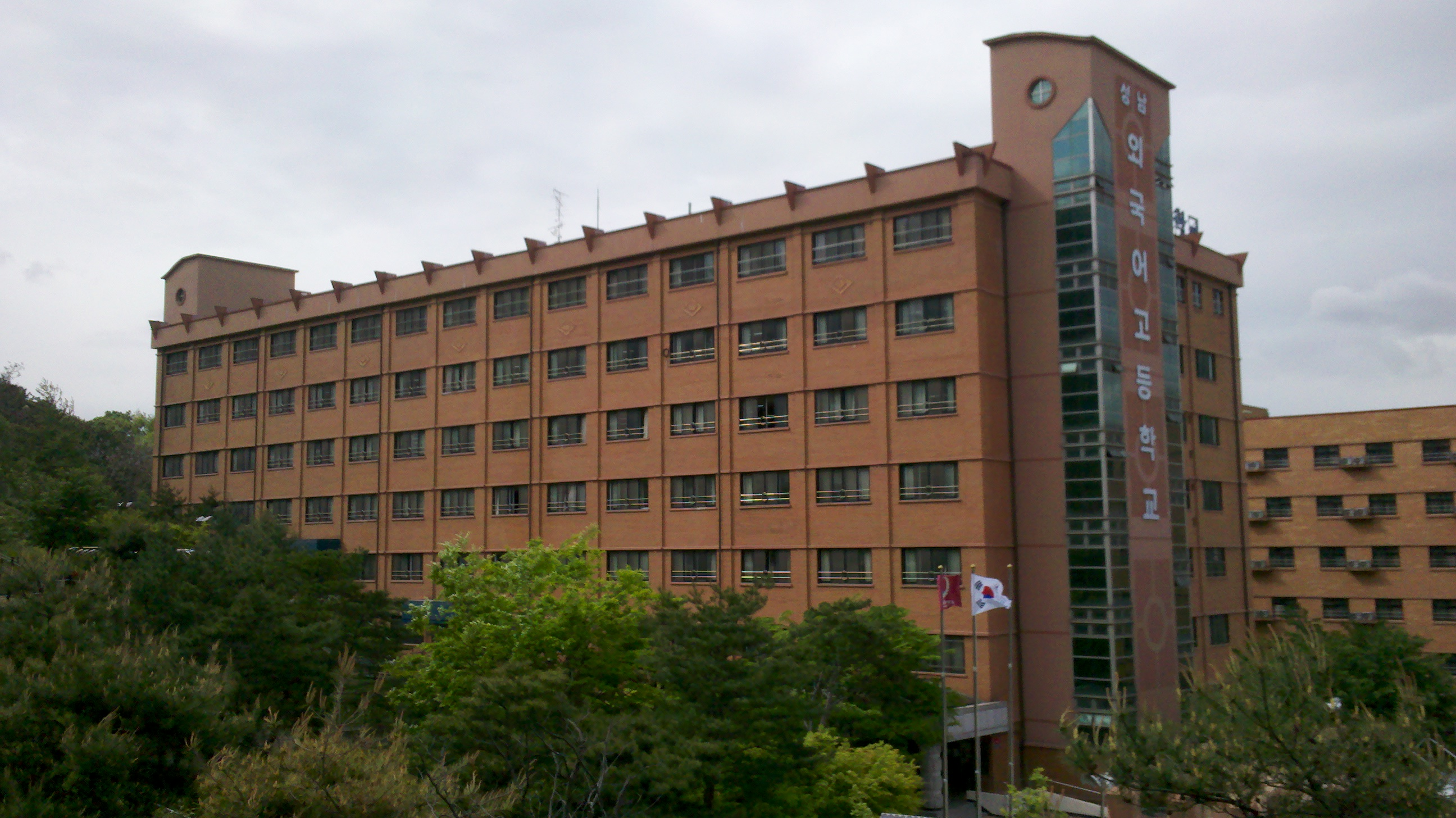
- Seongnam; South Korea

Information
- Type: Public
- Motto: Ambition, Bravery, Challenge
- Established: 2006
- Principal: Cho young-wu
- Faculty: 78
- Grades: 10-12
- Average class size: approx. 30 students
- Campus: City
- Tree: Pine tree
- Flower: Rose
- Website: https://snfl-h.goesn.kr/snfl-h/main.do

Seongnam Foreign Language School (Korean: 성남외국어고등학교, 성남외고 Hanja: 城南外國語高等學校), commonly referred to as SNFL is a national school located in Seongnam, South Korea. SNFL offers regular high school courses with four different second language programs (English, German, Chinese, Japanese).

== Academics - Foreign Language Program ==
=== Japanese ===
- Focus on systematic language learning through practical speaking exercises rather than grammar-oriented classes.
- Build effective communication competence through the understanding of Japanese culture and Japanese immersion classes.
- Provide individual instruction with learning activities based on each student’s level.

=== Chinese ===
- Provide professional intensive guidance through team teaching (Chinese language teacher with native Chinese speaking teacher) and small group classes.
- Operate new HSK preparation class through after-school activities as well as regular classes.
- Host various programs such as a Chinese cultural festival, Chinese speech contest, publication of a Chinese newspaper, Chinese club activities, etc.

=== German ===
- Acquire essential grammar elements that make up the basic German sentence structures.
- Learn four language skills together with a focus on listening and speaking ability.
- Systematically prepare for the SD and ZD test through educational activities such as regular classes with a native German teacher and after-school activities.

=== English ===
- Operate conversation and writing classes tending to the students’ individual needs based on their level.
- Acquire four language skills together through native English-speaking teachers who have diverse major backgrounds.
- Improve students’ fluency by providing authentic learning environments.

Criteria for personality aspect
Section	Criteria
School life	Observation and respect of school rules (less than 1 black mark)
Volunteer activity	More than 50 hours of volunteer work(outside of the school) and writing an essay about his or her own experience(at least one time)
Arts & athletics	Participation in any artistic performance competition and winning a prize. Or submission of a paper signed by a foreign language teacher affirming that the student participated in a competition at least two times

Criteria for creativity aspect
Section	Criteria
Majoring or sub majoring foreign language ability (valid for two years)	•English: TOEFL CBT(270 above), IBT(108 above), TOEIC(950 above), TEPS(900 above), Essay publication for the major English newspaper •Japanese: JLPT(Class 1) or JPT(850 above) / •Chinese: New HSK(Class 6) •German: ZD(Class 2 or 240 above)

Criteria for learning abilities
Section	Criteria
Academic reports	Grades of all the subjects at the end of the 1st and 2nd semester should be at least class 5 and more than five subjects should be class 1.

=== ABC Project(Humanities Research Paper Competition) ===
This program’s goal is to develop self-directed learning skills by allowing students to choose a single or an integrated subject and conduct a research project. This program offers students the opportunity to publish their research papers in domestic and international journals.

=== FLIP(Foreign Language Intensive Program) ===
This is an intensive lecture program that helps students to acquire official certification related to their major.

=== Sports club ===
The sports clubs (soccer, basketball, badminton, ping pong, floor-ball, yoga, etc.) aim to improve the basic physical strength of the students and to foster a sound school atmosphere.

=== Lifelong Education Center ===
Lifelong Education Center provides an opportunity for parents and local residents to continue learning. Programs provided include artistic development academy class, flower arrangement class, and parents’ choir.

== School life ==
The school year starts in March, its second semester begins in September and ends in February. Notably, it has the lowest educational expenses among foreign language high schools.

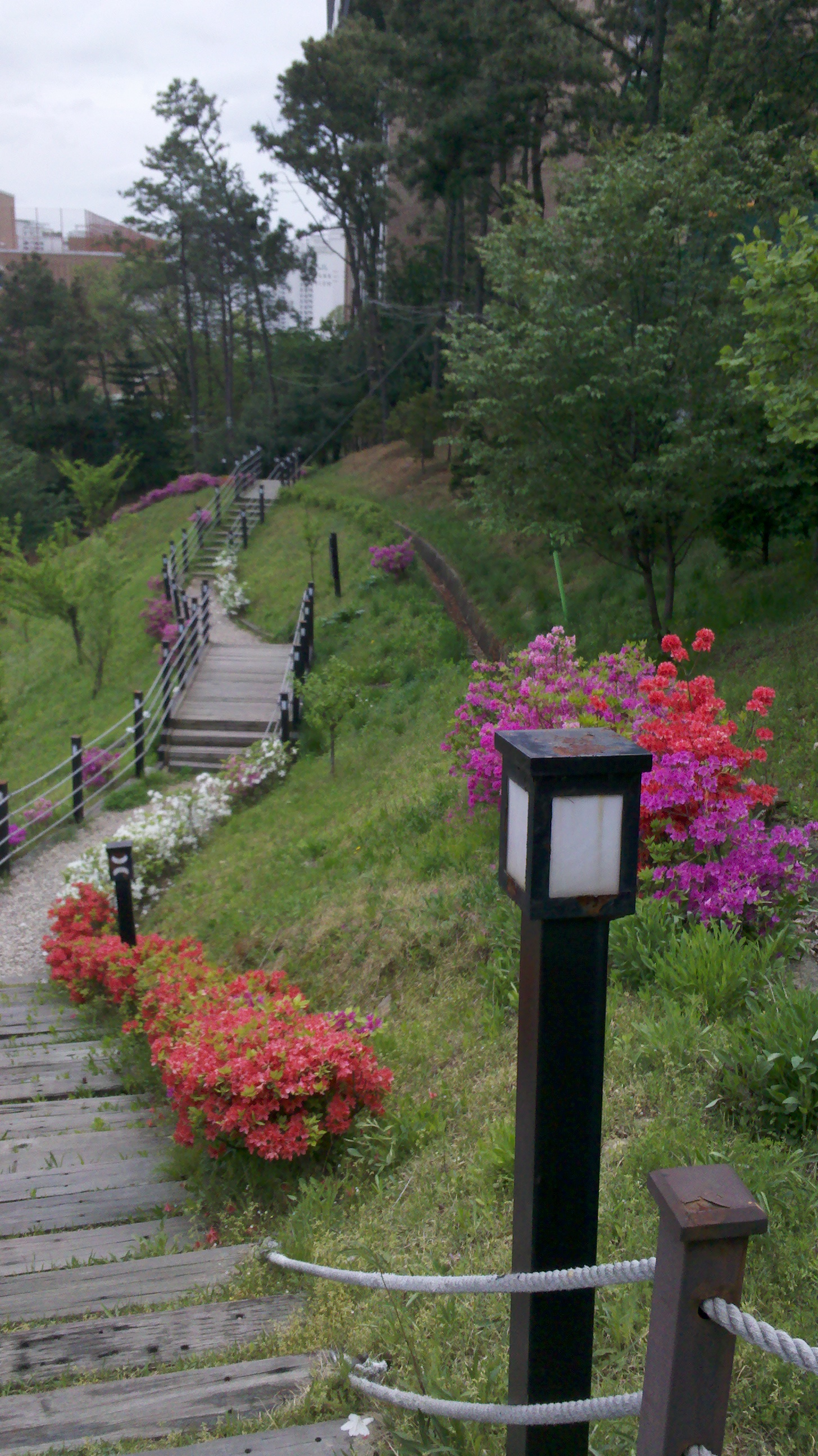
The school's park

=== School Dormitory ===
SNFL operates a school dormitory with various facilities (basketball court, tennis court, ping pong room, dance room, band room, and fitness room). Rooms that can accommodate all current students (generally 4 people per room). Students can use language labs, international conference room, audio/visual room, video class system and also wireless Internet for their study or self-development.

=== The School's Park ===
The school has its own little park next to it for students and teachers to relax during the breaks. It contains a long path for walks, a wooden stage with an outdoor auditorium, a pavilion, benches and some fitness devices. The pathway leads up a hill, and there are flowers planted around it.

=== Others ===
- Classes:

For the 1st year students, foreign language classes are divided into two small classes according to students’ level and are taught separately by a native foreign language speaking teacher and Korean teacher. The math classes operate in a 2-2 class system so all students can feel a sense of accomplishment.
