= Korea International School, Jeju Campus =

College-prep, international school in South Korea

- KISJ

Location
- 8 Global Edu-ro 260beon-gil, Daejeong-eup; Seogwipo-si, Jeju Special Self-Governing Province; South Korea; 33°17′22″N 126°17′1″E

Information
- Type: College-prep, International; Day and Boarding
- Motto: Responsible Leaders for Positive Change
- Established: 19th September 2011
- Founder: YBM
- Category: International School
- CEEB code: 682003
- Chairperson: Sunshik Min, PhD
- Head of school: Patrick Carroll
- Faculty: 153
- Grades: JK–12
- Gender: Coeducational
- Enrollment: 860
- Average class size: 15–19
- Student to teacher ratio: 7:1
- Colors: Blue and gold
- Mascot: Dragon
- Accreditation: WASC
- Website: www.kis.ac

Korea International School, Jeju Campus (KISJ) is South Korea's first international boarding school. The school is a sister campus to Korea International School and an affiliate of YBM, a publishing and English-language education services company. Founded in 2010 and first opened in 2011 as part of the Jeju Global Education City, the school's first senior class of 52 students matriculated in May 2016. KISJ is a proprietary, nonsectarian school offering an internationalized American college preparatory curriculum from Junior Kindergarten through Grade 12, with a boarding program starting in Grade 6. The high school began its AP Capstone™ in 2017–18, one of seven schools to offer it in South Korea.

Korea International School, Jeju Campus is one of few international schools in South Korea where students can enroll without holding a foreign passport or having studied abroad for more than 3 years. The school received a six-year full accreditation from the Western Association of Schools and Colleges (WASC) in August 2015, and is also accredited by the South Korean Ministry of Education; Korean nationals graduate with both a U.S. and South Korean high school diploma.

10 Magazine ranked Korea International School's three campuses collectively as the second best international school in Korea in August 2017.

Korea International School, Jeju Campus is a member of the Korea Council of Overseas Schools (KORCOS) and the East Asia Regional Council of Schools (EARCOS). Additionally, the school maintains associations with a number of international organizations (Thinking Collaborative™, St. Mark's School, the Massachusetts Institute of Technology, World Youth Adventures); participates in national KISAC, KIAC, KIMEA and JAC athletic conferences, as well as international Model United Nations and robotics conferences; collaborates with other international schools in providing professional learning opportunities in addition to hosting weekend workshops for its faculty and outside educators. In winter 2023, KISJ collaborated with two neighbor international schools to host its first GEC Just Learning Conference since before the COVID pandemic.

== Academics ==
The curriculum is standards-based using AP and American Education Reaches Out (AERO) standards, and planned using Understanding by Design.

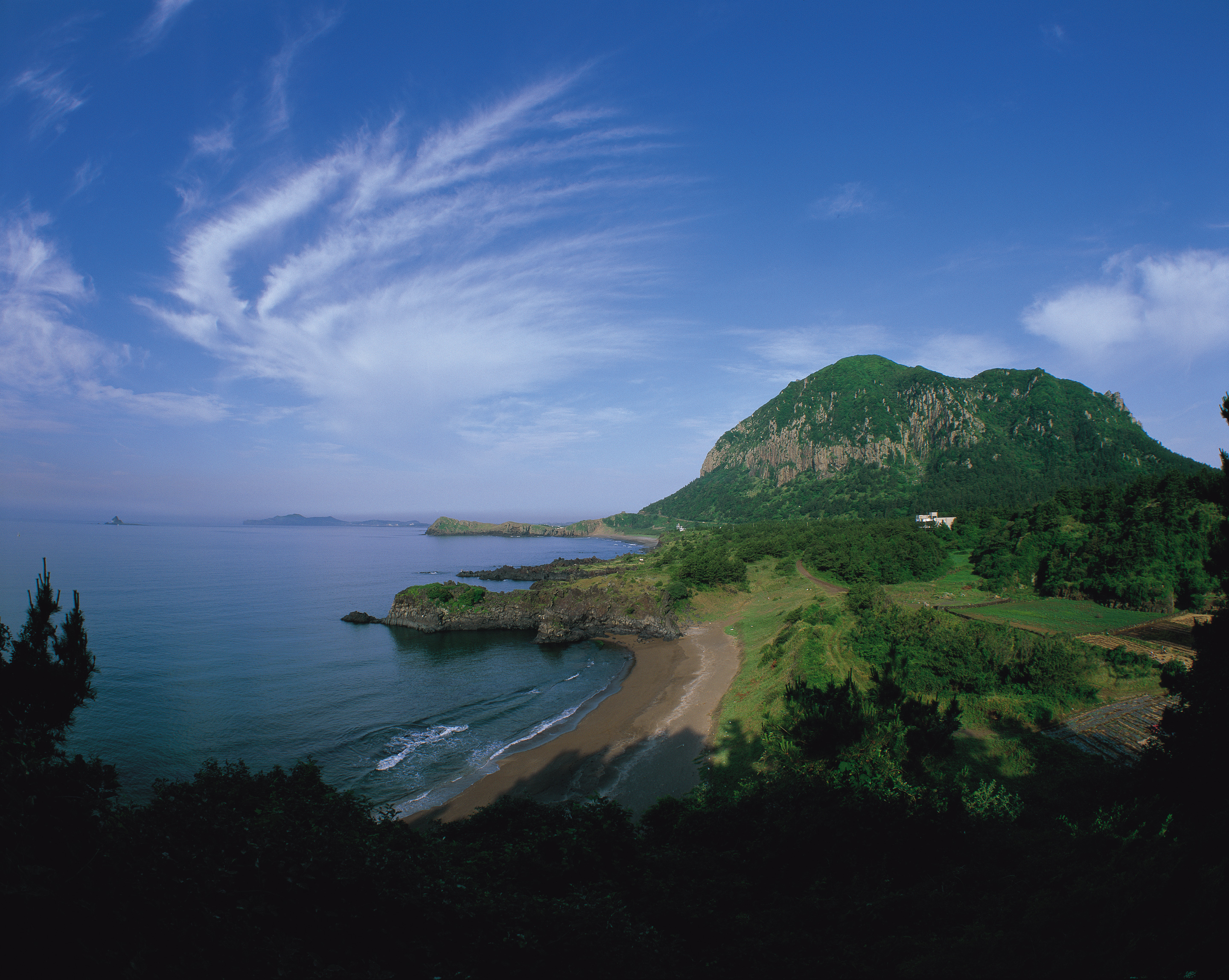
Jeju Island – Location of KISJ

Block class scheduling is used in the high schools with 80 minute blocks, in the middle school with 45 minute periods and in the elementary school with 50 minute periods.

All of the KISJ's overseas faculty are certified teachers, with 67% holding advanced degrees. The school offers a 1:1 MacBook learning environment from Grades 5–12, with Grades JK–4 supported by iPads and an iMac lab; key platforms include Google Classroom, PowerSchool, and Seesaw.

=== Elementary school ===
The elementary school promotes experiential learning. As a Writing and Reading Workshop school, students learn by doing. Methods for writing and reading instruction were developed from the early work of Donald Graves, Donald Murray, and other teacher-researchers who found that coaching students to write and read for a variety of purposes is the most effective way to teach skills and concepts. The elementary school uses a standards-based approach to education, where progress in students' learning is communicated through levels (1-4) and on report cards.

=== Middle school ===
Like the elementary school, the middle school uses the Readers and Writers Workshop approach to teach essential reading and writing skills. The middle school also uses a standards-based approach to assessment and reporting.

=== High school ===
==== Honors and AP ====
KISJ High School students take a typical college-preparatory class load with a modified-block schedule of 4 classes per day, and can challenge themselves through Honors and Advanced Placement® courses, as well as visual and performing arts. Curricular offerings include Honors classes in Grades 9 and 10 with AP courses offered beginning in Grade 10.

Students can be considered for the following Honors courses: Algebra, Geometry, Band, Choir, English 9, English 10, Journalism, Orchestra, Theatre, and Yearbook. Entrance into Honors courses requires a teacher recommendation and considers historical subject grades, standardized test scores (e.g. MAP, AMC, STAR Reading), and additional documentation as needed.

AP classes allow students to engage in a demanding curriculum equivalent to an entry-level college/university course. Currently there are 18 AP® courses offered, including English Language and Composition, English Literature and Composition, United States History, World History, Psychology, Chinese Language and Culture, Studio Art: 2-D Design, Biology, Chemistry, Environmental Science, Calculus AB and BC, Macroeconomics, Physics 1 and 2, Statistics, Seminar, and Research. Students can take a maximum of 6 AP classes if they have below a 3.8 GPA or 8 AP classes if they have above a 3.8 GPA.

Advanced Placement courses are offered starting in Grade 10. 2017 marks the charter year for the AP Capstone™ program, with the introduction of AP Seminar for select members of the Grade-11 class. The second Capstone course, AP Research, was added in 2018. AP Capstone is a College Board program designed to equip students with the independent research, collaborative teamwork, and communication skills that are increasingly valued by colleges. It cultivates curious, independent, and collaborative scholars and prepares them to make logical, evidence-based decisions. Students who pass exams for both of these Capstone courses in addition to four other AP courses will achieve the AP Capstone Diploma™.

Participation in AP coursework is a selective process, wherein students who have a minimum weighted GPA of 3.33 need to complete an application to individual AP courses. To ensure academic readiness and success, additional requirements may be made by individual AP teachers, which include teacher recommendations, advanced reading competency, and completion of required AP summer assignments.

==== Reporting ====
KISJ uses letter grades to summarize the assessment of student benchmark performance. A 4-point grade point scale is used to share the overall academic achievement of each student with colleges and universities. All credit classes are included in the grade point average (GPA). Classes that are designated as Honors (H) or Advanced Placement (AP) receive an additional weighting of (.500) points. The academic year is divided into two semesters, with report cards being issued at the end of each semester (Semester 1 and Semester 2).

==== Graduation Requirements ====
To graduate, high school students need 5.5 English credits, 3 mathematics credits (4 recommended), 3 science credits (4 recommended), 3 social studies credits (4 recommended), 2 world language credits, 2 physical education credits, 1 multimedia/technology credit, .5 speech/debate credits, and 1 visual/performing arts credit. 5 additional elective credits must also be earned beyond these. Korean passport holders are also required to take 1.5 credits of Korean language and history. In total, a minimum of 25.5 credits is required.

Additionally, all students are required to complete a cumulative total of 40 hours of service as a requirement for graduation. Students are responsible for keeping track of their service hours and submitting the required documentation. Most students earn their service hours through club activities, service Learning trips, tutoring other students, and dorm volunteering opportunities.

== Co-curricular Activities ==
=== Athletics ===
Sports are divided into three seasons:

| | Season 1 (August – November) | Season 2 (November – February) | Season 3 (February – May) |
|---|---|---|---|
| High School | Cross country Swimming Tennis Volleyball Golf | Basketball Cheerleading Swimming | Badminton Soccer Track and field Golf |
| Middle School | Badminton Cross country Soccer Swimming Golf | Volleyball Swimming | Basketball Track and field |
| Elementary School | Soccer | Basketball | Swimming Track and field |

KISJ is a member of the following conferences: Korea International School Activities Conference (KISAC), Korean American Interscholastic Activities Conference (KAIAC), Jeju Activities Conference (JAC). In the 2017 school year, KISJ hosted its first ever international Volleyball Invitational tournament. In 2018–19, the Boys Soccer team traveled to the American School in Japan to play in the Kanto Plain Classics as a guest team from South Korea, while the Girls Soccer team also traveled to the American School in Japan to play in the spring. The swim team annually travels to Taiwan for swim competitions, and the Boys and Girls Volleyball team, Boys and Girls Basketball team, and Boys and Girls Soccer team are part of the six-school, AISA (Association of International Schools in Asia) competition.

=== TEDx ===
KISJ hosts a TEDx (independently organized TED talk event) each year. The first event held in January 2017 featured five local adult speakers and one student speaker. This was the first TEDx event on the island and one of only a few in Korea that are student driven. The organizing committee of the event is voluntarily composed of students and teachers.

=== Arts ===
KISJ offers both elective courses and co-curricular programs in visual arts, drama, and music.

At the high school level, students can take Visual Art I and Visual Art II, preparing them well to take the AP Studio Art class if they qualify. Additional visual arts courses include Graphic Design and Yearbook (which focuses on photography and layout design). Students can join the Art for Heart's Sake club or the Canvas club if they want to pursue visual arts outside of class. Students display their artwork yearly at the Tri-School Art Opening in collaboration with the other schools in the Global Education City, and they also display their work at Winter Arts Day – a yearly art showcase that involves elementary, middle, and high school students.

In the high school theatre department, students can take Theatre I and Theatre II courses, which opens the opportunity to take Honors Theatre. KISJ High School Theatre puts on 2 productions each year (a fall play and spring musical). Typically there are 30–40 student cast members per year with an additional 30–40 students crew members working behind the scenes on ticketing, marketing, costume, set, sound, and lighting design. Previous productions include: High School Music-pocalpyse, A Midsummer Night's Dream, Almost, Maine, The Complete Works of William Shakespeare (Abridged), Our Town, The 25th Annual Putnam County Spelling Bee, 7 Stories, and Urinetown: The Musical! KISJ Theatre also attends the ISTA (International Schools Theatre Association) conference once per year, and runs a student-produced film-festival and play-writing festival.

In grade five, students have the choice of taking band, orchestra or choir and can participate in one selection each semester. By the time students reach high school, they can take Band and Honors Band, Choir and Honors Choir, or Orchestra and Honors Orchestra elective courses. In middle and elementary school, musical ensembles perform at Winter Arts Day, but at the high school, Band/Orchestra perform in two concerts held in the KISJ Performing Arts Center (PAC) yearly, and Choir performs in two concerts yearly (in addition to performance at music festivals). There are many music-related clubs in the high school including the Tri-M Music Honor Society, a jazz band called "Gold Pasta," and an Orchestra club.

=== Clubs and Other Activities ===
Elementary School students choose from different activities on a quarterly basis, for example: robotics, coding, and sports.

Middle School students participate in Exploratory Courses, for example: golf, chess, mechanics, and strings.

High School students participate in over 30 clubs, for example: National Honor Society, Mu Alpha Theta, Key Club, Global Issues Network, and Model United Nations (MUN). The MUN club founded the only MUN conference in the Global Education City, called GECMUN. GECMUN was the first MUN conference in South Korea to offer "crisis committees" and grown from a small conference with 50 students in 2015 to a conference with 300+ students hosting schools from around Asia.

== Facilities ==
Korea International School, Jeju Campus is located in a rural but rapidly-developing area, with public transport service from the 755 bus.

The school campus comprises two main areas connected by a bridge: the elementary and middle school (completed in September 2011), and the high school (completed in August 2014). In total, there are 12 buildings with 110 classrooms. The Elementary and Middle School Campus includes separate academic buildings, each with its own library, music practice rooms, auditoriums; shared facilities include a mid-sized turf athletic field, tennis and basketball courts, 25m swimming pool, and three dormitories. The high school campus includes an academic building; sports facilities including a 25m swimming pool, gymnasium, turf soccer field, outdoor tennis and basketball courts, and golf practice room; and four connected dormitories. The school maintains an additional soccer field and 400m track across from the elementary and middle school. School libraries hold approximately 50,000 volumes.

== Students ==
96% of students are South Korean nationals, 3% are dual citizens (Korean and another country), 3% are Chinese nationals, and 1% hold American, Canadian, Australian, or UK citizenship.

Admission is selective (the average acceptance rate for 2016–17 was 35%), and applicants are evaluated based on past academic achievements, English-language proficiency, character skills, and grade-level capacity.

== Faculty ==
There are about 150 full-time academic staff at KISJ for a staff-to-student ratio of 1:7. 67% of these international hires hold advanced degrees (master's or above). Over 90% of the current international academic staff have 3+ years teaching experience (66% in 2015–16). 68% of teachers are from the United States, 14% are from Canada, 9% are from South Korea, with the rest from Australia, China, and the EU. Teachers are required to sign a minimum of a three-year contract upon being hired to work at the school.

== Boarding ==
Korea International School, Jeju Campus offers full-time boarding for students in Grades 6–12. Boarders are cared for by 40 full-time overseas and Korean boarding staff, with academic faculty offering pastoral support for their advisory.

KISJ dorm students are placed in houses according to their grade level and gender, and are provided with developmentally appropriate supervision and support by staff with experience in both academic and extracurricular programming. Dorm staff promote an English-language environment and collaborate closely with teaching faculty to provide academic guidance during evening study halls.

Middle School houses are managed by house teams with 3 staff members, allowing a 1:8 staff-to-student ratio. High School house sizes range from 12 to 24 students, for a maximum staff-to-student ratio of 1:12. House teams include a Korean staff member to facilitate parent communication and manage culturally sensitive issues, and divisional dorm offices provide effective administrative support during the daytime and evenings.

In addition to having access to school facilities on evenings and weekends, KIS Jeju dorm students have access to lounges, kitchens, and laundry rooms, as well as dorm nurses and counselors who offer professional medical and social-emotional care.

A dorm clubs program features a range of activities aligned with student interests and staff areas of expertise. Current and past offerings include debate, service leading activities, horseback riding, golf, scuba diving, music lessons, hiking, team sports, culinary arts, yoga, ultimate frisbee, and subject-specific tutoring. Dorm staff also plan weekly house activities to help students relax and connect, in addition to leading regular life skills and team-building sessions.
