= Korea International School (South Korea) =

International school in South Korea

- 한국외국인학교
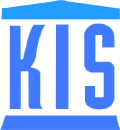
- Seongnam; Jeju City; Seoul; South Korea

Information
- Type: International School
- Established: 2000; 26 years ago
- Grades: K–12 (Seongnam campus); K–12 (Jeju campus); K–5 (Seoul campus)
- Language: English
- Website: www.kis.or.kr (Seongnam campus); kis.ac (Jeju campus); kisseoul.or.kr (Seoul campus)

Korea International School (KIS; Korean: 한국외국인학교) is an international school in South Korea, with campuses in Seoul, Seongnam, and Jeju Province.

The school was established in 2000. Its Jeju Province campus was founded in 2011.

== Description ==
The Gaepo-dong, Seoul campus was the first to be founded. It was founded in 2000. It teaches kindergarten through fifth grade. The other two campuses provide kindergarten through twelfth grade education. By 2018, the Pangyo, Seongnam campus had over 1,150 students. It offered 24 Advanced Placement courses. Most of the teachers were reportedly hired abroad; according to the school, in 2018, 68% of the teachers at the Pangyo campus had a master's degree or higher and an average teaching career of 10.7 years.
