= Suin Line =

Commuter subway line of Korail

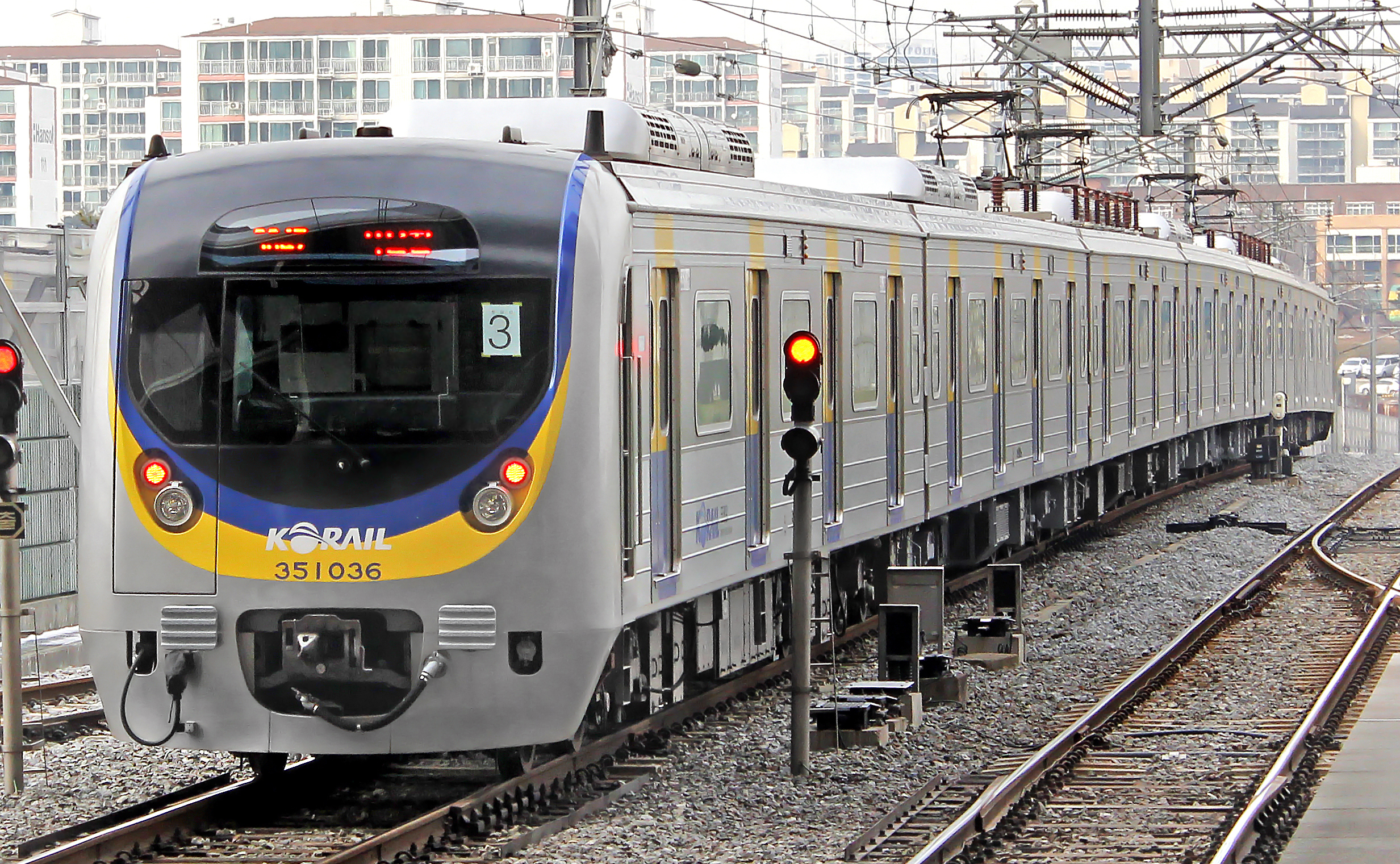

Overview
- Native name: 수인선(水仁線); Suinseon
- Status: Operational
- Termini: Suwon; Incheon
- Stations: 27 operational (8 shared with the Ansan Line)

Service
- Type: Rapid transit
- System: Seoul Metropolitan Subway
- Operator: Korail
- Depot: Siheung

History
- Opened: June 30, 2012 (Phase 1); February 27, 2016 (Phase 2); September 12, 2020 (Phase 3) (new route)
- Closed: December 31, 1995 (original route)

Technical
- Line length: 39.2 km (24.4 mi)
- Num of tracks: 2
- Track gauge: 762 mm (2 ft 6 in)

The Suin Line (Suwon–Incheon; Korean: 수인선) was a metro line of the Seoul Metropolitan Subway serving the Seoul Capital Area.

The original route, abandoned in 1995, was one of the few 762 mm (2 ft 6 in) narrow-gauge railways in South Korea. Opened by the privately owned Chosen Gyeongdong Railway in 1937, it connected Suwon to Namincheon via Ansan and Siheung; in 1942, it was taken over by another private railway, the Chosen Railway (the largest of colonial Korea's privately owned railway companies). The Chosen Railway owned the line until all railways in Korea were nationalized after 1945. However, since December 28, 2004, the Suin Line is being reconstructed with standard gauge and double tracking as an integral part of the Seoul Metropolitan Subway network and is opening in three phases.

All northbound trains terminated at Incheon, all southbound services terminated at Oido. Express train service served only Oido, Soraepogu, Incheon Nonhyeon, Woninjae, Yeonsu, Inha University, and Incheon.

Trains along the line were 6 cars long. Platforms at stations are built for 8 cars in preparation for the merging of the Bundang Line with the Suin Line, and are prepared for 10 cars when the extension occurs.

Trains run at an interval of 15 minutes throughout the day.

== History ==
2012:

June 30: The rebuilt Suin Line is officially opened from Oido to Songdo.

2014:

December 27: Darwol Station opens as an in-fill station.

2016:

February 27: The line is extended westward from Songdo to Incheon.

2017:

July 10: Express service is launched on the line.

2020:

September 12: The line is extended eastward from Oido to Suwon. The Suin Line and Bundang Line are integrated into Suin–Bundang Line, which connects Incheon and Wangsimni. Trains run from Cheongnyangni station or Wangsimni station to Jukjeon station, Gosaek station, or Incheon station.

=== Planned for the future ===
Hagik station is planned to open between Songdo and Inha University in 2020. In addition, a connection line is under consideration at Suwon that will allow KTX trains to run between the Gyeongbu high-speed railway and Incheon Station via the Suin-Bundang Line by 2025.

== Stations ==
=== Current alignment ===
Station number	Station name			Transfer		Line name	Phase	Station distance	Total distance	Location	
Station number	Romanized	Hangul	Hanja	Transfer		Line name	Phase	in km		Location	
↑ Through-services to/from Cheongnyangni via Bundang Line (Suin–Bundang Line) ↑
K245	Suwon	수원	水原	Mugunghwa-ho and ITX-Saemaeul services		Suin Line	3	---	0.0	Gyeonggi-do	Suwon
K246	Gosaek	고색	古索			Suin Line	3			Gyeonggi-do	Suwon
K247	Omokcheon	오목천	梧木川			Suin Line	3			Gyeonggi-do	Suwon
K248	Eocheon	어천	漁川			Suin Line	3			Gyeonggi-do	Hwaseong
K249	Yamok	야목	野牧			Suin Line	3			Gyeonggi-do	Hwaseong
K250	Sari	사리	四里			Suin Line	3			Gyeonggi-do	Ansan
K251	Hanyang Univ. at Ansan	한대앞	漢大앞	Line 4 (shared)	Seoul Subway Line 4	Ansan Line	3	1.5	1.5	Gyeonggi-do	Ansan
K252	Jungang	중앙	中央	Line 4 (shared)		Ansan Line	3	1.6	3.1	Gyeonggi-do	Ansan
K253	Gojan	고잔	古棧	Line 4 (shared)		Ansan Line	3	1.4	4.5	Gyeonggi-do	Ansan
K254	Choji	초지	草芝	Line 4 (shared)	Seohae	Ansan Line	3	1.5	6.0	Gyeonggi-do	Ansan
K255	Ansan	안산	安山	Line 4 (shared)		Ansan Line	3	1.8	7.8	Gyeonggi-do	Ansan
K256	Singiloncheon	신길온천	新吉溫泉	Line 4 (shared)		Ansan Line	3	2.2	10.0	Gyeonggi-do	Ansan
K257	Jeongwang	정왕	正往	Line 4 (shared)		Ansan Line	3	2.9	12.9	Gyeonggi-do	Siheung
K258	Oido	오이도	烏耳島	Line 4 (shared)	Seoul Subway Line 4	Ansan Line	1	1.4	14.3	Gyeonggi-do	Siheung
K259	Darwol	달월	達月			Suin Line	1	2.1	16.4	Gyeonggi-do	Siheung
K260	Wolgot	월곶	月串			Suin Line	1	1.5	17.9	Gyeonggi-do	Siheung
K261	Soraepogu	소래포구	蘇萊浦口			Suin Line	1	1.3	19.2	Incheon	Namdong-gu
K262	Incheon Nonhyeon	인천논현	仁川論峴			Suin Line	1	1.0	20.2	Incheon	Namdong-gu
K263	Hogupo	호구포	虎口浦			Suin Line	1	1.3	21.5	Incheon	Namdong-gu
K264	Namdong Induspark	남동인더스파크	南洞인더스파크			Suin Line	1	1.3	22.8	Incheon	Namdong-gu
K265	Woninjae	원인재	源仁齋			Suin Line	1	1.0	23.8	Incheon	Yeonsu-gu
K266	Yeonsu	연수	延壽			Suin Line	1	0.9	24.7	Incheon	Yeonsu-gu
K267	Songdo	송도	松島			Suin Line	1	2.7	27.4	Incheon	Yeonsu-gu
K268	Hagik (2020)	학익	鶴翼			Suin Line	2			Incheon	Michuhol-gu
K269	Inha University	인하대	仁荷大			Suin Line	2	2.4	29.8	Incheon	Michuhol-gu
K270	Sungui	숭의	崇義			Suin Line	2	1.8	31.6	Incheon	Michuhol-gu
K271	Sinpo	신포	新浦			Suin Line	2	1.5	33.1	Incheon	Jemulpo-gu
K272	Incheon	인천	仁川	Wolmi Sea Train		Suin Line	2	1.1	34.2	Incheon	Jemulpo-gu

=== Former alignment ===
Station	Hangul	Hanja	Connecting Lines	Year of Closure	Location	
Suwon	수원	水原	Line 1 Gyeongbu Line; Suryeo Line	1995	Gyeonggi-do	Suwon
Gosaek	고색	古索		1974	Gyeonggi-do	Suwon
Eocheon	어천	漁川		1995	Gyeonggi-do	Hwaseong
Yamok	야목	野牧		1995	Gyeonggi-do	Hwaseong
Sari	사리	四里		1995	Gyeonggi-do	Ansan
Hanyang Univ. at Ansan	한대앞	漢大앞	Line 4 (Shared Line)	1995	Gyeonggi-do	Ansan
Jungang	중앙	中央	Line 4 (Shared Line)	1994	Gyeonggi-do	Ansan
Gojan	고잔	古棧	Line 4 (Shared Line)	1994	Gyeonggi-do	Ansan
Ansan	안산	安山	Line 4 (Shared Line)	1994	Gyeonggi-do	Ansan
Jeongwang	정왕	正往		1994	Gyeonggi-do	Siheung
Darwol	달월	達月		1994	Gyeonggi-do	Siheung
Soraepogu	소래포구	蘇來		1994	Incheon	Namdong-gu
Hogupo	논현	論峴		1992	Incheon	Namdong-gu
Namdong Induspark	남동	南洞		1992	Incheon	Namdong-gu
Songdo	송도	松島		1992	Incheon	Yeonsu-gu
Inha Univ.	용현	龍現		1973	Incheon	Nam-gu
Sungui	인천항 (남인천)	仁川港 (南仁川)		1973	Incheon	Nam-gu

== Rolling stock ==
The Suin Line used 18 Korail Class 351000 trains. They were the same as the third generation Class 351000 trains from the Bundang Line, except that they were painted red like the Gyeongui-Jungang Line and Line 1 trains. These trains have since been repainted yellow to match the color of Bundang Line trains; this was done in anticipation of the merging of the Bundang and Suin Lines into the Suin–Bundang Line.

For the former Suin Line, the Korean National Railroad built a narrow gauge steam locomotive, the KNR160 diesel car (also known as the Niigata/Kawasaki Diesel Car), and the KNR18000 passenger car. One KNR160 car (later renumbered KNR9160) and two KNR18000 car are preserved at the railroad museum in nearby Uiwang.

== Sungui Station ==
Sungui

== See also ==
- Korail
- Suryeo Line
- Transportation in South Korea
