= Nonhyeon =

- Hangul: 논현
- Hanja: 論峴
- RR: Nonhyeon
- MR: Nonhyŏn

Nonhyeon can refer to several places in South Korea.

== Administrative divisions ==
- Nonhyeon-dong, Gangnam-gu, Seoul.
- Nonhyeon-dong, Namdong-gu, Incheon.

== Railroad stations ==
- In Nonhyeon-dong, Seoul:
  - Nonhyeon Station on the Seoul Subway Line 7.
  - Sinnonhyeon Station on the Seoul Subway Line 9.
- In Nonhyeon-dong, Incheon:
  - Incheon Nonhyeon Station on the Suin Line. It was provisionally called "Nonhyeon Curtilage (Nonhyeontaekji) Station" until its opening.
  - Hogupo Station on the Suin Line. It was former "Nonhyeon Station" until the opening of the Suin Line as a part of the Seoul Metropolitan Subway system.
