= Sari station =

Sari station may refer to:

- Sari station (Ansan), South Korea
- Sari Station (Karatsu), Japan
