= Dongchun station =

Metro station in Incheon, South Korea

I131 동춘 (스퀘어원) Dongchun (Square One)
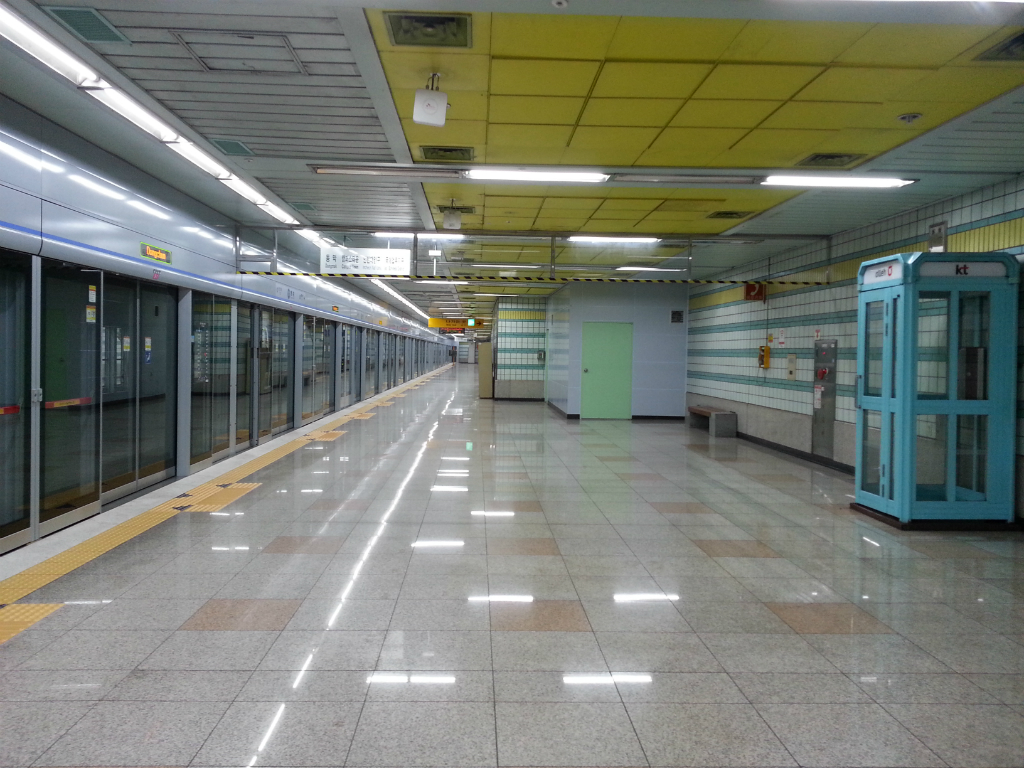

Korean name
- Hangul: 동춘역
- Hanja: 東春驛
- Revised Romanization: Dongchunnyeok
- McCune–Reischauer: Tongch'unnyŏk

General information
- Location: 926-11 Dongchun-dong, Jiha180, Gyeongwon-daero, Yeonsu-gu, Incheon
- Coordinates: 37°24′14.93″N 126°40′48.45″E
- Operator: Incheon Transit Corporation
- Line: Incheon Line 1
- Platforms: 2
- Tracks: 2

Construction
- Structure type: Underground

Other information
- Station code: I131

History
- Opened: October 6, 1999

Passengers
- 2017: 20,335

Services
Preceding station	Incheon Subway	Following station
Woninjae towards Geomdan Lake Park	Incheon Line 1	Dongmak towards Songdo Moonlight Festival Park
Location

Dongchun Station (Korean: 동춘역; Hanja: 東春驛) is a subway station on Line 1 of the Incheon Subway in Jiha180, Gyeongwon-daero, Yeonsu District, Incheon, South Korea.

== Station layout ==
G	Street Level
L1	Concourse	Faregates, Ticketing Machines, Station Control
L2; Platforms	Side platform, doors will open on the right
L2; Platforms	Westbound	← Incheon Line 1 toward Geomdan Lake Park (Woninjae)
L2; Platforms	Eastbound	→ Incheon Line 1 toward Songdo Moonlight Festival Park (Dongmak) →
L2; Platforms	Side platform, doors will open on the right

== Exits ==
Exit No.	Image	Destinations
1		E-mart with Starbucks on the first floor.
2		Namdong industrial complex, E-mart
3		Namdong industrial complex, E-mart
4		Dongmak elementary school Incheon girls' middle school Dongchun-3-dong office Cheongliang middle school Cheongliang elementary school Songdo park
5		Korea Exchange Bank
6		Yeonsu-gu office Yeonseong elementary school Yeonsu police office Yeonseong middle school Dongchun-3-dong office
