= Omokcheon station =

Metro station in Suwon, South Korea

오목천 (수원여대); Omokcheon (Suwon Women's Univ.)
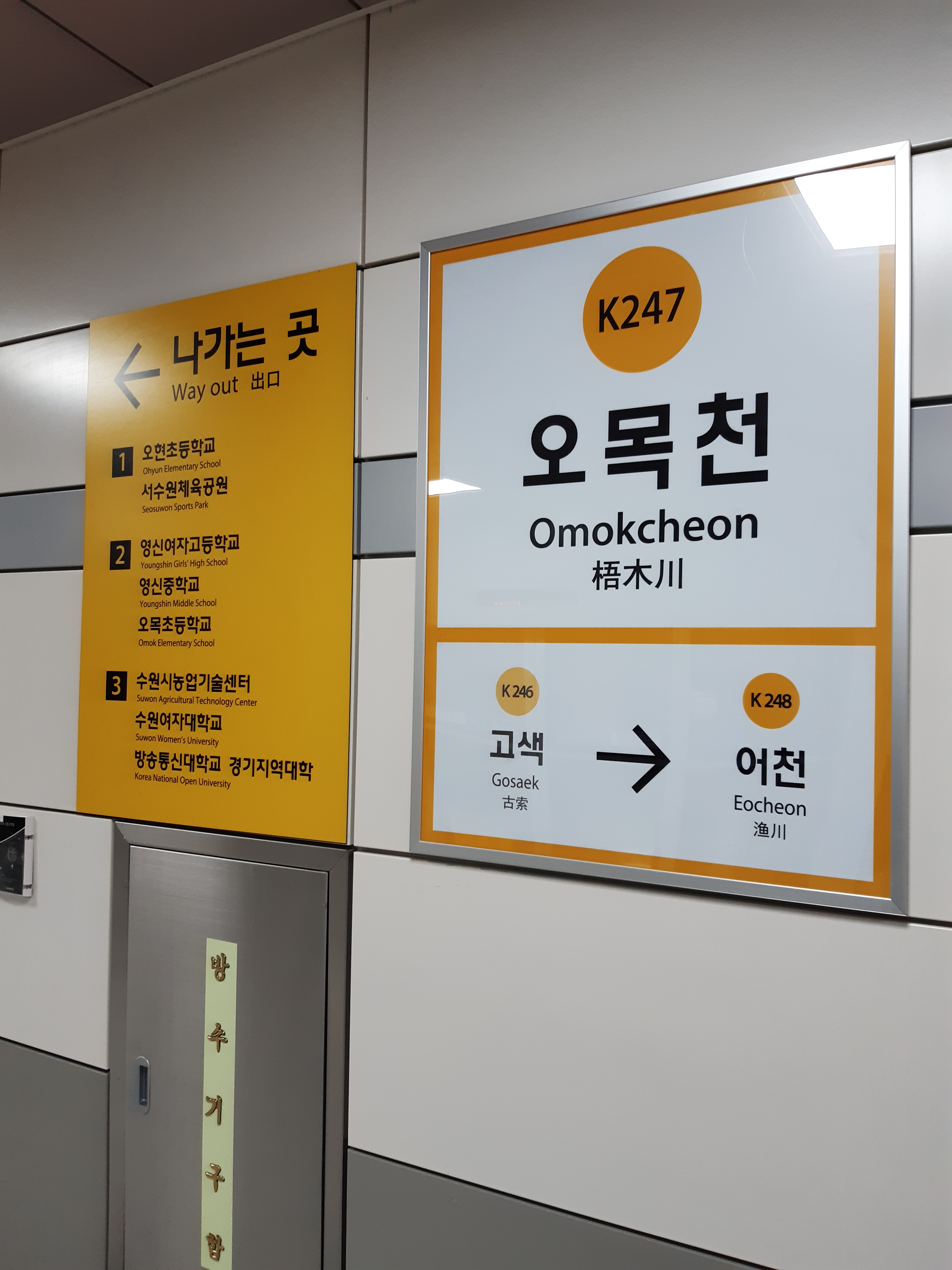

Korean name
- Hangul: 오목천역
- Hanja: 梧木川驛
- RR: Omokcheon-yeok
- MR: Omokch'ŏn-yŏk

General information
- Location: 1576 Samcheonbyongmaro, Gwonseon-gu, Suwon, Gyeonggi-do
- Operator: Korail
- Line: Suin–Bundang Line
- Platforms: 2
- Tracks: 2

Construction
- Structure type: Underground

Key dates
- September 12, 2020: Suin–Bundang Line opened
Location

Omokcheon station is a railroad station on the Suin–Bundang Line of the Seoul Metropolitan Subway in Suwon, Gyeonggi Province, South Korea. It opened on 12 September 2020.

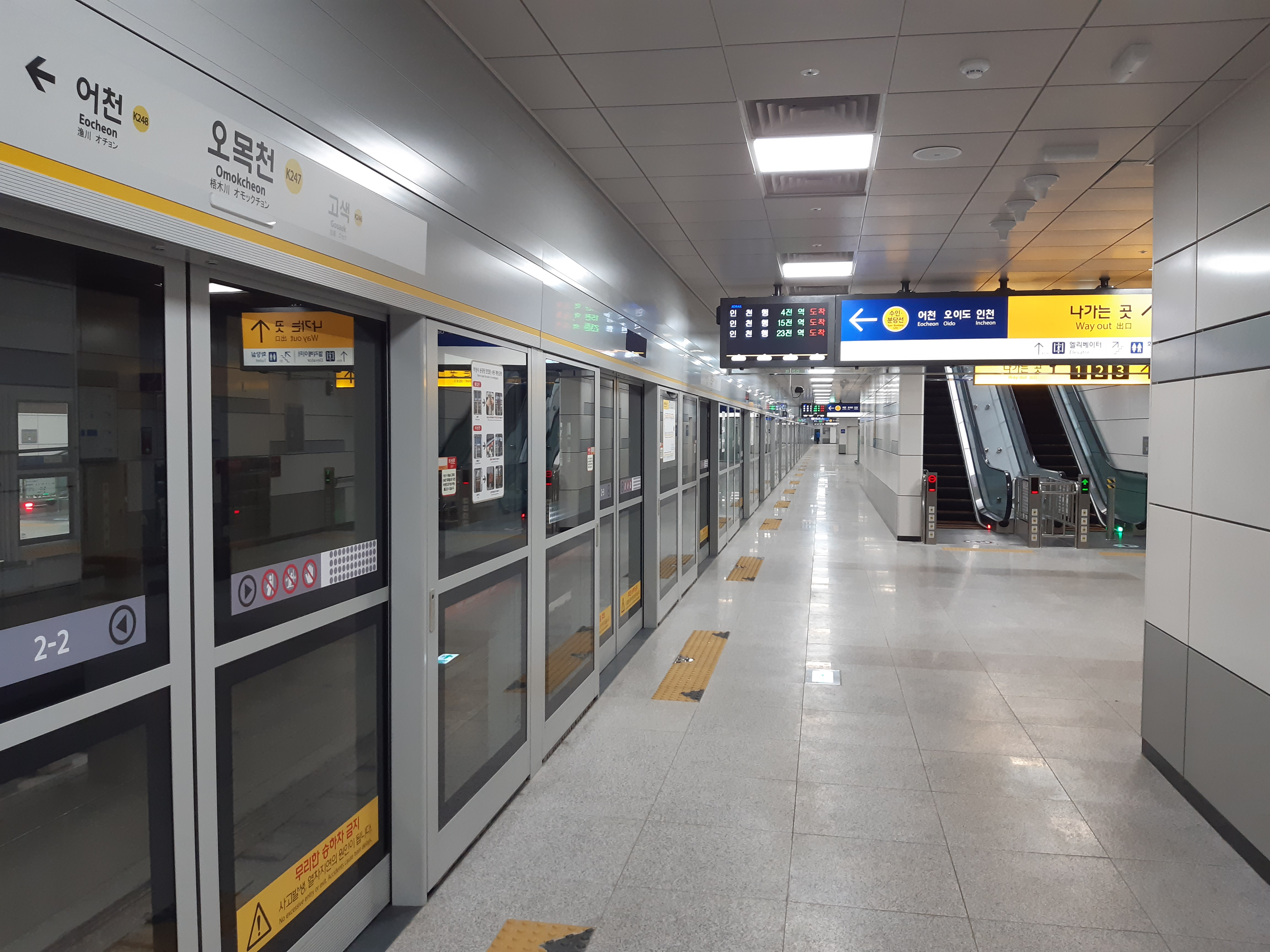

Preceding station	Seoul Metropolitan Subway	Following station
Gosaek towards Cheongnyangni	Suin–Bundang Line	Eocheon towards Incheon
