= Namdong Induspark station =

Metro station in Incheon, South Korea

남동인더스파크; Namdong Induspark
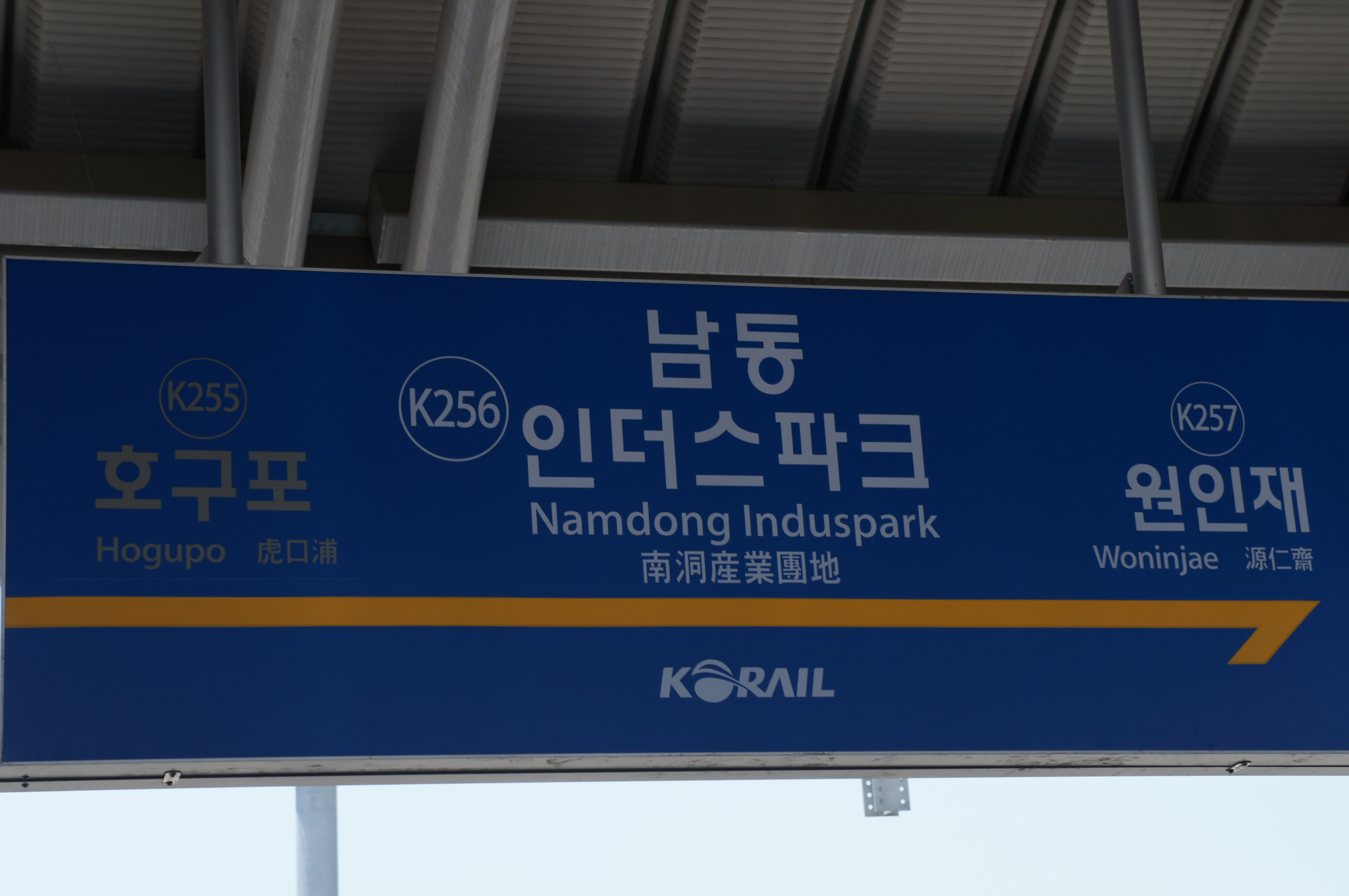

Korean name
- Hangul: 남동인더스파크역
- Hanja: 南洞인더스파크驛
- Revised Romanization: Namdongindeoseupakeuyeok
- McCune–Reischauer: Namdongindŏsŭp'ak'ŭyŏk

General information
- Location: 970-14 Gojan-dong, Namdong-gu, Incheon
- Coordinates: 37.407767°N 126.695237°E
- Operator: Korail
- Line: Suin–Bundang Line
- Platforms: 2
- Tracks: 2

Construction
- Structure type: Aboveground

Key dates
- June 30, 2012: Suin–Bundang Line opened
Location

Namdong Induspark Station is a subway station on the Korail-operated Suin–Bundang Line in Namdong District, Incheon, which opened on June 30, 2012.

Preceding station	Seoul Metropolitan Subway	Following station
Hogupo towards Cheongnyangni	Suin–Bundang Line	Woninjae towards Incheon
