= Wolgot station =

Station of the Seoul Metropolitan Subway

월곶; Wolgot
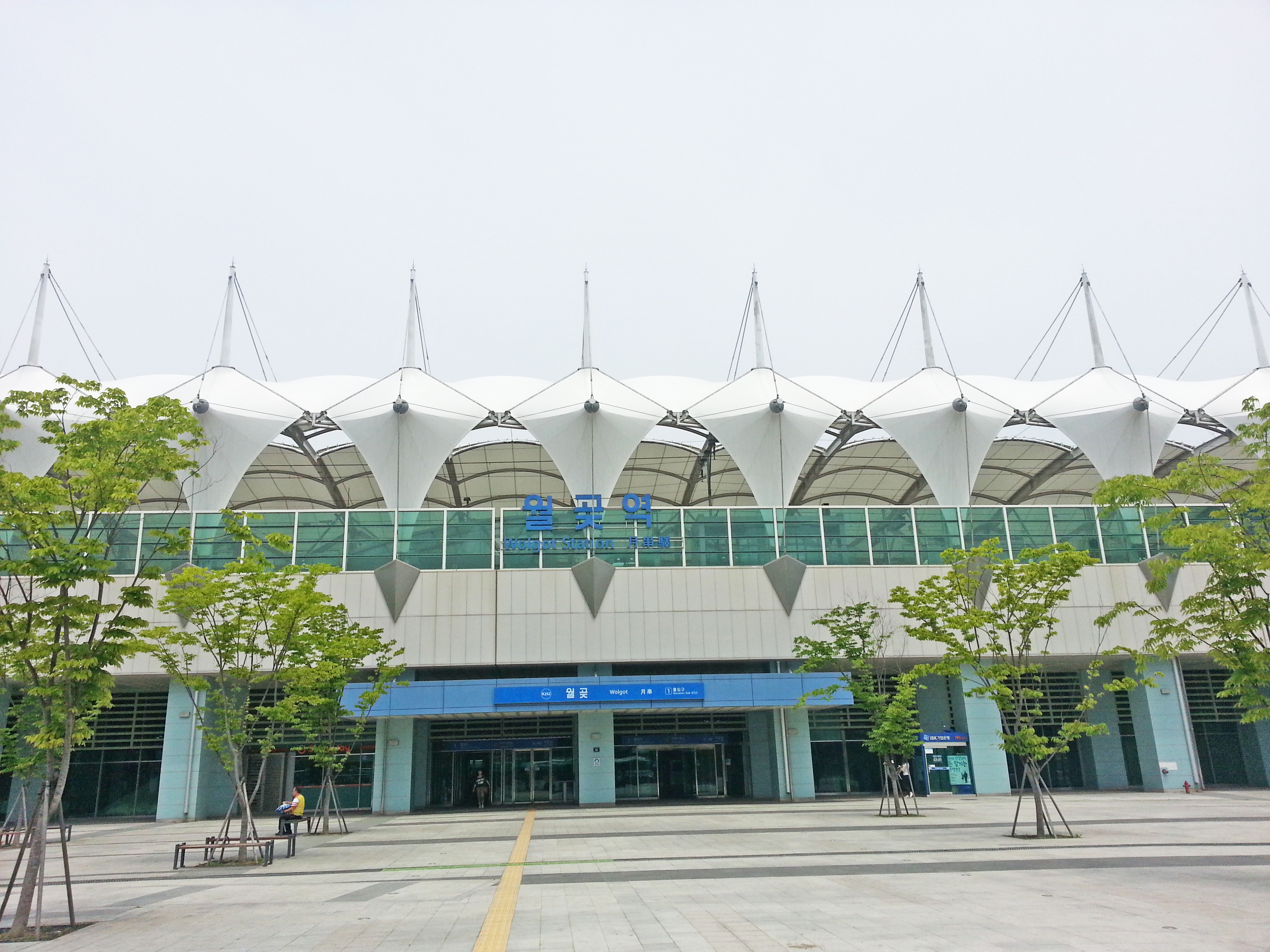

Korean name
- Hangul: 월곶역
- Hanja: 月串驛
- Revised Romanization: Wolgot-yeok
- McCune–Reischauer: Wŏlgot-yŏk

General information
- Location: Siheung, Gyeonggi Province, South Korea
- Coordinates: 37.391846°N 126.742702°E
- Operator: Korail
- Line: Suin–Bundang Line
- Platforms: 2
- Tracks: 2

Construction
- Structure type: Aboveground

History
- Opened: June 30, 2012

Services
Preceding station	Seoul Metropolitan Subway	Following station
Darwol towards Cheongnyangni	Suin–Bundang Line	Soraepogu towards Incheon
Location

Wolgot station (Korean: 월곶역; Hanja: 月串驛) is a railroad station on the Suin–Bundang Line in Siheung, Gyeonggi Province, South Korea. It opened on 30 June 2012. There are many Seafood restaurants located near the station. When the Gyeonggang Line (Wolgot-Pangyo Line) opened, it will become a transfer station in the future.

== Station layout ==
L2; Platforms
L2; Platforms	Through tracks	Suin-Bundang Line does not stop here →
L2; Platforms	Island platform, doors will open on the left
L2; Platforms	Eastbound	Suin-Bundang Line toward Incheon (Soraepogu) →
L2; Platforms	Westbound	← Suin-Bundang Line toward Cheongnyangni (Darwol)
L2; Platforms	Island platform, doors will open on the left
L2; Platforms	Through tracks	← Suin-Bundang Line does not stop here

L1; Concourse	Lobby	Customer Service, Shops, Vending machines, ATMs

G	Street level	Exit
