= Yeonsu station =

Metro station in Incheon, South Korea

연수; Yeonsu
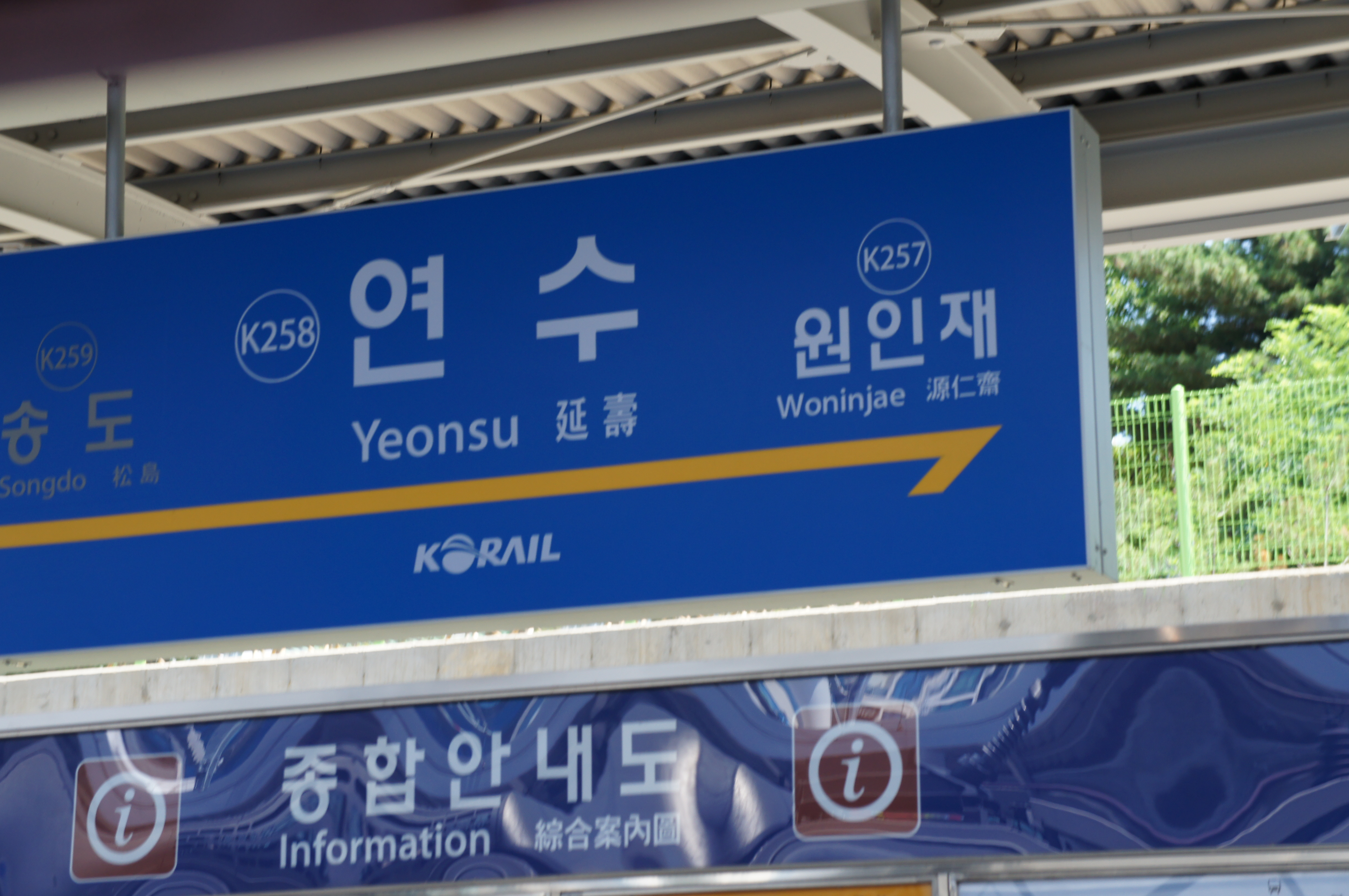

Korean name
- Hangul: 연수역
- Hanja: 延壽驛
- Revised Romanization: Yeonsu-yeok
- McCune–Reischauer: Yŏnsu-yŏk

General information
- Location: 347 Yeonsu-dong, Yeonsu-gu; Incheon
- Coordinates: 37.417771°N 126.678994°E
- Operator: Korail
- Line: Suin–Bundang Line
- Platforms: 2
- Tracks: 2

Construction
- Structure type: Aboveground

Key dates
- June 30, 2012: Suin–Bundang Line opened
Location

Yeonsu Station is a subway station on the Korail-operated Suin–Bundang Line in Yeonsu District, Incheon, which opened on June 30, 2012.

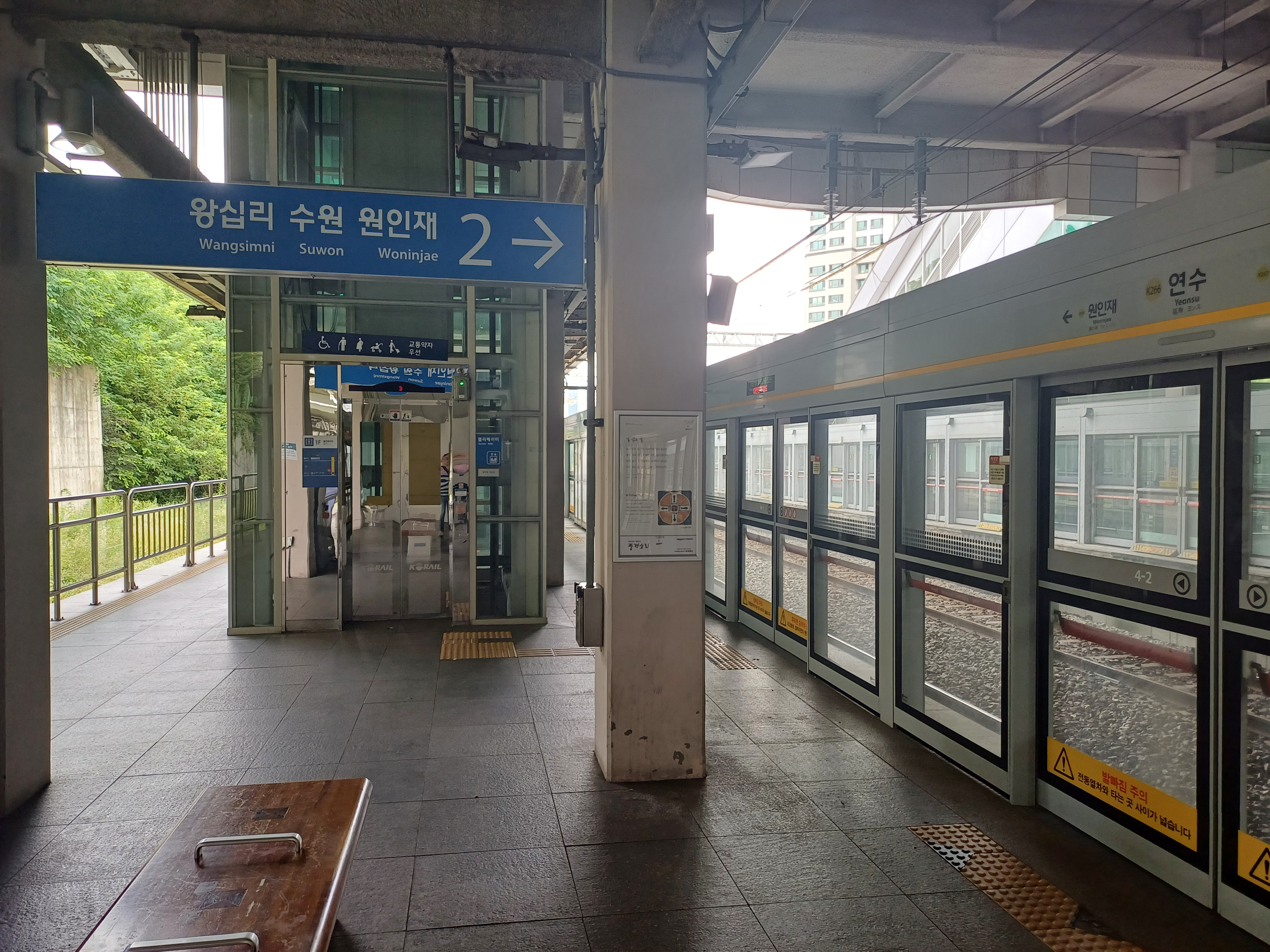

Preceding station	Seoul Metropolitan Subway	Following station
Woninjae towards Cheongnyangni	Suin–Bundang Line	Songdo towards Incheon
Woninjae towards Oido	Suin–Bundang Line Suin Express Line	Inha University towards Incheon
