= Eocheon station =

Metro station in Hwaseong, South Korea

Coordinates: 37°14′59″N 126°54′33″E

어천; Eocheon
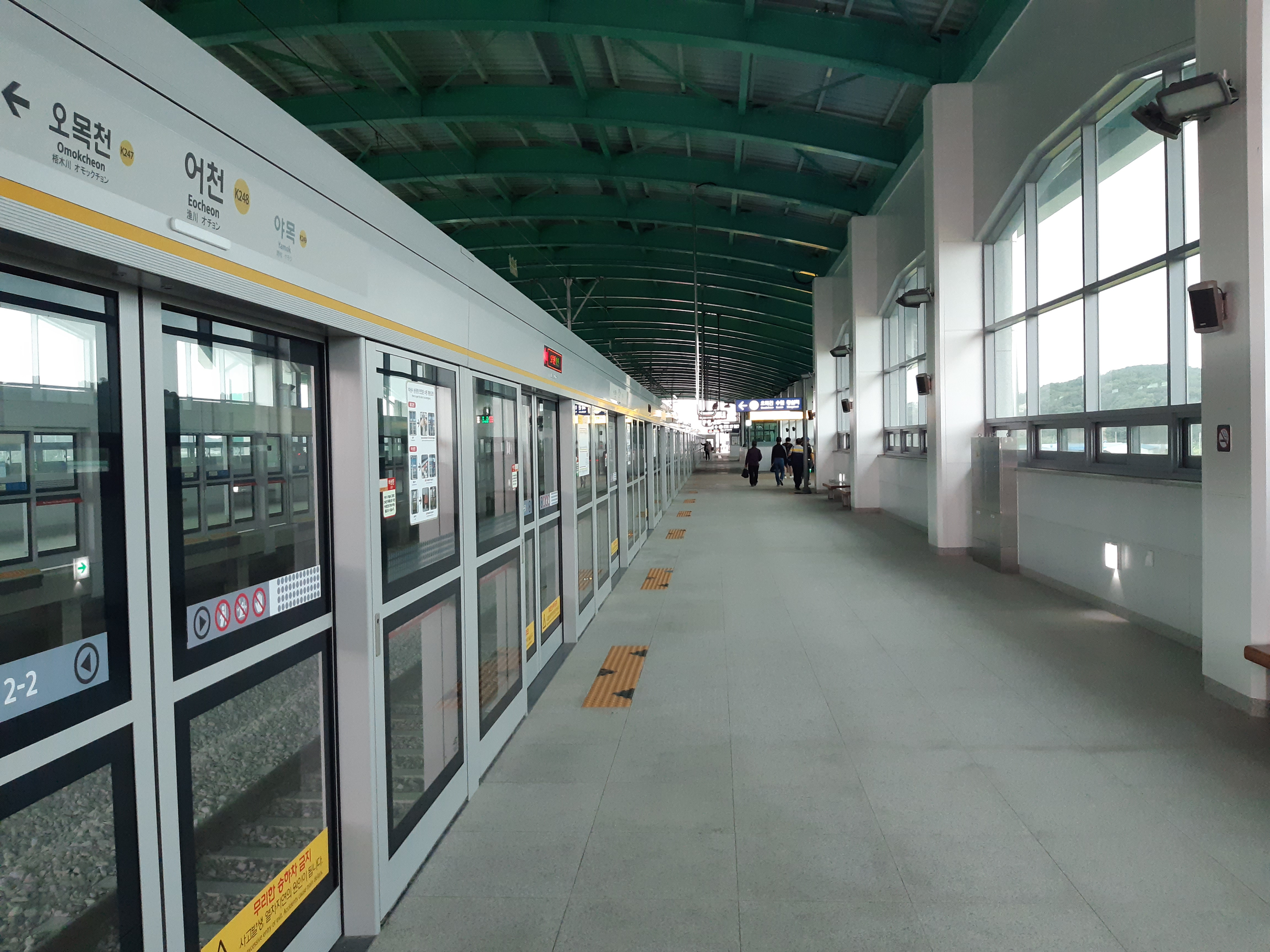
- Platform

Korean name
- Hangul: 어천역
- Hanja: 漁川驛
- RR: Eocheon-yeok
- MR: Ŏch'ŏn-yŏk

General information
- Location: 410 Eocheon-ri, Maesong-myeon, Hwaseong, Gyeonggi-do
- Line: Suin–Bundang Line
- Platforms: 2
- Tracks: 2

Construction
- Structure type: Aboveground

Key dates
- September 12, 2020: Suin–Bundang Line opened
Location

Eocheon Station (Korean: 어천역) is a station on the Suin–Bundang Line. It reopened on 12 September 2020.

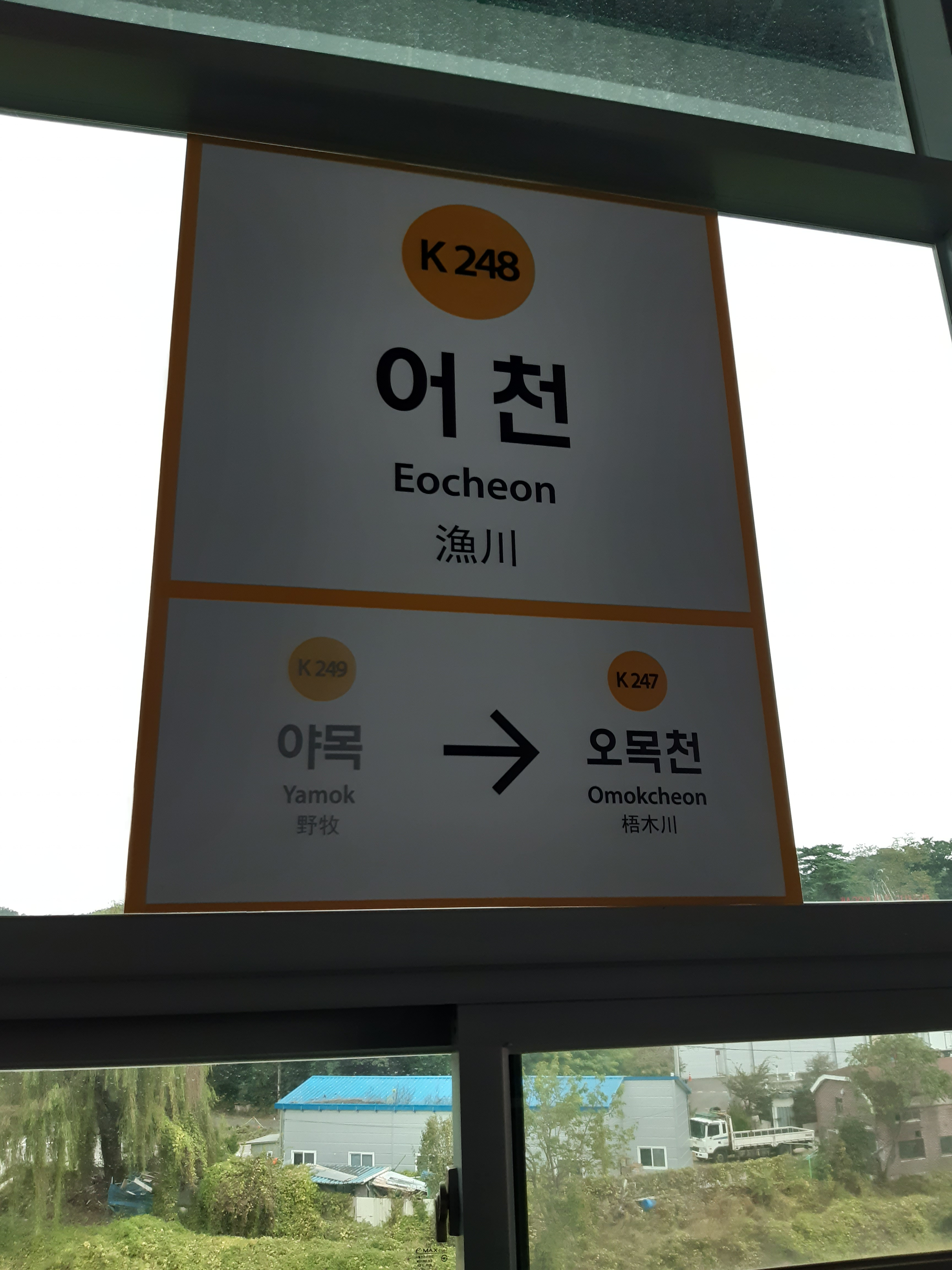
Station nameplate

Preceding station	Seoul Metropolitan Subway	Following station
Omokcheon towards Cheongnyangni	Suin–Bundang Line	Yamok towards Incheon
