= Yamok station =

Station of the Seoul Metropolitan Subway

야목; Yamok
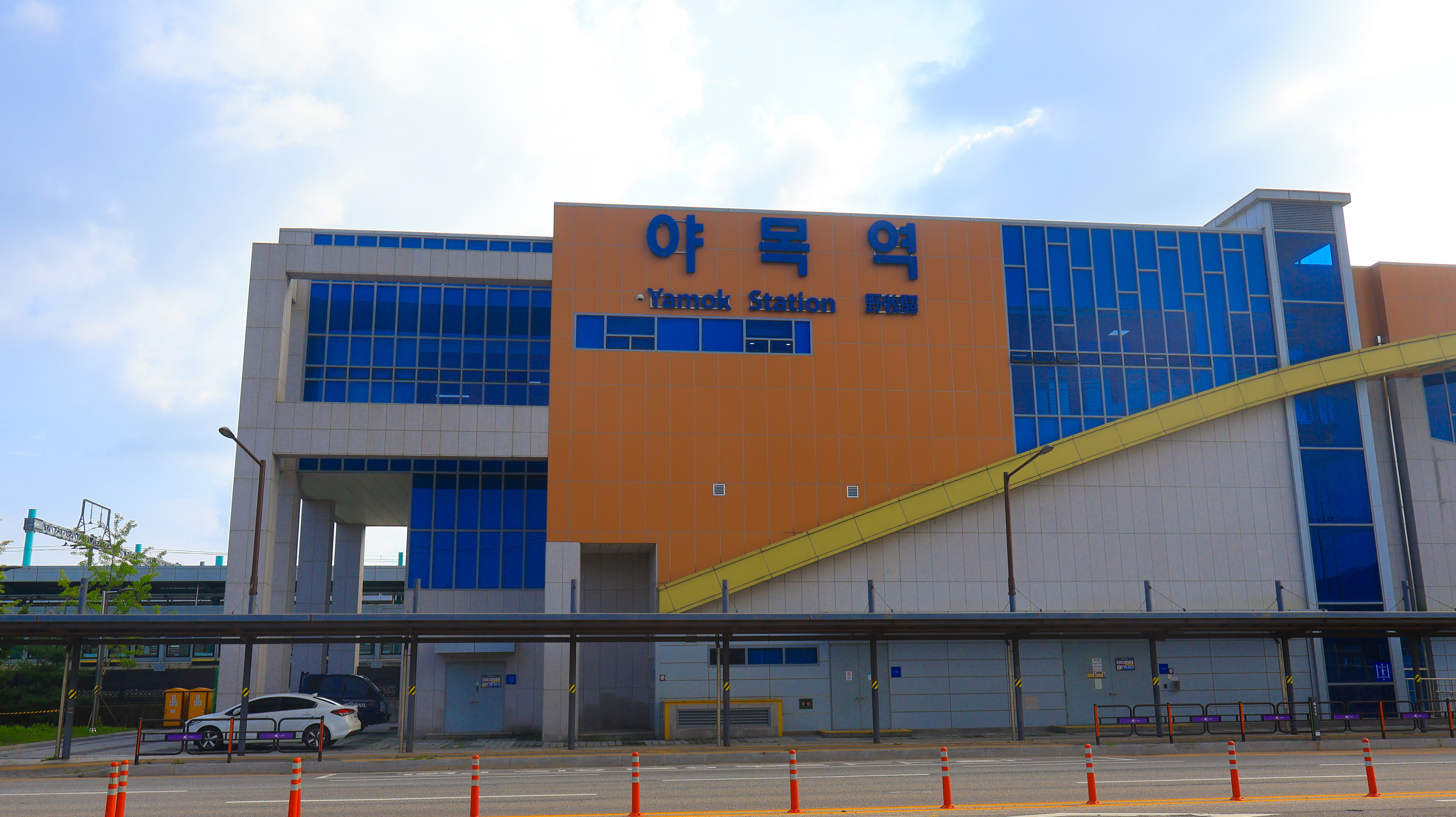
- Yamok Station (2024)

Korean name
- Hangul: 야목역
- Hanja: 野牧驛
- RR: Yamok-yeok
- MR: Yamok-yŏk

General information
- Location: 792-2 Yamok-ri, Maesong-myeon, Hwaseong, Gyeonggi-do
- Coordinates: 37°15′40.00″N 126°53′03.70″E
- Operator: Korail
- Line: Suin–Bundang Line
- Platforms: 2
- Tracks: 5

Construction
- Structure type: Aboveground

Key dates
- September 12, 2020: Suin–Bundang Line opened
Location

Yamok station is a railroad station on the Suin–Bundang Line of the Seoul Metropolitan Subway in Hwaseong, Gyeonggi Province, South Korea. It opened on 12 September 2020.

== Gallery ==
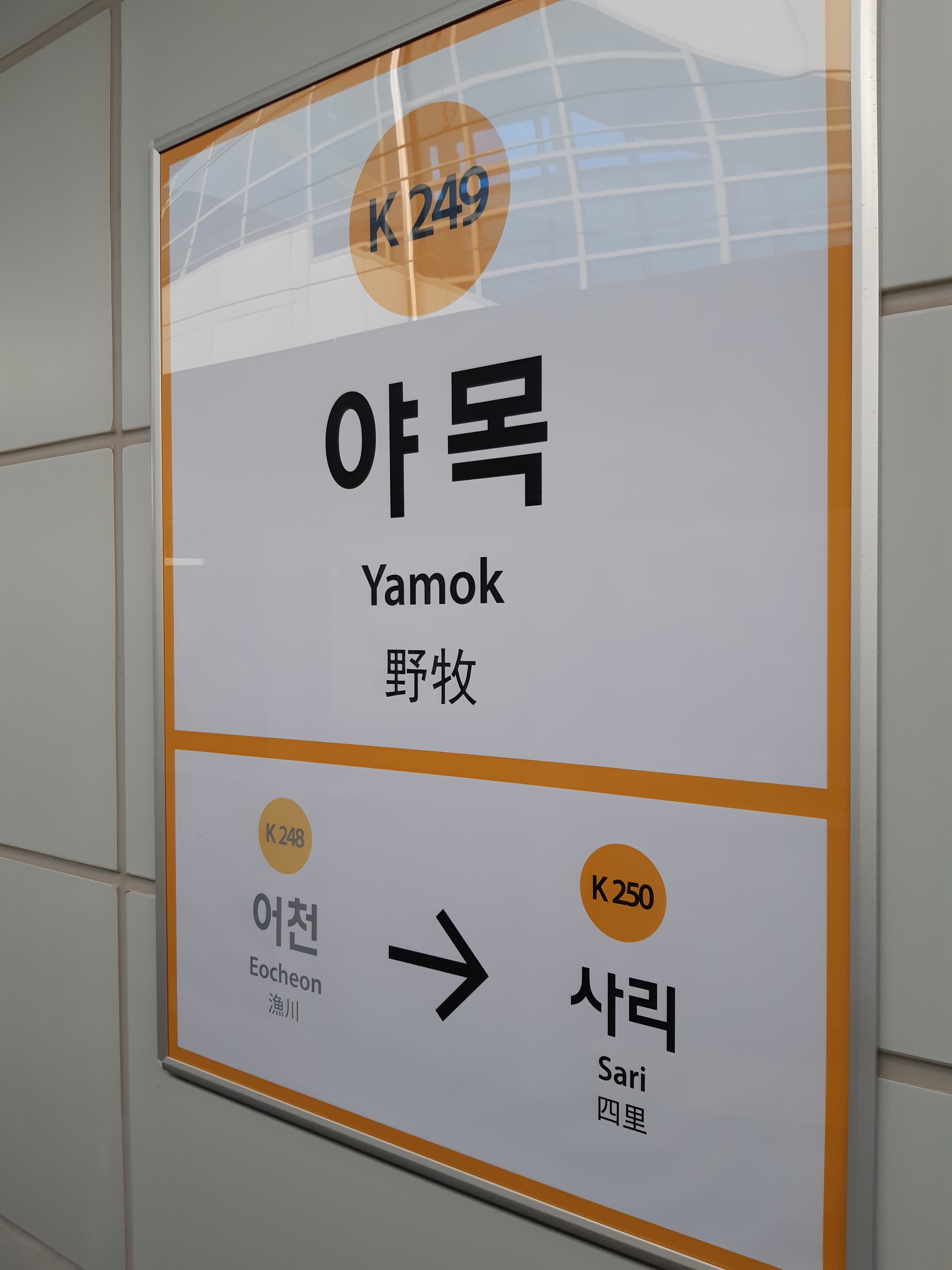
Station name plate on platform

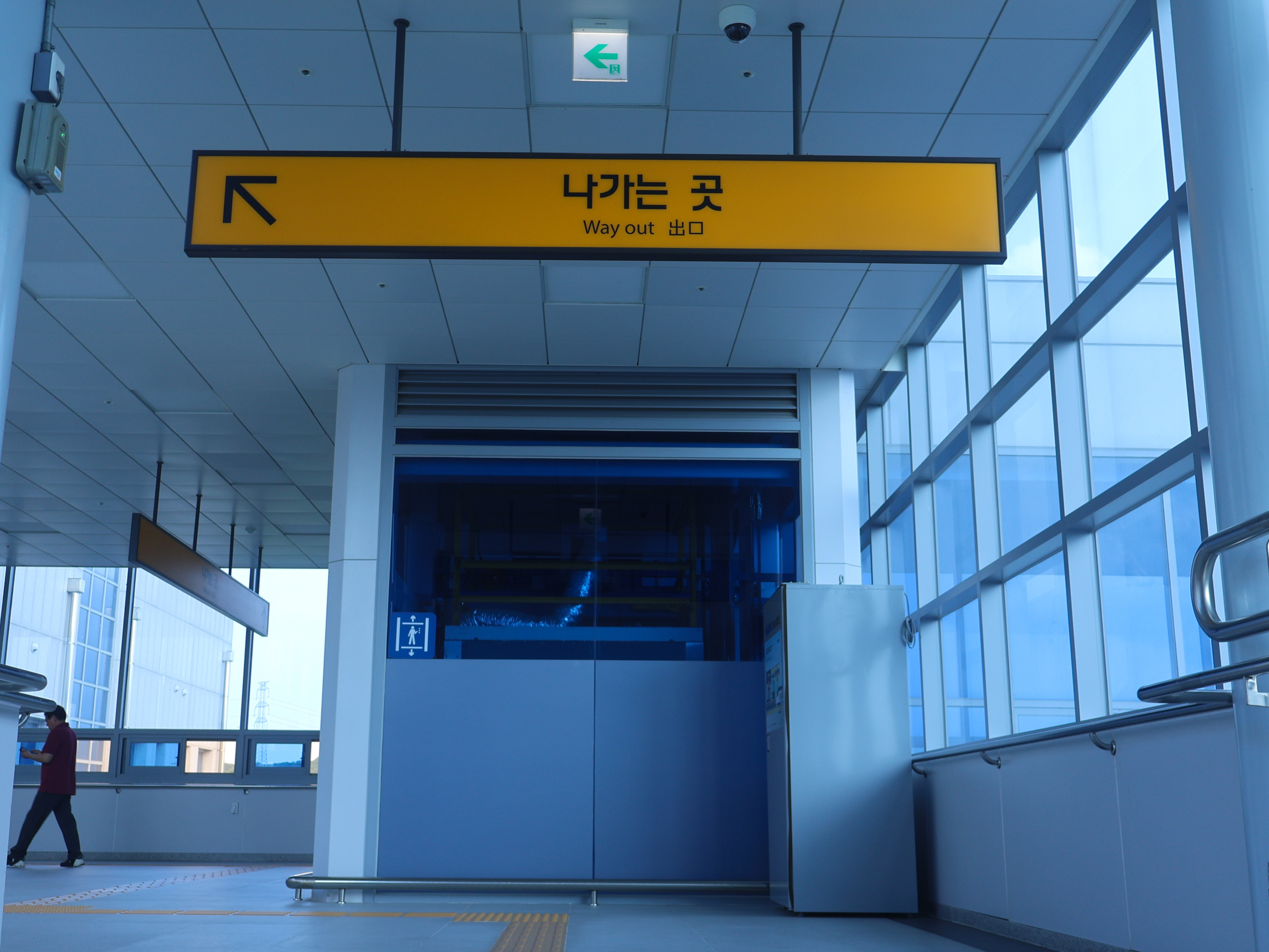
Exit 1

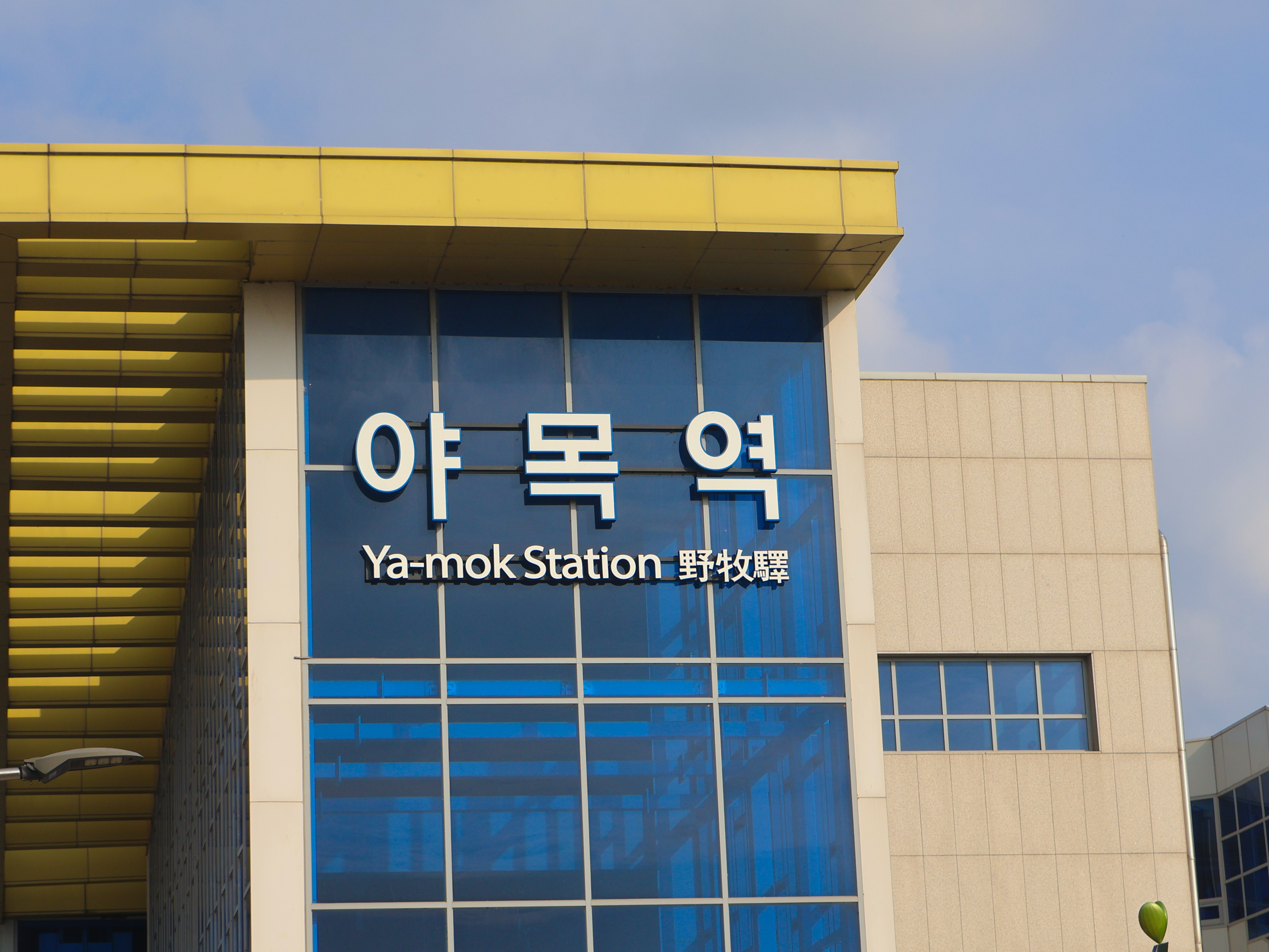
Station signboard

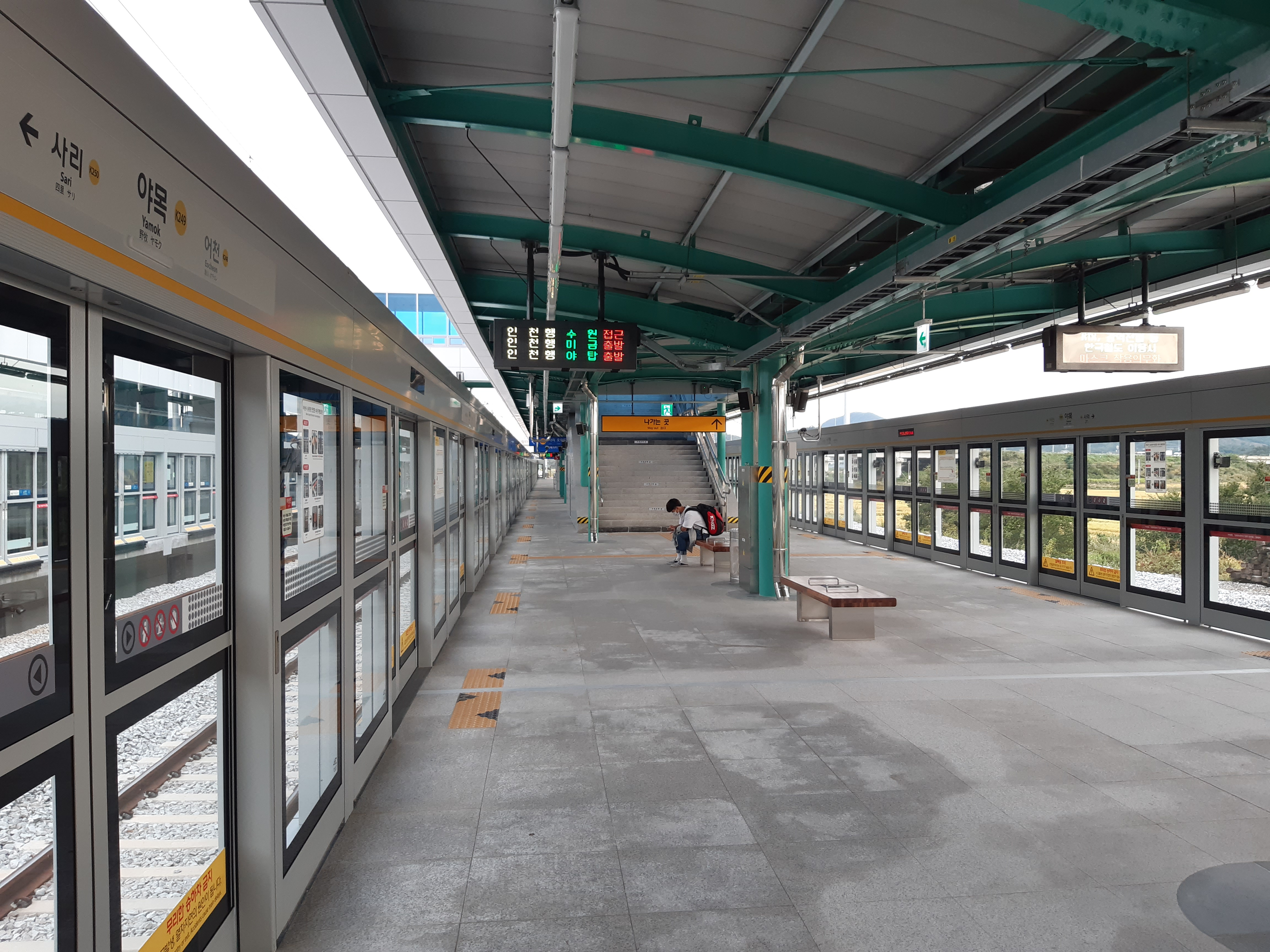
Platforms

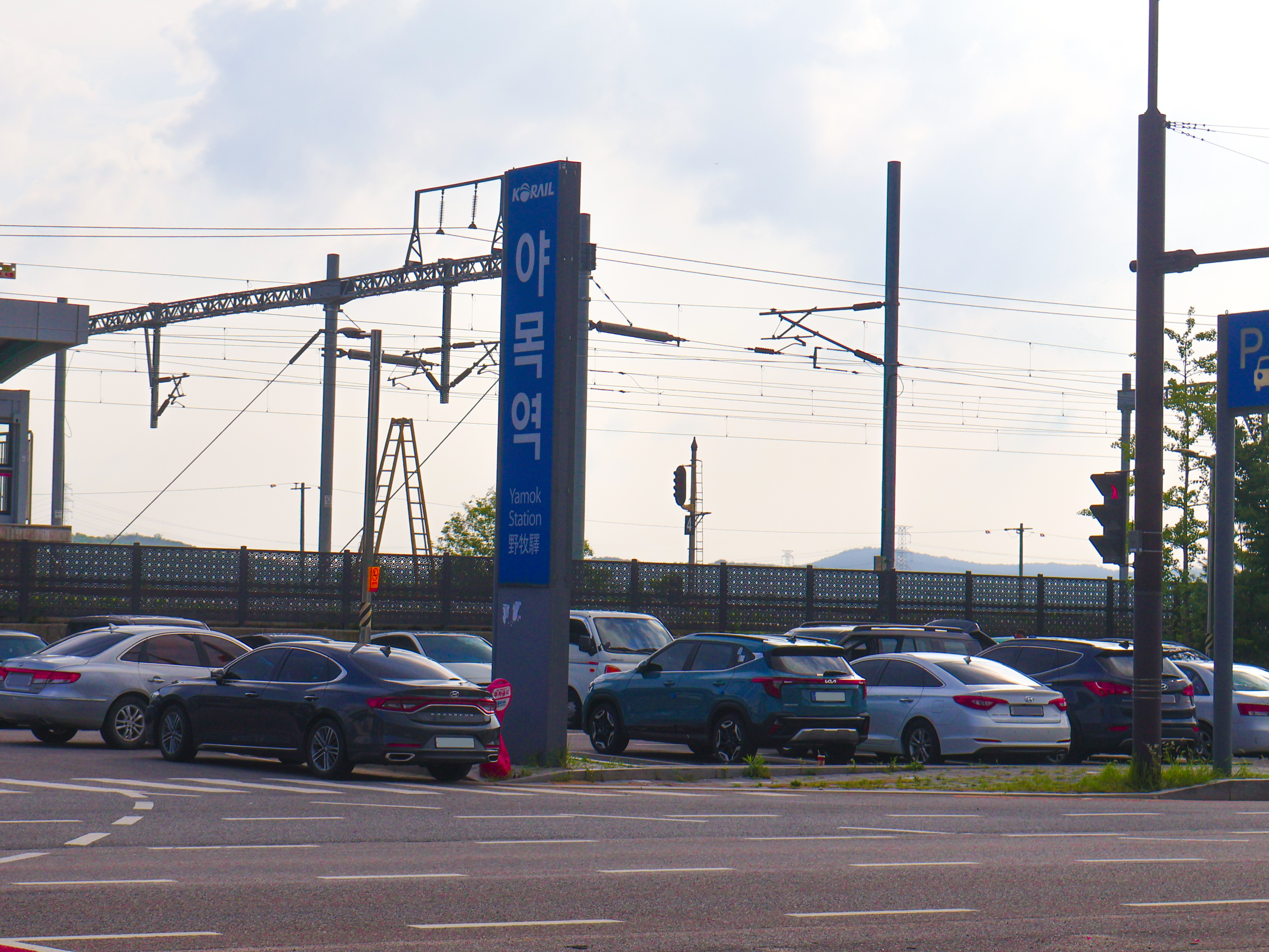
Parking

Preceding station	Seoul Metropolitan Subway	Following station
Eocheon towards Cheongnyangni	Suin–Bundang Line	Sari towards Incheon
