= Soraepogu station =

Metro station in Incheon, South Korea

소래포구; Soraepogu
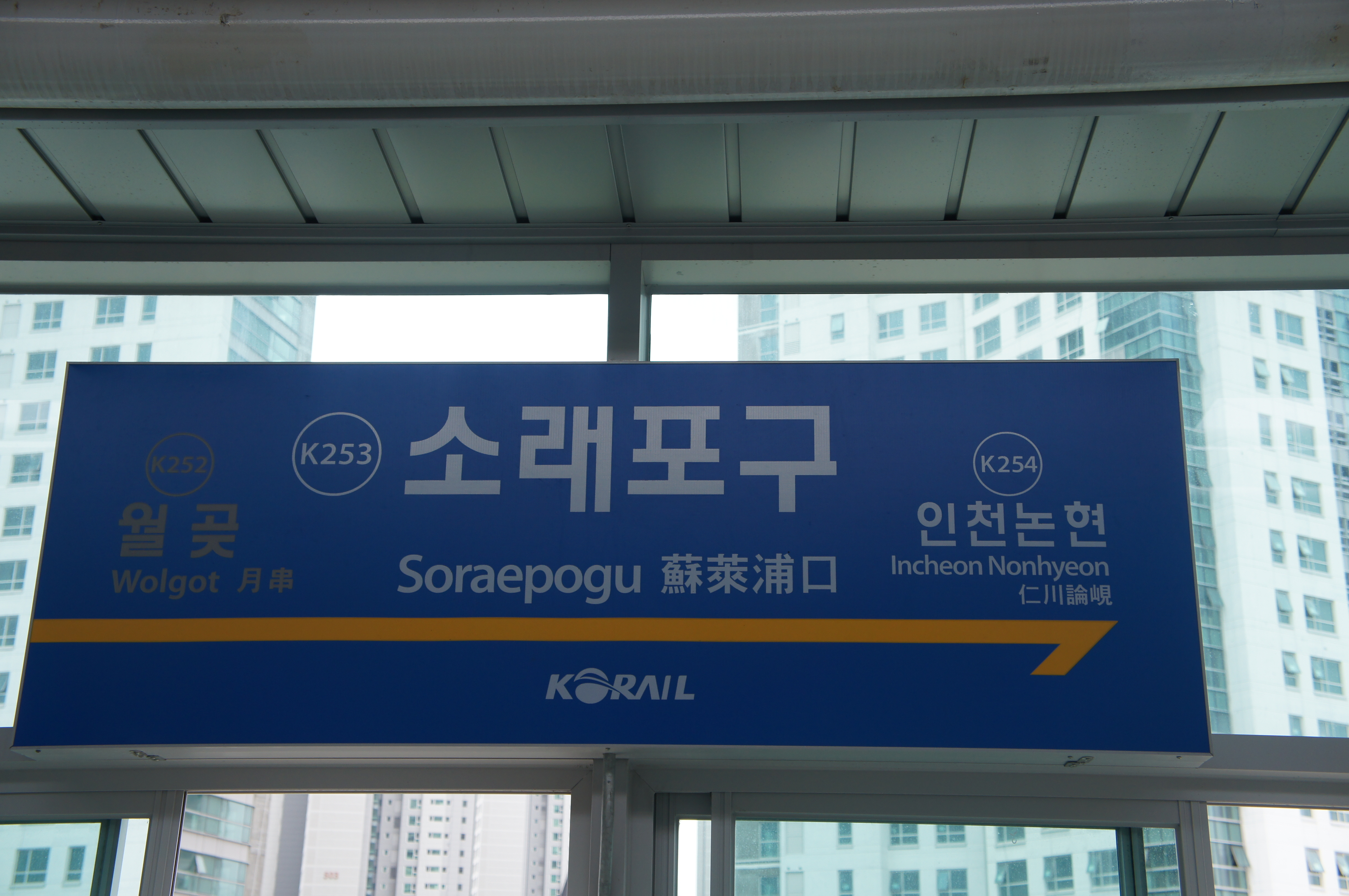

Korean name
- Hangul: 소래포구역
- Hanja: 蘇萊浦口驛
- Revised Romanization: Soraepogu-yeok
- McCune–Reischauer: Soraep'ogu-yŏk

General information
- Location: Namdong-gu, Incheon
- Coordinates: 37.400966°N 126.733539°E
- Operator: Korail
- Line: Suin–Bundang Line
- Platforms: 2
- Tracks: 2

Construction
- Structure type: Aboveground

Key dates
- June 30, 2012: Suin–Bundang Line opened
Location

Soraepogu Station is a railway station on the Suin–Bundang Line in Namdong-gu, Incheon, South Korea. It opened on 30 June 2012. There are many stores and restaurants located around the station, including a large seafood complex. Near the station is a walkway along the ocean inlet with a metal lobster sculpture.

== Gallery ==
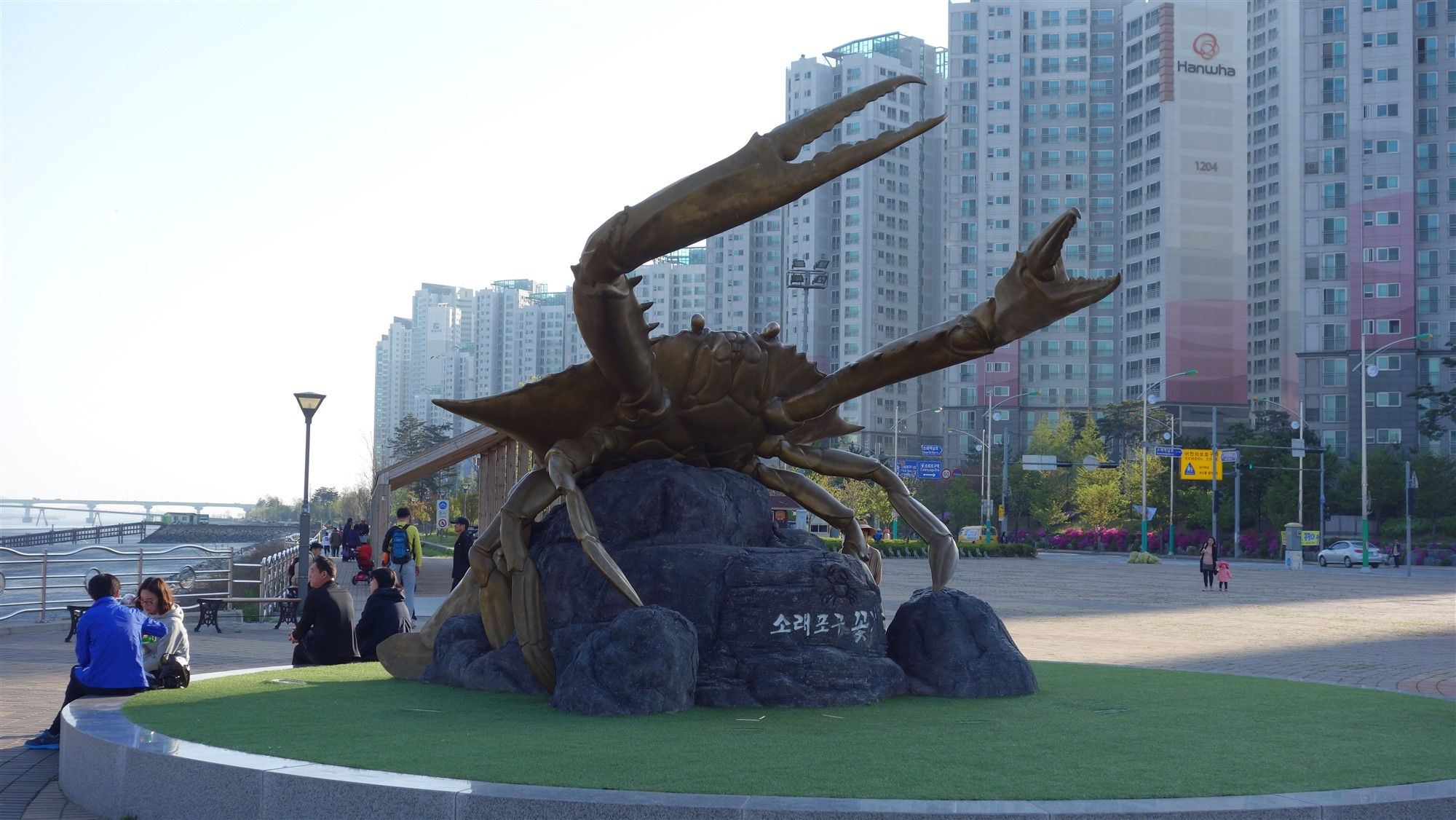
Soraepogu lobster sculpture

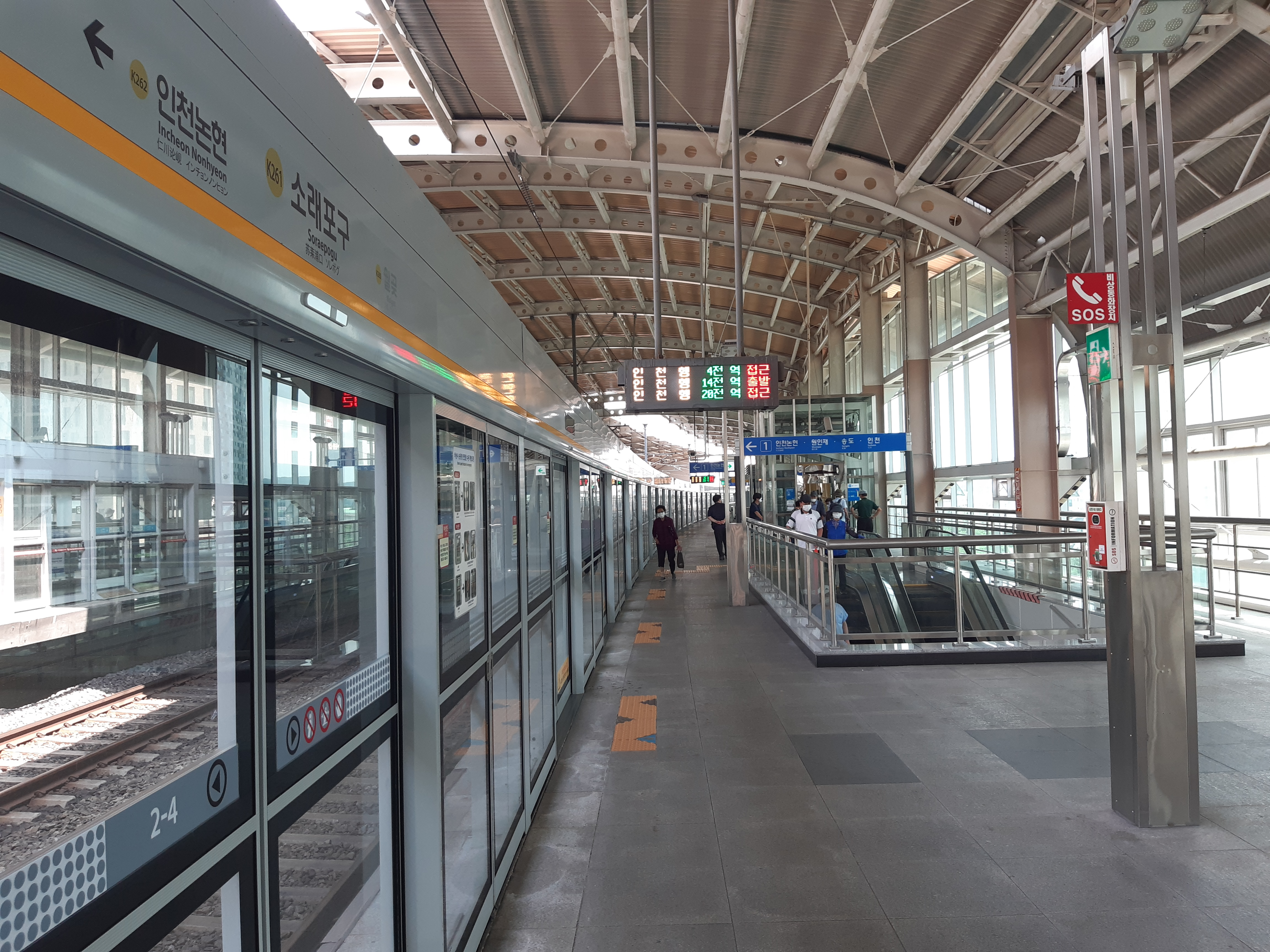
The platform in 2021

Preceding station	Seoul Metropolitan Subway	Following station
Wolgot towards Cheongnyangni	Suin–Bundang Line	Incheon Nonhyeon towards Incheon
Oido Terminus	Suin–Bundang Line Suin Express Line	Incheon Nonhyeon towards Incheon
