= Woninjae station =

Metro station in Incheon, South Korea

Coordinates: 37°24′44.66″N 126°41′16.46″E

I130
원인재
Woninjae
원인재; Woninjae
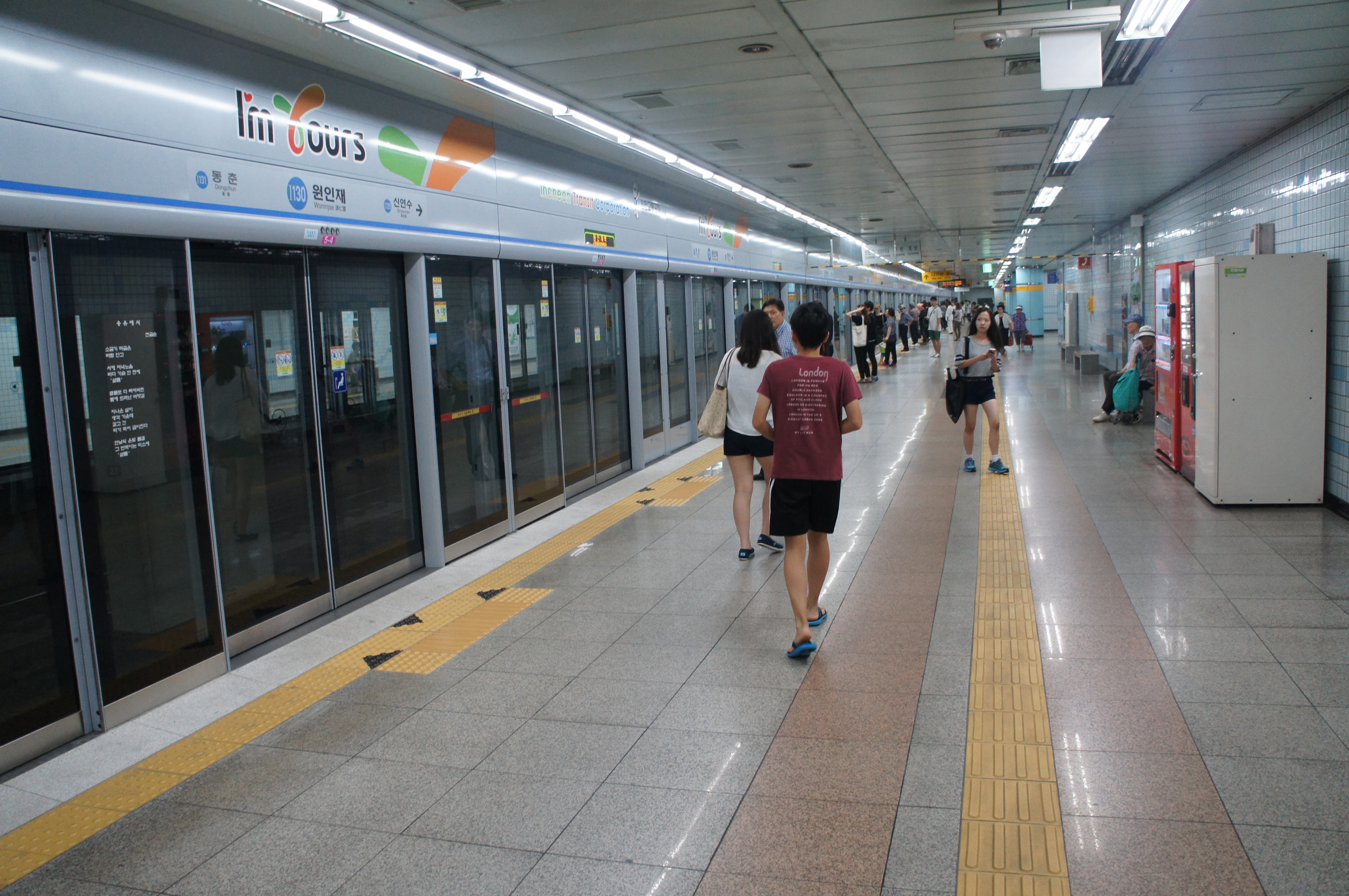

Korean name
- Hangul: 원인재역
- Hanja: 源仁齋驛
- Revised Romanization: Woninjaeyeok
- McCune–Reischauer: Wŏninjaeyŏk

General information
- Location: 119-4 Yeonsu-dong, Yeonsu-gu, Incheon
- Operator: Incheon Transit Corporation, Korail
- Lines: Incheon Line 1 Suin–Bundang Line
- Platforms: 4
- Tracks: 4

Construction
- Structure type: Underground (Line 1); Aboveground (Suin Line)
- Cycle facilities: Yes

Key dates
- October 6, 1999: Incheon Line 1 opened
- June 30, 2012: Suin–Bundang Line opened

Passengers
- 2017: Suin Line: 2,209; Line 1: 5,784

Services
Preceding station	Incheon Subway	Following station
Sinyeonsu towards Geomdan Lake Park	Incheon Line 1	Dongchun towards Songdo Moonlight Festival Park
Preceding station	Seoul Metropolitan Subway	Following station
Namdong Induspark towards Cheongnyangni	Suin–Bundang Line	Yeonsu towards Incheon
Incheon Nonhyeon towards Oido	Suin–Bundang Line Suin Express Line	Yeonsu towards Incheon
Location

Woninjae Station is a commuter train station on Line 1 of the Incheon Subway and the Suin–Bundang Line of the Seoul Metropolitan Subway. The station became a transfer point to the above-ground Suin Line in July 2012. The platforms of these two lines are located far apart, requiring passengers to walk a long distance when transferring.

== Exits ==
Exit No.	Image	Destinations
1		Kookmin bank Namdong industrial complex
2		Namdong industrial complex
3		Yeonsu police office Yeonsu telecommunications office Yeonhwa elementary school Yeonsu high school Downtown Yeonsu-gu
4		Joongang elementary school Yeonsu middle school
5		Seonggi Village Residents' Meeting
6		Seonggi Village Residents' Meeting

== Gallery ==
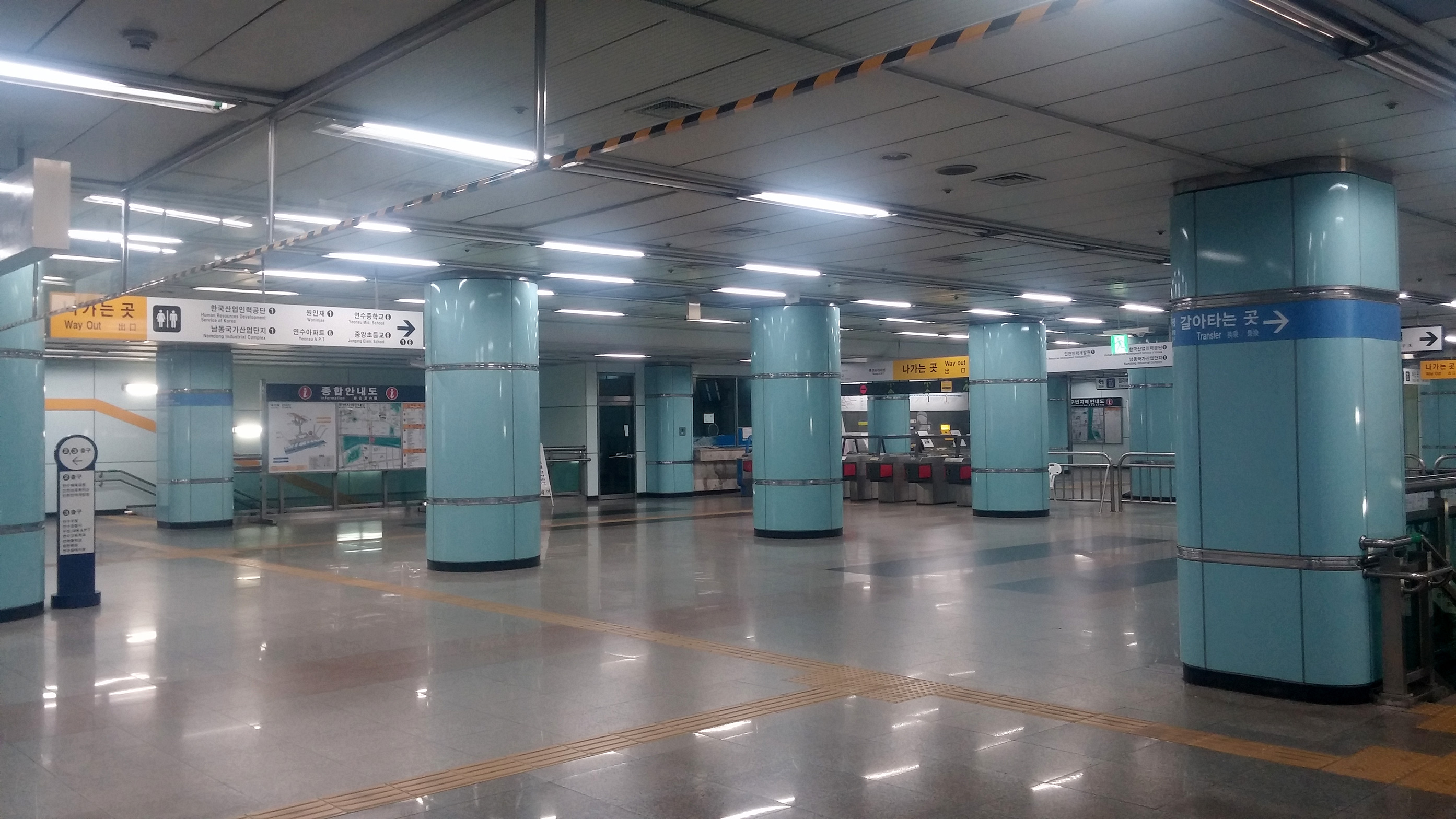
Interior in Woninjae Station

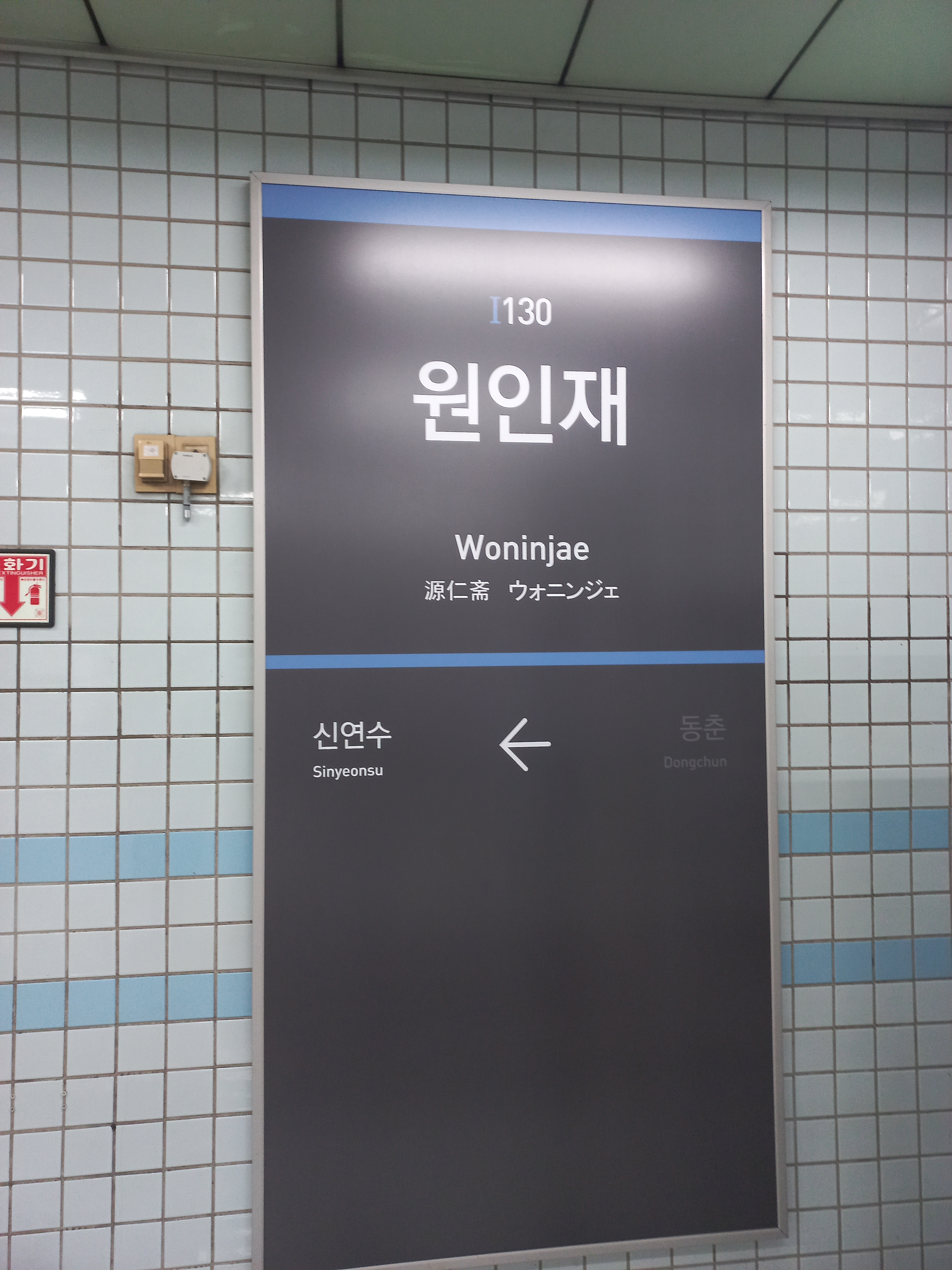
Incheon Subway Line 1 station sign

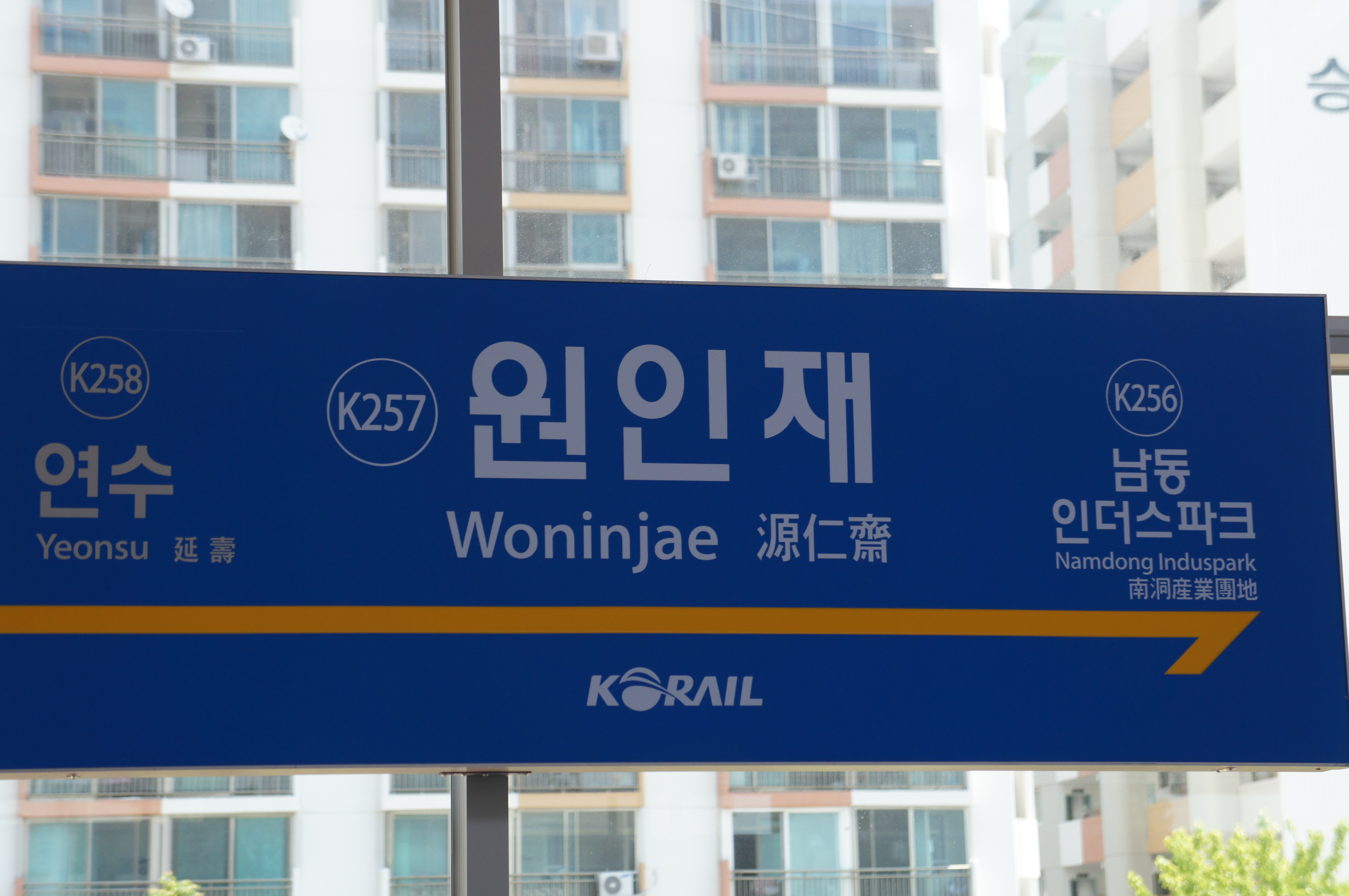
Suin–Bundang Line station sign

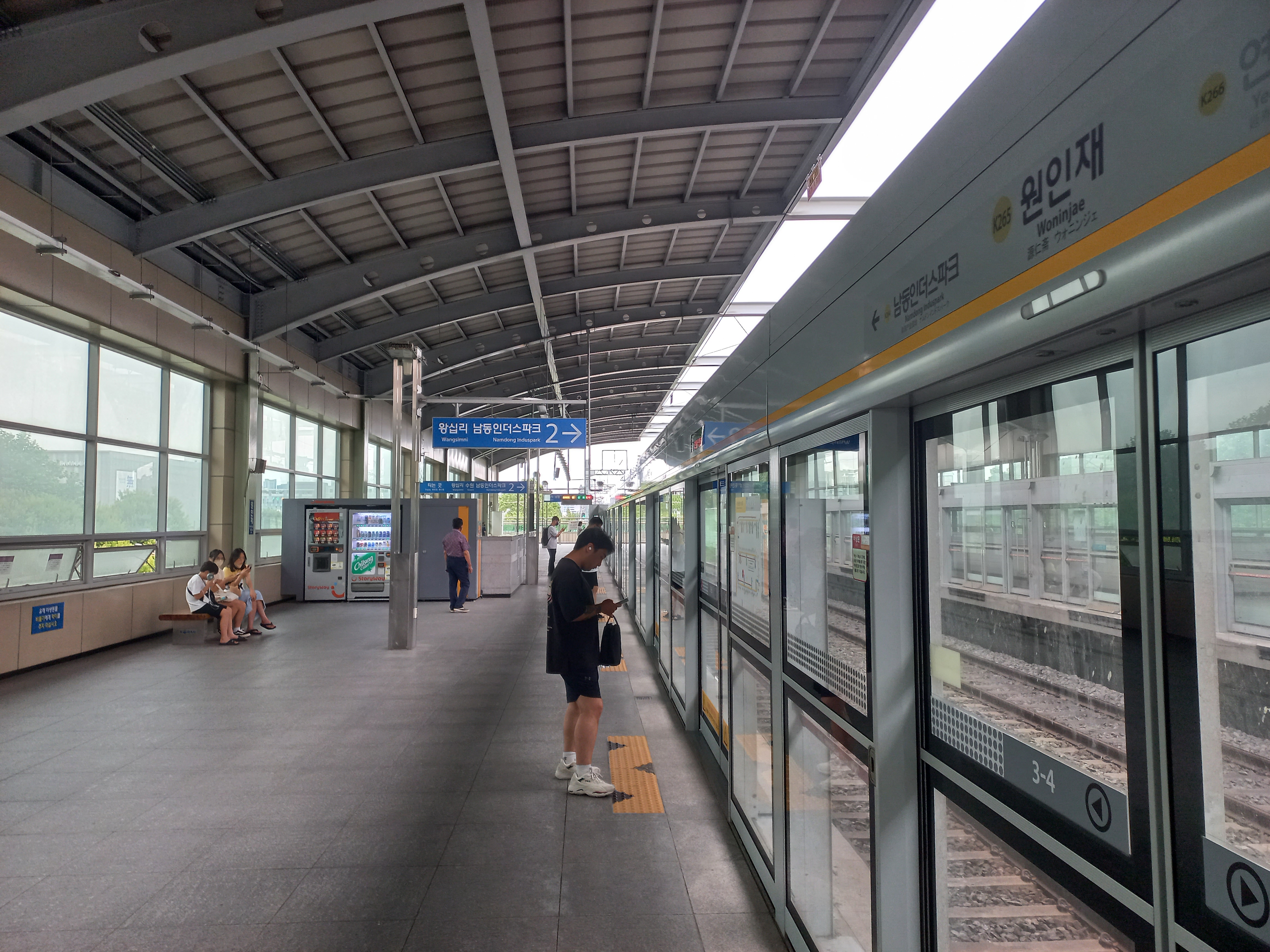
Platform (Suin-Bundang Line)
