= Hogupo station =

Metro station in Incheon, South Korea

호구포; Hogupo
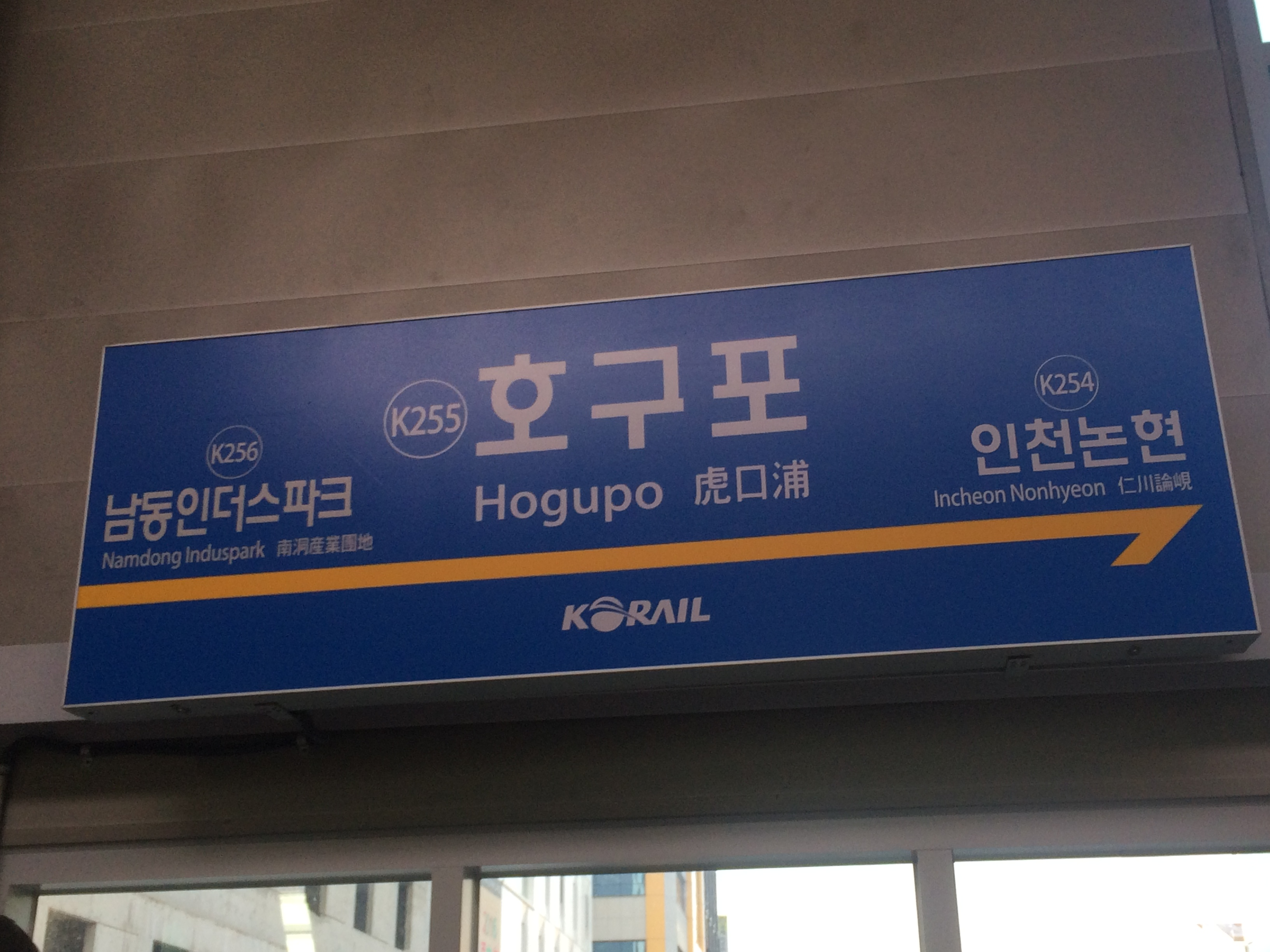

Korean name
- Hangul: 호구포역
- Hanja: 虎口浦驛
- Revised Romanization: Hogupo-yeok
- McCune–Reischauer: Hogup'o-yŏk

General information
- Location: Namdong-gu, Incheon
- Coordinates: 37.401622°N 126.708682°E
- Operator: Korail
- Line: Suin–Bundang Line
- Platforms: 2
- Tracks: 2

Construction
- Structure type: Aboveground

Key dates
- June 30, 2012: Suin–Bundang Line opened
Location

Hogupo Station (Korean: 호구포역) is a station on the Suin–Bundang Line as a part of the Seoul Metropolitan Subway system as of June 30, 2012. It is located in Nonhyeon-dong, Namdong District, Incheon.

It was an abandoned railway station as Nonhyeon Station. It opened in 1967 and closed in the 1970s.

Preceding station	Seoul Metropolitan Subway	Following station
Incheon Nonhyeon towards Cheongnyangni	Suin–Bundang Line	Namdong Induspark towards Incheon
