= Sari station (Ansan) =

Metro station in Ansan, South Korea

| 사리; Sari |
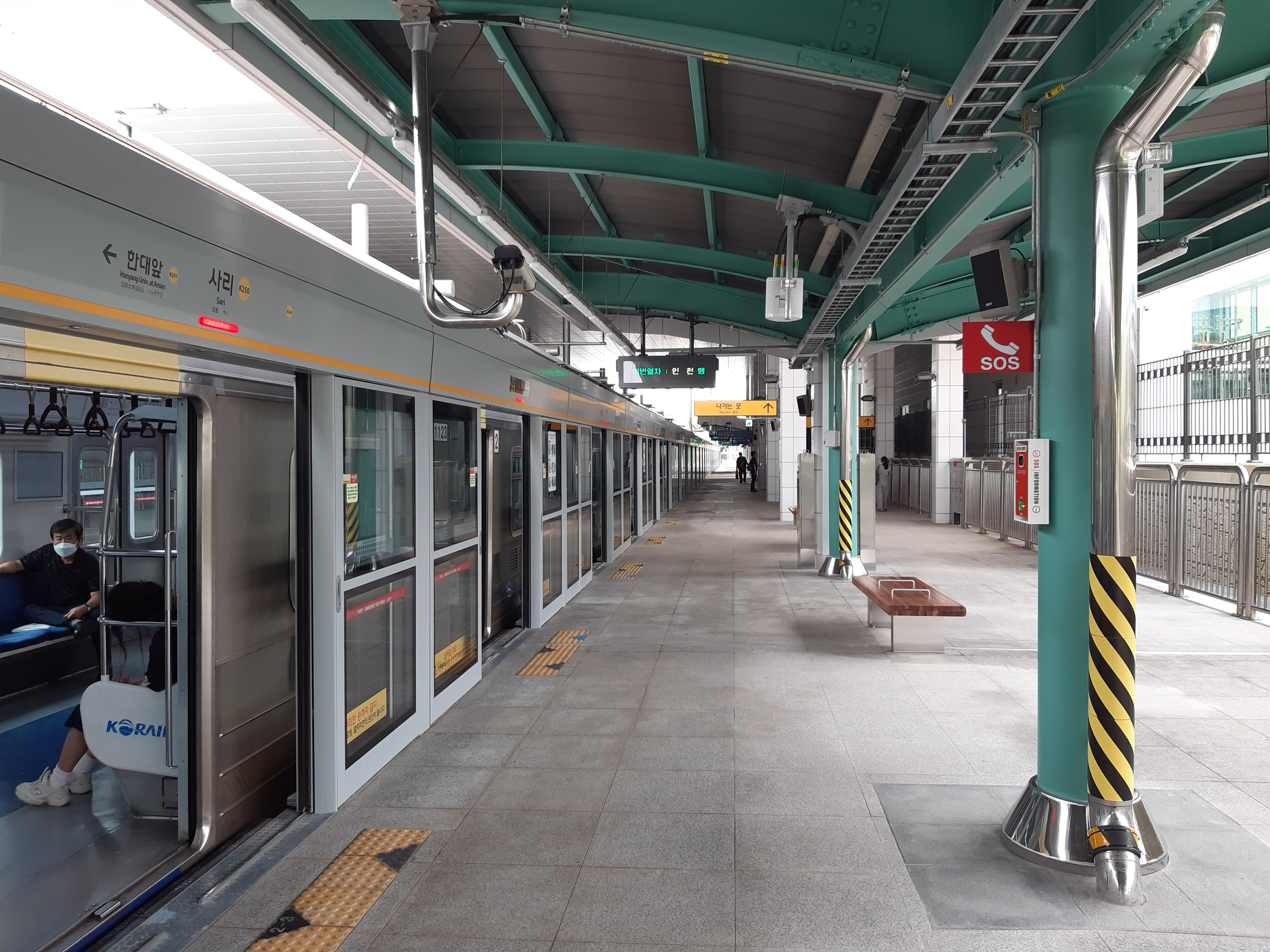

Korean name
- Hangul: 사리역
- Hanja: 四里驛
- RR: Sari-yeok
- MR: Sari-yŏk

General information
- Location: 93 Chungjangro, Sangnok-gu, Ansan, Gyeonggi-do
- Coordinates: 37.2909°N 126.8572°E
- Operator: Korail
- Line: Suin–Bundang Line
- Platforms: 2
- Tracks: 2

Construction
- Structure type: Aboveground

Key dates
- September 12, 2020: Suin–Bundang Line opened
Location

Sari station is a railroad station on the Suin–Bundang Line of the Seoul Metropolitan Subway in Ansan, Gyeonggi Province, South Korea. It opened on 12 September 2020.

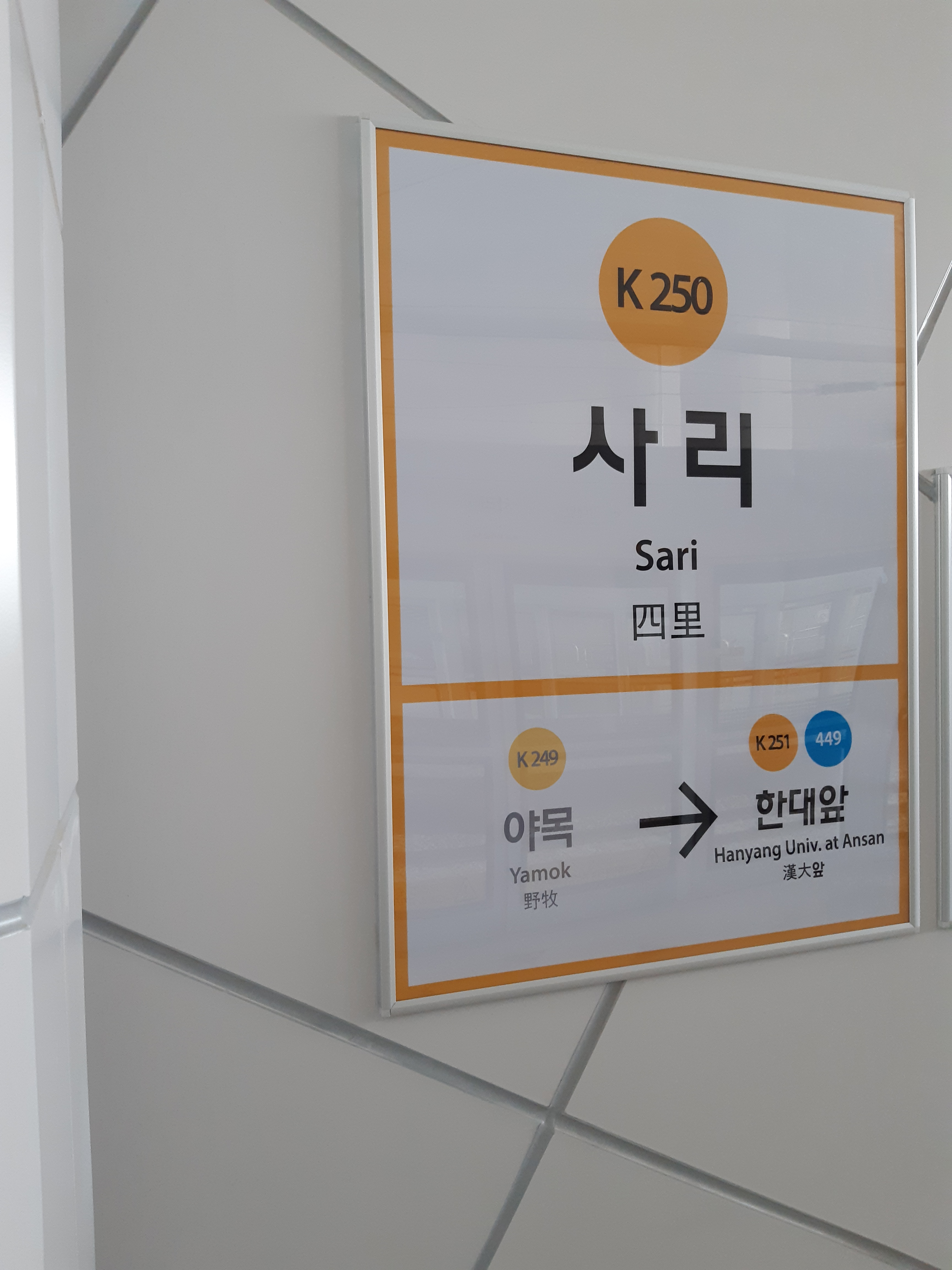

| Preceding station | Seoul Metropolitan Subway | Following station |
|---|---|---|
| Yamok towards Cheongnyangni | Suin–Bundang Line | Hanyang University at Ansan towards Incheon |
