= Incheon Nonhyeon station =

Metro station in Incheon, South Korea

인천논현; Incheon Nonhyeon
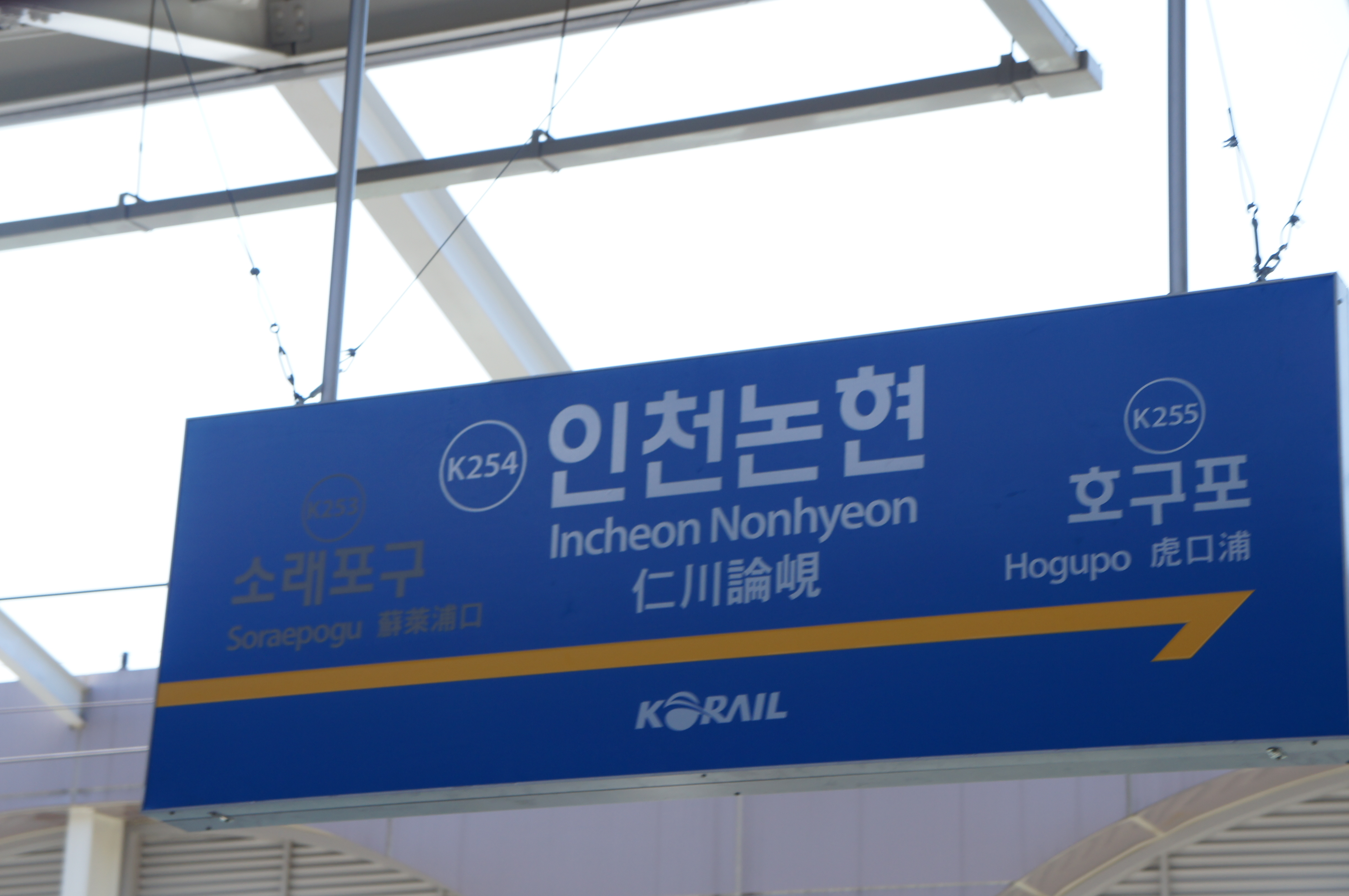

Korean name
- Hangul: 인천논현역
- Hanja: 仁川論峴驛
- Revised Romanization: Incheonnonhyeonnyeok
- McCune–Reischauer: Inch'ŏnnonhyŏnnyŏk

General information
- Location: Namdong-gu, Incheon
- Coordinates: 37.400641°N 126.722495°E
- Operator: Korail
- Line: Suin–Bundang Line
- Platforms: 2
- Tracks: 2

Construction
- Structure type: Aboveground

Key dates
- June 30, 2012: Suin–Bundang Line opened
Location

Incheon Nonhyeon Station is a railway station on the Suin–Bundang Line in Namdong District, Incheon, South Korea. It opened on 30 June 2012.

It was called "Nonhyeon Curtilage (Korean: 논현택지; Hanja: 論峴宅地; RR: Nonhyeontaekji; MR: Nonhyŏnt'aekchi) Station" tentatively, but Korail decided its official name "Incheon Nonhyeon Station" and announced it on 15 May 2012.

Preceding station	Seoul Metropolitan Subway	Following station
Soraepogu towards Cheongnyangni	Suin–Bundang Line	Hogupo towards Incheon
Soraepogu towards Oido	Suin–Bundang Line Suin Express Line	Woninjae towards Incheon
