= Jung District, Incheon =

Former district of Incheon, South Korea

Coordinates: 37°28′20″N 126°37′20″E

Jung
- Autonomous District
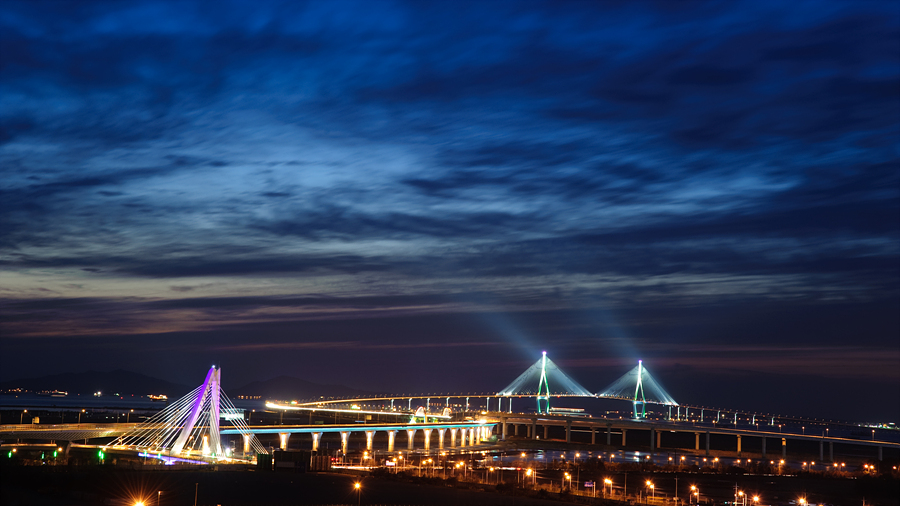

- Flag

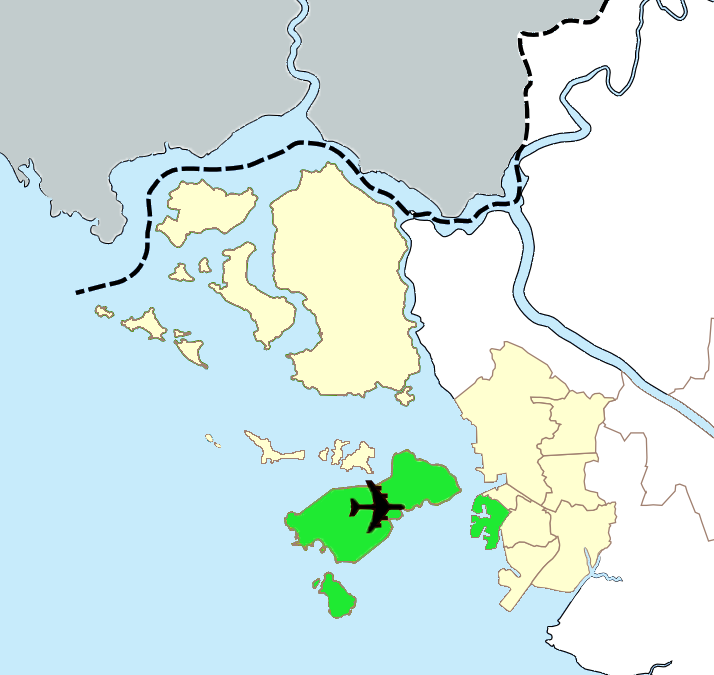
- Country: South Korea
- Region: Sudogwon
- Provincial level: Incheon
- Administrative divisions: 11 administrative dong

Area
  - Total: 134.29 km^{2} (51.85 sq mi)

Population (2020)
  - Total: 136,879
  - Density: 1,019.3/km^{2} (2,639.9/sq mi)
  - Dialect: Seoul
- Website: Jung District Office

Korean name
- Hangul: 중구
- Hanja: 中區
- RR: Jung-gu
- MR: Chung-gu

Jung District (Korean: 중구) is a former district of Incheon, South Korea. It was dissolved on July 1, 2026. Its former territory has been split into Jemulpo District and Yeongjong District.

The district was the historic central district of the city. Its name also means "central". It contains several historical and cultural heritage monuments, such as Dap-dong Cathedral, Hongyemun Gate, The First Anglican Church, and Jayu Park, Korea's first modern park. Incheon Chinatown, the birthplace of jajangmyeon, is located in the district.

Incheon is the gateway to Seoul, the capital of South Korea. In modern times it became a trading port, eventually growing to become the second-largest port in South Korea. Incheon International Airport is also located in Jung District.

== Administrative Divisions ==
Administrative divisions

=== Old downtown area ===
- Sinpo-dong (divided in turn into Jungang-dong 1 to 4 Ga, Haean-dong 1 to 4 Ga, Gwandong 1 to 3 Ga, Songhak-dong 1 to 3 Ga, Sadong, Sinsaeng-dong, Dapdong, Sinpo-dong, Hangdong 1 to 6 Ga and some portion of Hangdong 7-ga)
- Yeonan-dong (divided in turn into some portions of Hangdong 7-ga and Bukseong-dong 1-ga)
- Gaehang-dong
  - Bukseong-dong (divided in turn into Bukseong-dong 2 and 3 Ga, some portion of Bukseong-dong 1-ga and Seollin-dong)
  - Songwol-dong 1 to 3 Ga
- Sinheung-dong (divided in turn into Sinheung-dong 1 to 3 Ga and Seonhwa-dong)
- Yulmok-dong (divided in turn into Yulmok-dong and Yudong)
- Dong Incheon-dong (divided in turn into Nae-dong, Gyeong-dong, Yong-dong, Inhyeon-dong, and Jeon-dong)
- Dowon-dong

=== Yeongjong-Yongyu ===
- Yeongjong-dong, Yeongjong Island (divided in turn into Jungsan-dong, Unnam-dong and Unbuk-dong)
- Unseo-dong, Yeongjong Island
- Yongyu-dong, Yongyu Island (divided in turn into Eurwang-dong, Nambuk-dong, Deokgyo-dong and Muui-dong)

== Administrative reform ==
In 1989, Yeongjong-Yongyu was transferred to Jung District. Yeongjong-Yongyu suffered rapid population growth due to the development of Incheon International Airport but old downtown area of Incheon suffered rapid population decline. Therefore many residents Yeongjong-Yongyu demanded that Yeongjong-Yongyu should be a district of Incheon and old downtown area of Jung District, Incheon should be merged with Dong District, Incheon. In 2022, Yeongjong-Yongyu's Korean national population exceeded 100 thousands and old downtown area of Jung and Dong Districts.

On August 31, 2022. Yoo Jeong-bok who is a Mayor of Incheon officialized this proposal to a city policy. Old downtown area of Jung District and Dong District will be merged into Jemulpo District and Yeongjong-Yongyu will be an independent Yeongjong District. Two mayors of effected districts agreed this proposal.

== Education ==
International schools:

- Overseas Chinese Primary and Middle/High School, Incheon (인천화교소·중산중고등학교)

== Tourist attractions ==
- Incheon Chinatown is the birthplace of jajangmyeon. Jajangmyeon Museum is a museum about the dish.
- There are many modern buildings in Gaehangjang Street. Incheon Art Platform is an art space established in 2009. It reuses buildings built during the open port period and 1930s. Incheon Open Port Museum displays relics related to modern culture that was introduced to or occurred in Incheon. It reuses the former building of Japanese First Bank built in 1899. Daebul Hotel is the first Western hotel in Korea.
- Jayu Park is the first Western-style park of Korea.
- Songwol-dong Fairy Tale Village has various murals and sculptures related to fairy tales.
