= Incheon Chinatown =

Ethnic enclave in Incheon, South Korea

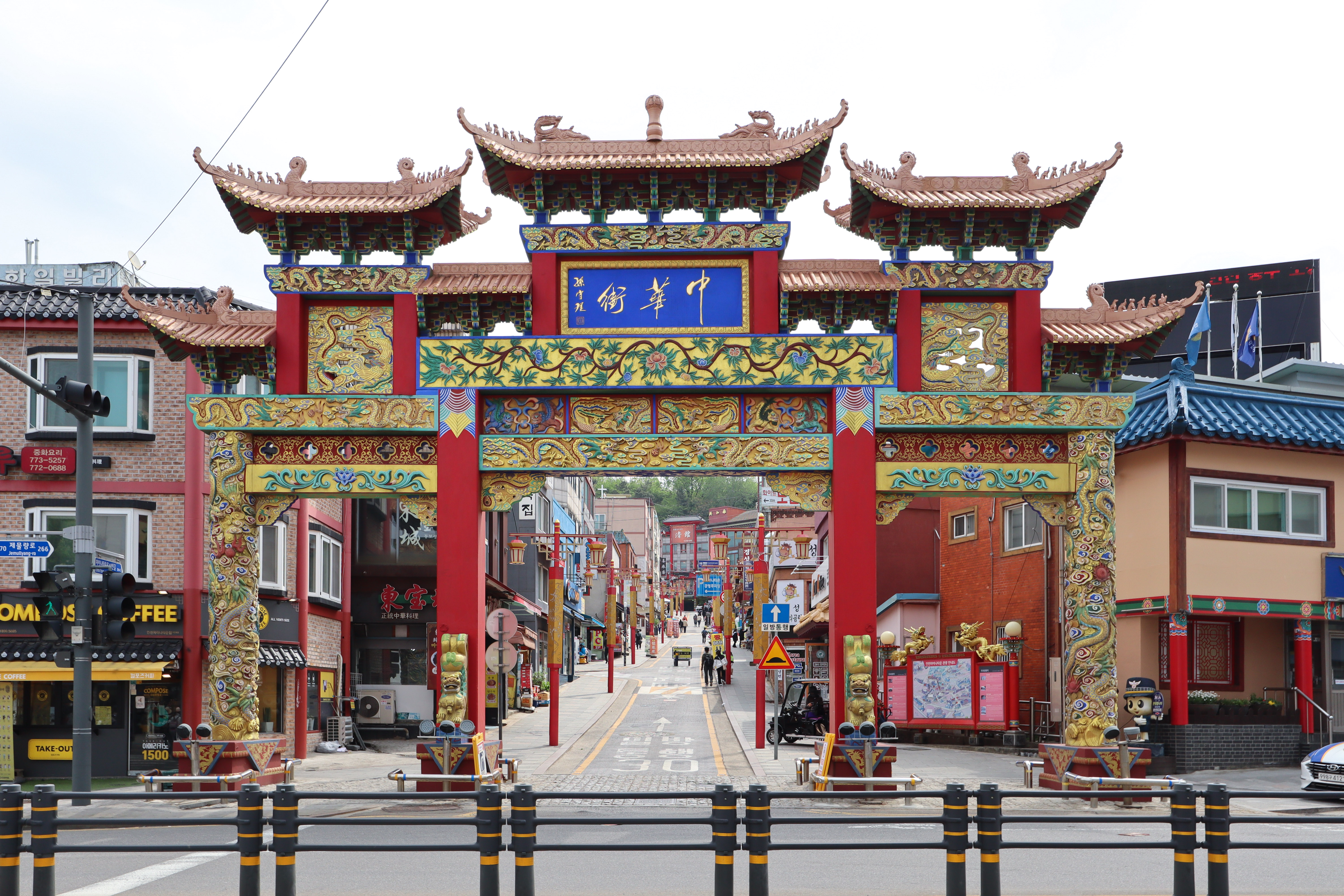
- Interactive map of Incheon Chinatown
- Coordinates: 37.4763°N 126.6181°E
- Country: South Korea
- City: Incheon
- District: Jung
- First Chinese settlers: 1884
- Website: www.ichinatown.or.kr

Incheon Chinatown (Korean: 인천차이나타운; Chinese: 仁川唐人街) is a Chinatown in Jung District, Incheon, South Korea. It is the only official Chinatown on the Korean peninsula, and one of the earliest, having formed in 1884. There are a number of restaurants and tourist attractions in the area. It features an 11-meter high Chinese-style gateway, or paifang.

The area is located nearby other attractions such as Jayu Park and Wolmido. There are also Japan-related attractions nearby.

== History ==
The history of Incheon Chinatown is over 100 years old. While not all traditional culture of the first generation has been preserved, the area still harbors many of the flavors of China.

Incheon became a China-friendly city after the modern opening of late 1800s. Korea started modern trade by signing the China–Korea Treaty of 1882. Incheon's Chinatown area came into being with the opening of the Incheon Port in 1883 and Incheon's designation as an extraterritoriality of the Qing dynasty. After this, 'Incheon Chinese Society' (華僑) begun in earnest following the establishment of the Chinese concession of Incheon in today's Incheon in 1884. An 1883 report indicated that 63 Chinese people lived there. And they increased to 235 people in one year. In 1892, they increased to 637 people, and they increased to about 1000 people in early 1900. Overseas Chinese who currently live in Incheon in 2015 number 50,000 people. 'Incheon Chinatown' improved the relationship of Korea and China. Incheon Chinatown street name will change to China's well-known street or city names in 2016. Today, the Chinese residents of Chinatown are mostly 2nd or 3rd generation descendents of the early Chinese settlers.

== Attractions ==
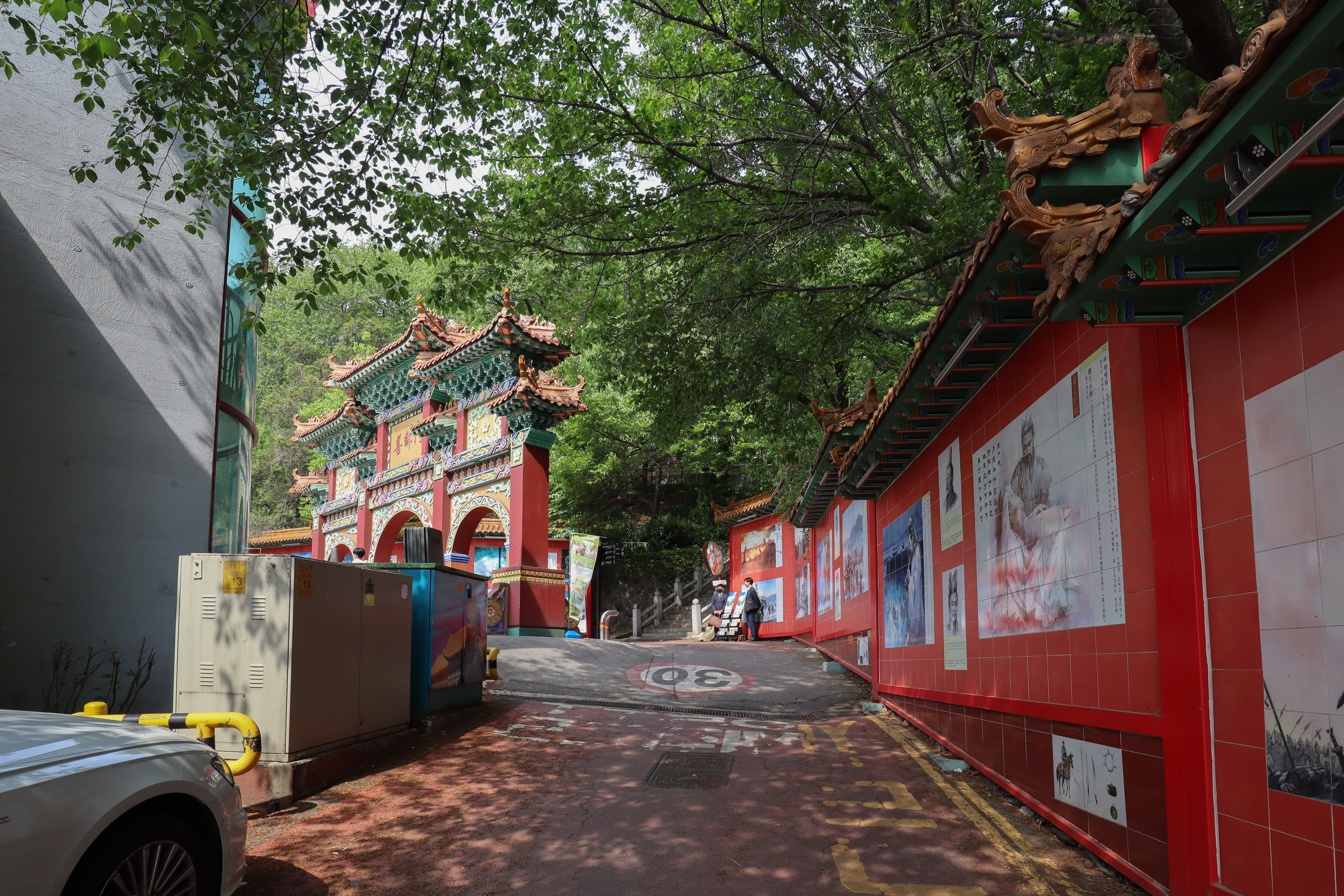
A street in the area (2023)

Restaurants in the area serve both more authentic Chinese food, as well as Korean Chinese food. Examples of Korean Chinese food include tangsuyuk and jajangmyeon.

The Jajangmyeon Museum is located in the enclave; it is the former site of the historic c. 1905 – 1983 Chinese restaurant Gonghwachun, which is considered the first restaurant to serve jajangmyeon in Korea. There is another restaurant that opened under the name "Gonghwachun" in 2004 that claims to continue the legacy of the original, but this claim has been disputed by the original restaurant's founding family.

Stores sell China-related goods, such as qipao, Chinese ceramics, Chinese tea, as well as various jewelry and accessories.

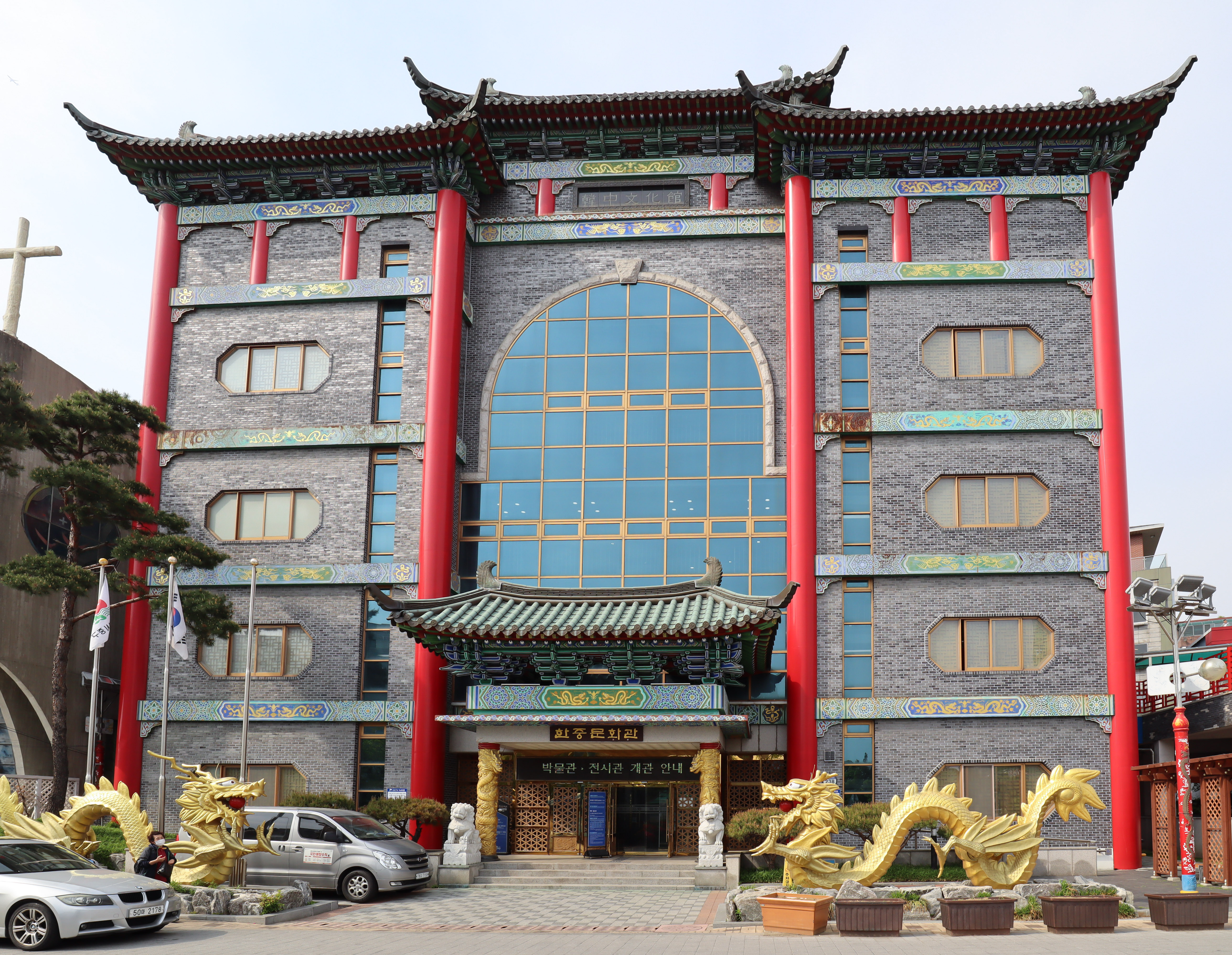
The Korea–China Cultural Center (2023)

Incheon Chinatown has many attractions such the Chinese-style temple Uiseondang (의선당; 義善堂). It also has a street of murals depicting the history of Three Kingdoms. The Korea–China Cultural Center was built in 2005. There is also a Chinese school that was constructed in 1934.
