= Freedom Park =

Freedom Park may refer to:

== In the United States ==
- Freedom Park (Arlington, Virginia), a two block long elevated linear park
- Freedom Park (Atlanta, Georgia), a large city park
- Freedom Park (Charlotte, North Carolina), a large city park
- Freedom Park (Omaha, Nebraska), an outdoor park and museum at the Greater Omaha Marina
- Nu Stadium, a soccer stadium in Miami, opened in 2026, initially named Miami Freedom Park, after a newly built park adjacent to it.
- North Carolina Freedom Park in Raleigh, North Carolina

== In Asia ==
- Freedom Park (Cambodia), a 1.2-hectare plaza in Phnom Penh
- Freedom Park, Bangalore, the former the Central Jail
- Jayu Park, also known as Freedom Park, a park in Incheon, South Korea

== In Africa ==
- Freedom Park (Lagos), a memorial and leisure park area in the middle of downtown Lagos
- Freedom Park (South Africa), a war memorial in Pretoria
- Freedom Park, North West, an informal housing settlement near the town of Rustenburg

You may be also looking for:

- Freedom park
