= Jemulpo District =

District of Incheon, South Korea

Coordinates: 37°28′31″N 126°37′58″E

Jemulpo
- Autonomous District
- Incheon Open Port Street, Gwan-dong 1-ga

- Flag
- Interactive map of Jemulpo
- Country: South Korea
- Region: Sudogwon
- Provincial level: Incheon
- Administrative divisions: 18 administrative dong

Area
  - Total: 21.7 km^{2} (8.4 sq mi)

Population (2022)
  - Total: 102,000
  - Density: 4,700/km^{2} (12,200/sq mi)
  - Dialect: Seoul

Korean name
- Hangul: 제물포구
- Hanja: 濟物浦區
- RR: Jemulpo-gu
- MR: Chemulp'o-gu

Jemulpo District (Korean: 제물포구) is a district of Incheon, South Korea. It was established on July 1, 2026, and consists of parts of the former districts Jung and Dong.

The district comprises the city's historic center. Jemulpo was founded in 1883 on the opening of the Jemulpo Port and contains several historical and cultural heritage monuments, such as Dap-dong Cathedral, Hongyemun Gate, The First Anglican Church, and Jayu Park, Korea's first modern park.

== History ==
In modern times Jemulpo became a trading port, eventually growing to become the second-largest port in South Korea. In 1968, Incheon was divided to four districts including Dong and Jung Districts. In 1989, Yeongjong-Yongyu was transferred to Jung District. Yeongjong-Yongyu suffered rapid population growth due to the development of Incheon International Airport but old downtown area of Incheon suffered rapid population decline. Therefore, many residents Yeongjong-Yongyu demanded that Yeongjong-Yongyu should be a district of Incheon and old downtown area of Jung District, Incheon should be merged with Dong District, Incheon. In 2022, Yeongjong-Yongyu's Korean national population exceeded 100 thousands and old downtown area of Jung and Dong Districts.

On August 31, 2022. Yoo Jeong-bok who is a Mayor of Incheon officialized this proposal to a city policy. Old downtown area of Jung District and Dong District will be merged into Jemulpo District and Yeongjong-Yongyu will be an independent Yeongjong District. Two mayors of effected districts agreed this proposal.

The district was officially created on July 1, 2026. It consists of the former Dong District and part of Jung District.

== Administrative Divisions ==
=== Former Jung District ===
- Sinpo-dong (divided in turn into Jungang-dong 1 to 4 Ga, Haean-dong 1 to 4 Ga, Gwandong 1 to 3 Ga, Songhak-dong 1 to 3 Ga, Sadong, Sinsaeng-dong, Dapdong, Sinpo-dong, Hangdong 1 to 6 Ga and some portion of Hangdong 7-ga)
- Yeonan-dong (divided in turn into some portions of Hangdong 7-ga and Bukseong-dong 1-ga)
- Gaehang-dong
  - Bukseong-dong (divided in turn into Bukseong-dong 2 and 3 Ga, some portion of Bukseong-dong 1-ga and Seollin-dong)
  - Songwol-dong 1 to 3 Ga
- Sinheung-dong (divided in turn into Sinheung-dong 1 to 3 Ga and Seonhwa-dong)
- Yulmok-dong (divided in turn into Yulmok-dong and Yudong)
- Dong Incheon-dong (divided in turn into Nae-dong, Gyeong-dong, Yong-dong, Inhyeon-dong, and Jeon-dong)
- Dowon-dong

=== Former Dong District ===
- Manseok-dong
- Hwasu 1-Hwapyeong Dong
- Hwasu 2-dong
- Songhyeon 1 to 3 Dong
- Songnim 1 to 6 Dong
- Geumchang-dong (combination of Geumgok-dong and Changyeong-dong)

== Education ==
International schools:

- Overseas Chinese Primary and Middle/High School, Incheon (인천화교소·중산중고등학교)

University:

- JEI University

== Tourist attractions ==
Jajangmyeon Museum is a museum about Jajangmyeon noodle.

== Incident ==
- 1999 Incheon Beer Hope Fire
