= Banappa Park =

Public park in India

Coordinates: 12.968152°N 77.586743°E

Banappa Park is a public park in Bangalore that has been used by various popular movements right from the days of Freedom Struggle or Indian independence movement. On average at least two rallies, attended by hundreds of people, are held every week at Banappa Park, off Hudson Circle. Many Leaders including Mahatma Gandhi have given inspiring talks and awareness speeches here in this park.

== Current status ==
Banappa Park along with Freedom Park, Bangalore is being used for social movements and arisings against the many delinquency. The park now houses a Spinning wheel symbolizing Gandhi's Ideals, which is the place where Gandhi hosted many speeches. Just next to the park is a basketball court of an elite divisional team Devanga Union.
