= Sinpo station =

Metro station in Incheon, South Korea

Coordinates: 37.4688°N 126.6240°E

신포; Sinpo
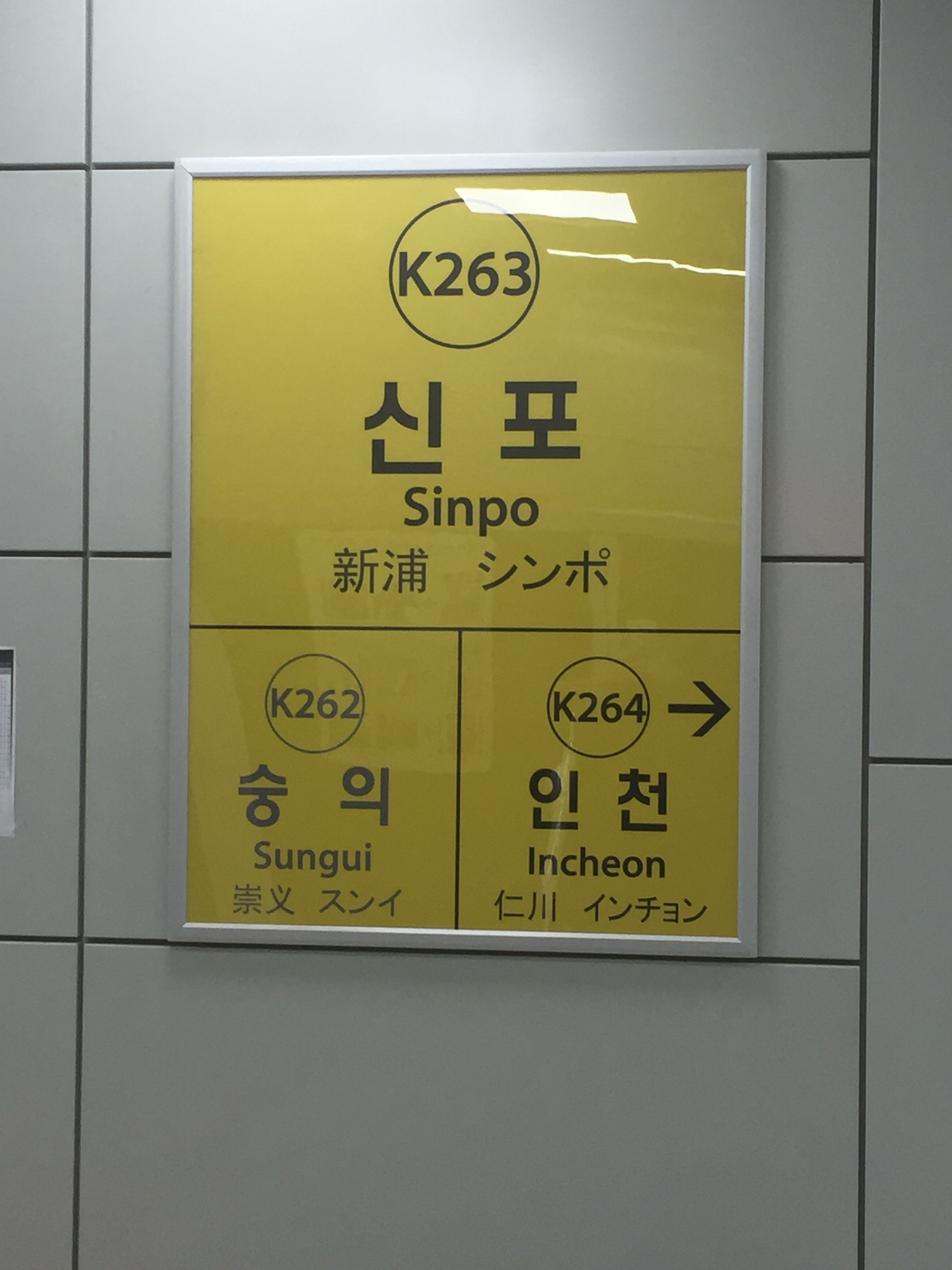

Korean name
- Hangul: 신포역
- Hanja: 新浦驛
- Revised Romanization: Sinpo-yeok
- McCune–Reischauer: Sinp'o-yŏk

General information
- Location: Hang-dong, Jemulpo-gu, Incheon
- Operator: Korail
- Line: Suin–Bundang Line
- Platforms: 2
- Tracks: 2

Construction
- Structure type: Underground

Key dates
- February 27, 2016: Suin–Bundang Line opened
Location

Sinpo Station is a metro station on the Suin–Bundang Line of the Seoul Metropolitan Subway system that opened on February 27, 2016. It is located in Hang-dong, Jemulpo-gu, Incheon.

Preceding station	Seoul Metropolitan Subway	Following station
Sungui towards Cheongnyangni	Suin–Bundang Line	Incheon Terminus
