= Gonghwachun =

C. 1905–1983 Chinese restaurant in Incheon, South Korea

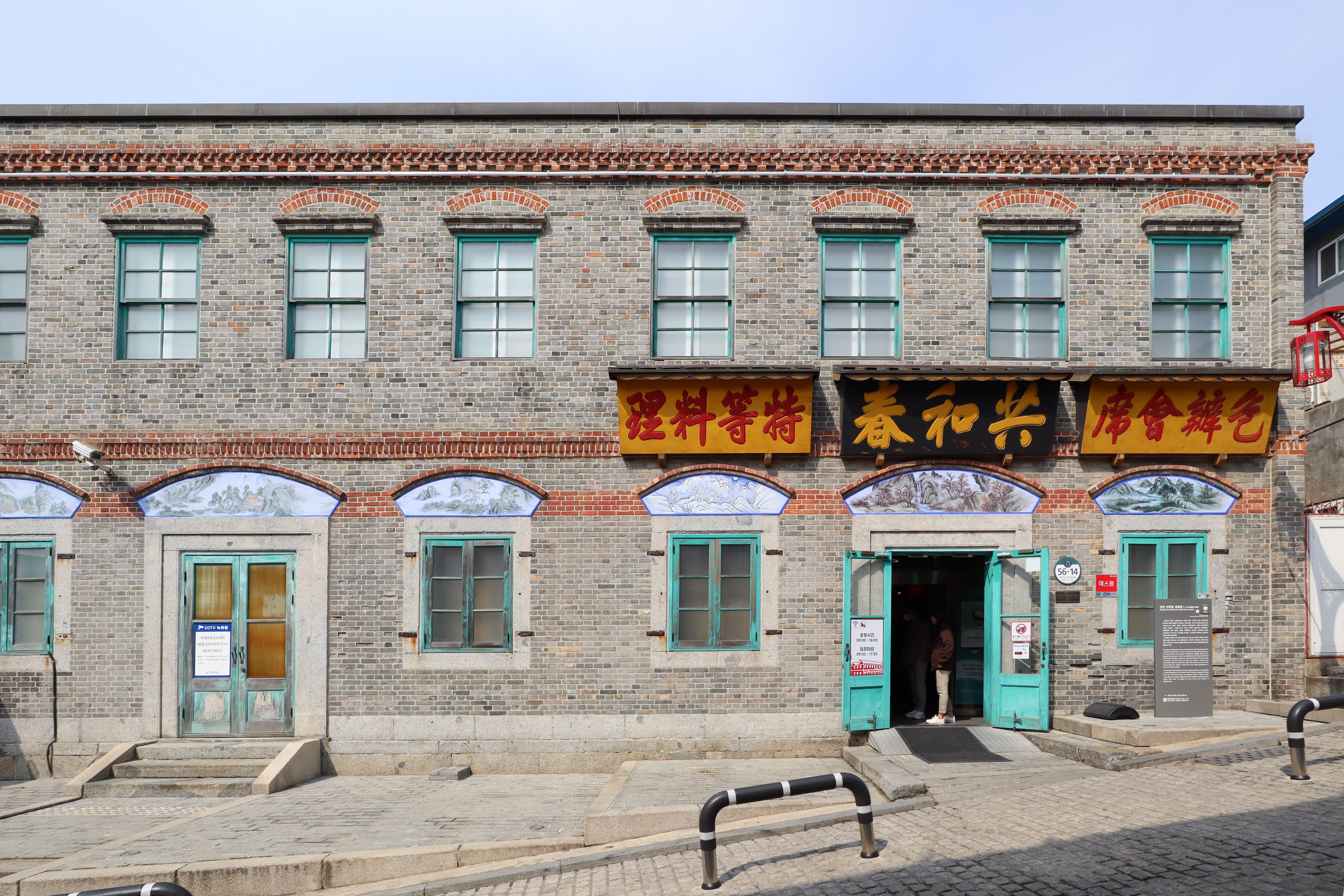
- The former building of the restaurant, now the Jajangmyeon Museum (2023)
- Interactive map of Gonghwachun

Restaurant information
- Established: Between 1905 and 1908
- Closed: 1983
- Location: Incheon, South Korea
- Coordinates: 37.47490°N 126.61821°E

Gonghwachun

Chinese name
- Chinese: 共和春
- Literal meaning: spring of the republic
Transcriptions
Standard Mandarin
- Hanyu Pinyin: gònghéchūn

Korean name
- Hangul: 공화춘
Transcriptions
- Revised Romanization: Gonghwachun
- McCune–Reischauer: Konghwach'un

Gonghwachun (Korean: 공화춘; Hanja: 共和春) was a historic restaurant specializing in Korean Chinese cuisine in Incheon Chinatown, South Korea. It first opened some time between 1905 and 1908, and is considered the first restaurant to serve the dish jajangmyeon in Korea. It closed in 1983. Its original building was made a Registered Cultural Heritage of South Korea in 2006. In 2012, a Jajangmyeon Museum was established in the building.

There is a modern South Korean restaurant franchise under the same name that was created in 2004 that claims descendency from the original. Its authenticity is disputed by descendents of the founders of the original restaurant. Some descendants of the founders operate a nearby restaurant called Sinseung Banjeom.

== History ==
Chinese settlers arrived in Incheon following Chinese soldiers sent to quell the 1882 Imo Incident.

The restaurant's precise founding date is uncertain. It was founded in either 1905, 1907, or 1908 by Yu Xiguang (Chinese: 于希光; Korean: 우희광; MR: U Hŭigwang; 1886–1949), a Chinese person who came to Incheon from Shandong, China. The restaurant was originally founded under the name Shāndōng Huìguǎn (Chinese: 山東會館; Korean: 산동회관; MR: Sandonghoegwan). It served as both a restaurant and inn for primarily Chinese customers. In either 1912 or 1913, in honor of the establishment of the Republic of China, the restaurant changed its name to Gonghwachun (lit. 'spring of the republic'). During the 1910–1945 Japanese colonial period in Korea, the restaurant became seen as a premiere destination for Chinese food in Korea.

The Chinese dish zhajiangmian, which was popular in Shandong, was served in the restaurant. The zhajiangmian served in the restaurant was originally a brown color. At some point, caramel was added to the tianmian sauce (chunjang in Korean), which made it a black color.

According to the recollection of a great-grandson of Yu, the restaurant had a waiting area on the first floor. On the second was a dining/event hall, kitchen, and accommodations for workers. It had around 10 staff members. There were square and round tables. By the 1960s to 1970s, the restaurant regularly held weddings and other events. It was reportedly also popular with Taiwanese marines that docked at Incheon. First Lady of South Korea Yuk Young-soo, wife of Park Chung Hee, was reportedly a fan of the restaurant. Yu died in 1949, and his eldest son Yu Hongzhang (Chinese: 于鴻章; Korean: 우홍장; 1917–1993) took over the restaurant. Hongzhang purchased a building adjacent to the restaurant and merged the buildings to increase the restaurant's size. He reportedly became seen as a leader among the Chinese community in Incheon by the 1970s.

By the 1980s, Gonghwachun entered a decline. This was due to a number of reasons: Koreans began establishing their own Chinese restaurants in greater numbers and the South Korean government had restrictions on foreigners conducting business in Korea. In 1983, Gonghwachun was closed, and Yu Hongzhang and most of his family moved to Taiwan. Yu's eldest son, Yu Xinchen (Chinese: 于心辰; Korean: 우심진; 1940–2003) was reportedly the only member of the family to stay in Korea. He ran the restaurant Junghwalu (Chinese: 中華楼; pinyin: Zhōnghuálóu; Korean: 중화루).

On April 14, 2006, the building was made Registered Cultural Heritage of South Korea No. 246. That year, work began to convert the building into a museum. On April 28, 2012, the Jajangmyeon Museum was opened in the former building of the restaurant.

== Modern restaurant ==
After the restaurant closed, a Chinese person purchased the rights to the restaurant. Those rights were again sold to a Chinese person named Yi Hyeon-dae (이현대), who registered it as a trademark in 2002, and in 2004 started a new restaurant that claimed to be a successor to the original. The restaurant is four stories tall and near the original location. The rights were then purchased by the CJ Group, which then transferred rights to GS25. They claimed that the chain was descended from the original Gonghwachun restaurant. In 2019, the founder of the restaurant's granddaughter filed a lawsuit against the CEO of the chain, for a symbolically trivial value of ₩1,000 ($0.86). The plaintiff argued that the chain had nothing to do with the original restaurant, and was misrepresenting its background. The chain has since expanded to other cities in South Korea, and sells instant ramen that is now sold internationally.

Wang Ae-joo, granddaughter of the original restaurant's founder, has a small Chinese restaurant near the original called Sinseung Banjeom (신승반점).

== See also ==
- Jin A Chun – oldest Korean Chinese restaurant in Seoul
