= Sungui station =

Metro station in Incheon, South Korea

Coordinates: 37.4608°N 126.6383°E

숭의 (인하대병원); Sungui (Inha Univ. Hospital)
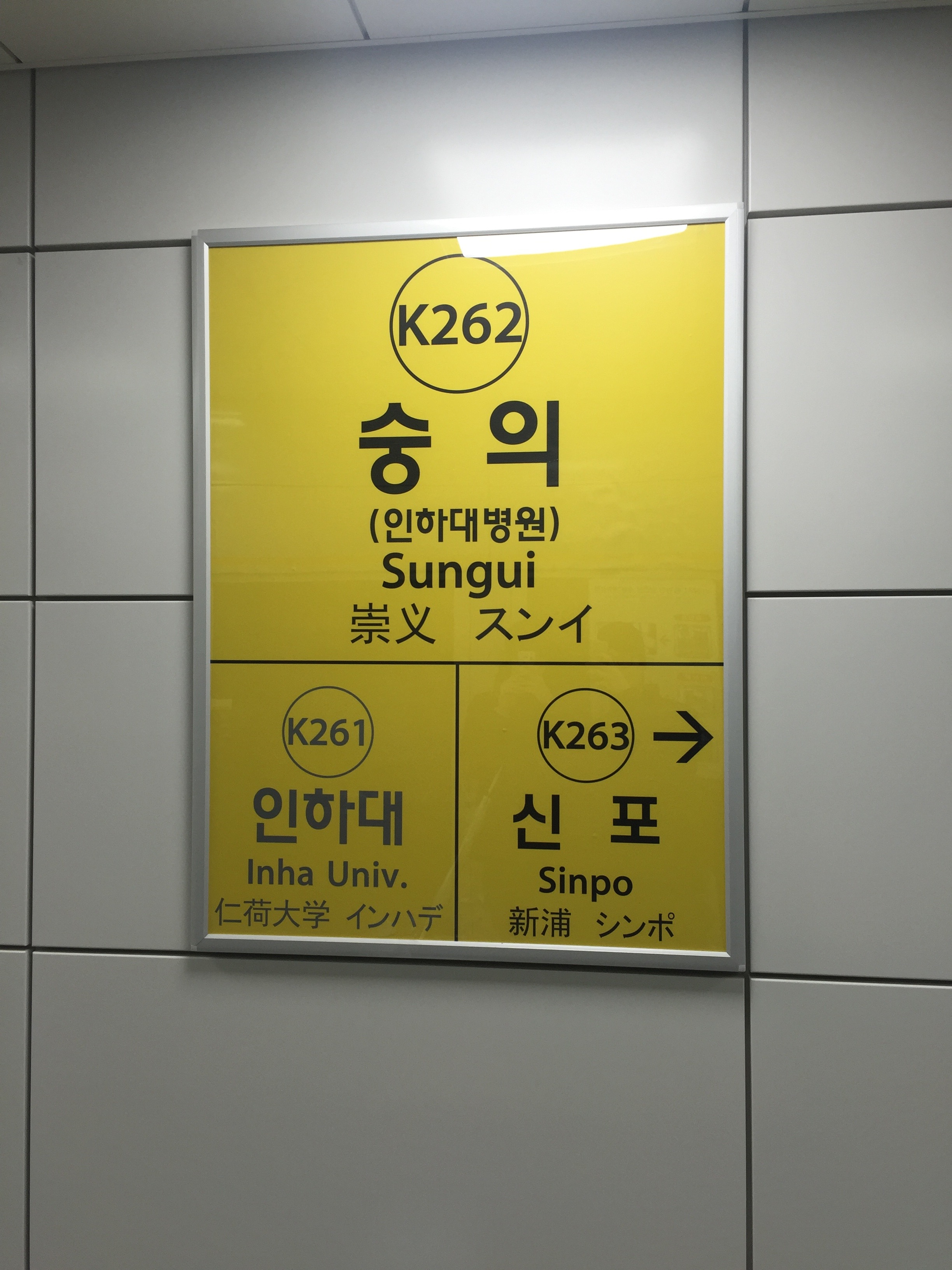

Korean name
- Hangul: 숭의역
- Hanja: 崇義驛
- Revised Romanization: Sungui-yeok
- McCune–Reischauer: Sungui-yŏk

General information
- Location: Incheon
- Operator: Korail
- Line: Suin–Bundang Line
- Platforms: 2
- Tracks: 2

Construction
- Structure type: Underground

Key dates
- February 27, 2016: Suin–Bundang Line opened
Location

Sungui Station is a metro station on the Suin–Bundang Line of the Seoul Metropolitan Subway system that opened on February 27, 2016. It is located in Sinheung-dong, Jemulpo-gu, Incheon.

Its site was originally an abandoned railway station known as Namincheon Station back then which opened in 1937 and closed in the 1970s.

Preceding station	Seoul Metropolitan Subway	Following station
Inha University towards Cheongnyangni	Suin–Bundang Line	Sinpo towards Incheon
