= Jinachun =

Second oldest restaurant in Seoul, South Korea

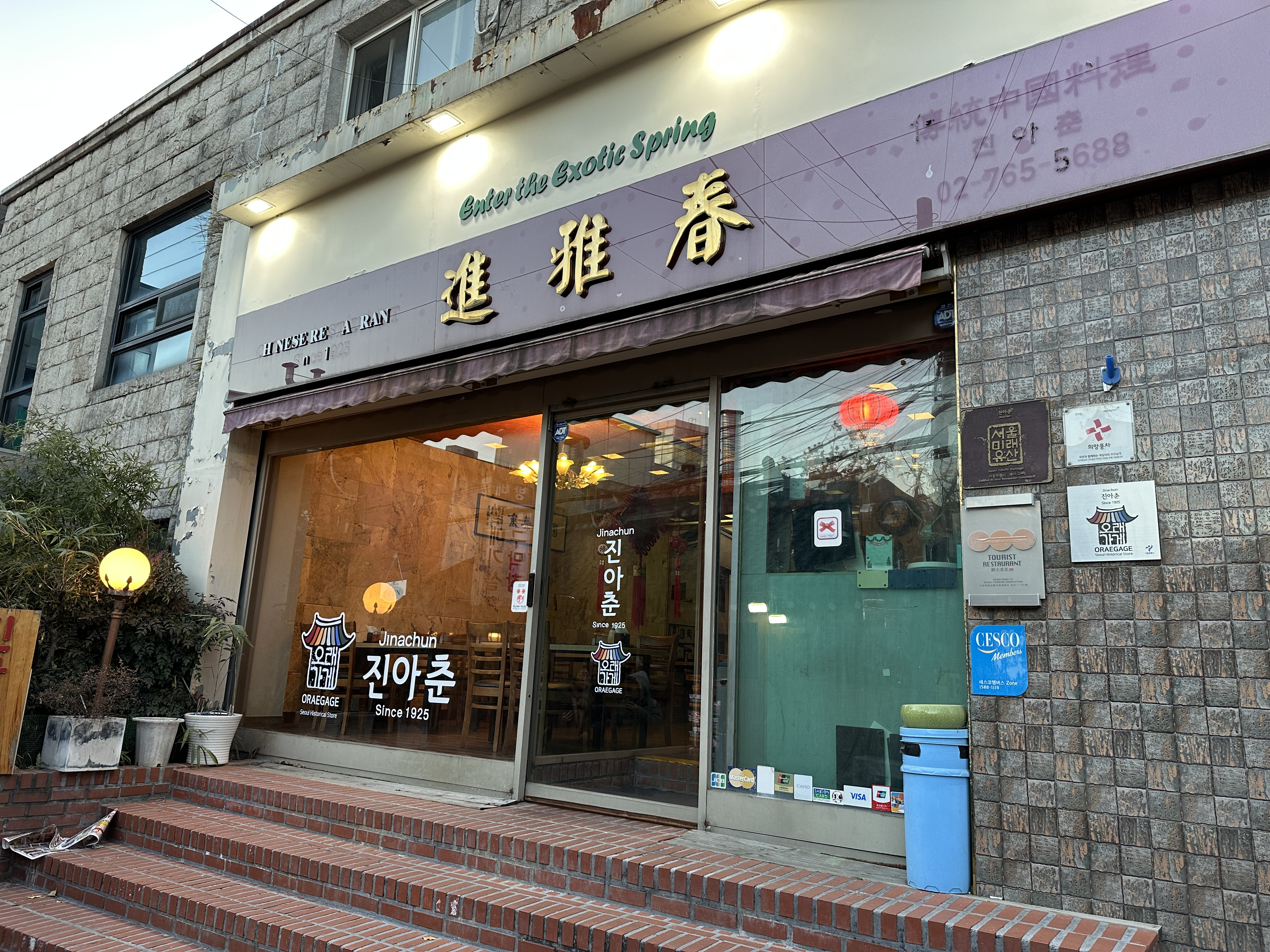
- The restaurant (2025)

Restaurant information
- Established: 1925; 100 years ago
- Food type: Korean Chinese cuisine
- Location: 18 Daemyeong 1-gil, Jongno District, Seoul, South Korea
- Coordinates: 37.5828°N 127.0004°E

Jinachun (Korean: 진아춘; Hanja: 進雅春; lit. arrival of a beautiful spring) is a historic Korean Chinese cuisine restaurant in Jongno District, Seoul, South Korea. It is recognized by the Seoul Metropolitan Government as the second oldest operating restaurant in Seoul, having been founded in 1925.

== History ==
The restaurant was founded in 1925 in the Daehangno area by an ethnic Chinese immigrant surnamed Lee (이진산; Chinese name not given) from Shandong, China. The restaurant was reportedly successful and survived both the Japanese colonial period and the Korean War. It had a number of famous regular customers, including later South Korean prime minister Chang Myon, who ate at the restaurant while working as the principal of Dongsung High School. The restaurant was located near the old campus of Seoul National University, so many of its students and professors reportedly visited.

Lee had just one daughter from his two marriages. He ended up adopting one of his employees, surnamed Song (송협국; Chinese name not given). Upon Lee's death in the late 1970s, Song took over the business. Song had two sons and a daughter. His daughter emigrated to Taiwan and his sons to the United States. Song himself emigrated to the United States, and handed the business off to his nephew, surnamed Hyeong (형원호; Chinese name not given). Song's eldest son returned to South Korea in January 1993, and took control over the business. The restaurant's sales declined, and it eventually closed. Song changed the business to a Hamhung naengmyeon restaurant in 1995. Hyeong and his wife founded another business called Junghwa (중화) in February 2000 in the Gwanghwamun area. The restaurant quickly proved a success; this motivated Hyeong to reopen Jinachun.

Jinachun reopened again in the Daehangno area, albeit in a different location, and was run by Hyeong's younger sister and her husband. The restaurant moved locations in October 2010. The restaurant is reportedly known for its oyster jjamppong, jajangmyeon, and hand-made fried mandu.

== See also ==
- Gonghwachun – the first jajangmyeon restaurant in Korea
- Jajangmyeon Museum – museum about jajangmyeon in the former Gonghwachun building
