= Inha University station =

Metro station in Incheon, South Korea

Coordinates: 37.4485°N 126.6496°E

인하대; Inha Univ.
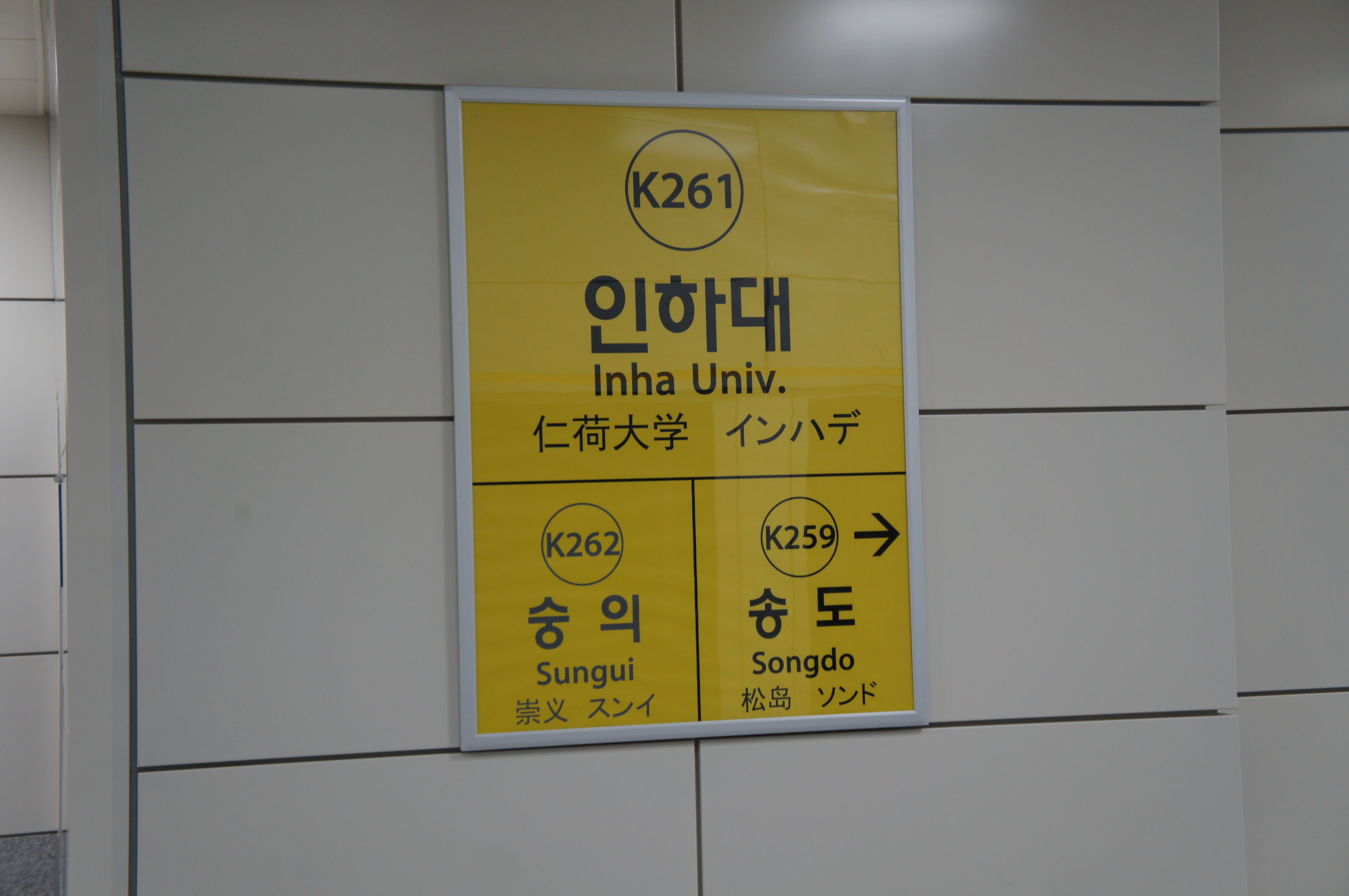

Korean name
- Hangul: 인하대역
- Hanja: 仁荷大驛
- Revised Romanization: Inhadae-yeok
- McCune–Reischauer: Inhadae-yŏk

General information
- Location: Michuhol District, Incheon
- Operator: Korail
- Line: Suin–Bundang Line
- Platforms: 2
- Tracks: 2

Construction
- Structure type: Underground

Key dates
- February 27, 2016: Suin–Bundang Line opened
Location

Inha University Station is a metro station on the Suin–Bundang Line as part of the Seoul Metropolitan Subway that opened on February 27, 2016. It is right next to Inha University and a large Home Plus mall, along with new large apartment complexes.

It was an abandoned railway station as Yonghyeon Station. It opened in 1965 and closed in the 1970s.

Preceding station	Seoul Metropolitan Subway	Following station
Songdo towards Cheongnyangni	Suin–Bundang Line	Sungui towards Incheon
Yeonsu towards Oido	Suin–Bundang Line Suin Express Line	Incheon Terminus
