= Bukseong-dong =

- Neighborhood
- Interactive map of Bukseong-dong
- Country: South Korea
- Region: Sudogwon
- Provincial level: Incheon

Area
  - Total: 3.02 km^{2} (1.17 sq mi)

Population (December 31, 2016)
  - Total: 3,374
  - Density: 1,120/km^{2} (2,890/sq mi)
  - Dialect: Seoul

Korean name
- Hangul: 북성동
- Hanja: 北城洞
- RR: Bukseong-dong
- MR: Puksŏng-dong

Bukseong-dong (Korean: 북성동) is a dong (neighborhood) in the Jung District of Incheon, South Korea.

== History ==
An area known as Bukseongpo because of fishing boats since ancient times has been named Bukseong-dong when the name was revised in 1946. It was called Hwabangjeong during the Japanese colonial period, and it was derived from the name of the first Japanese ambassador to Korea Hanabusa Yoshitada, who played a leading role in opening Incheon.

Seonlin-dong belongs to the smallest dong of the courtrooms, which are known as the boundary of Cheongguk, aka Cheonggwan area. Japanese people called Ginajeong (미) or Misengjeong (彌 生 町). In May 1977, the districts of Beopseong-dong and Seonlin-dong in Beopjeong-dong were designated as administrative districts of Bukseong-dong, and are operating.

== Tourist attractions ==
Jajangmyeon Museum is a museum about Jajangmyeon noodle.
