= Yeongjong District =

District of Incheon, South Korea

Yeongjong
- Autonomous District
- Flag
- Interactive map of Yeongjong
- Country: South Korea
- Region: Sudogwon
- Provincial level: Incheon
- Administrative divisions: 6 administrative dong

Area
  - Total: 125.8 km^{2} (48.6 sq mi)

Population (2026)
  - Total: 136,700
  - Dialect: Seoul
- Website: yeongjong.go.kr

Korean name
- Hangul: 영종구
- Hanja: 永宗區
- RR: Yeongjong-gu
- MR: Yŏngjong-gu

Yeongjong District (Korean: 영종구) is a district of Incheon, South Korea. It was established on July 1, 2026, and consists of parts of the former districts Jung

It encompass Yeongjongdo and adjacent islands such as Muuido except Bukdo-myeon, Ongjin County, Incheon. The island is an exclave of Incheon Metropolitan City's Jung-gu district, It is accessed via two bridges, Yeongjong Bridge connecting to Seo-gu and Incheon Bridge connecting to Songdo. Many residents Yeongjong-Yongyu demanded that Yeongjong-Yongyu should be a district of Incheon and old downtown area of Jung District, Incheon should be merged with Dong District, Incheon. In 2022, Yeongjong-Yongyu's Korean national population exceeded 100 thousands and old downtown area of Jung and Dong Districts.

On August 31, 2022, Mayor of Incheon Yoo Jeong-bok proposed the district be created. The two mayors of the former districts affected by the change agreed with this proposal.

== Administrative Divisions ==
- Yeongjong-dong, Yeongjong 1-dong, and Yeongjong 2-dong (divided collectively into the legal dongs of Jungsan-dong, Unnam-dong, and Unbuk-dong)
- Unseo 1-dong and Unseo 2-dong (divided collectively into the legal dong of Unseo-dong)
- Yongyu-dong (divided in turn into the legal dongs of Eurwang-dong, Nambuk-dong, Deokgyo-dong, and Muui-dong)
