= Songwol-dong Fairy Tale Village =

Themed area in Incheon, South Korea

- Neighborhood
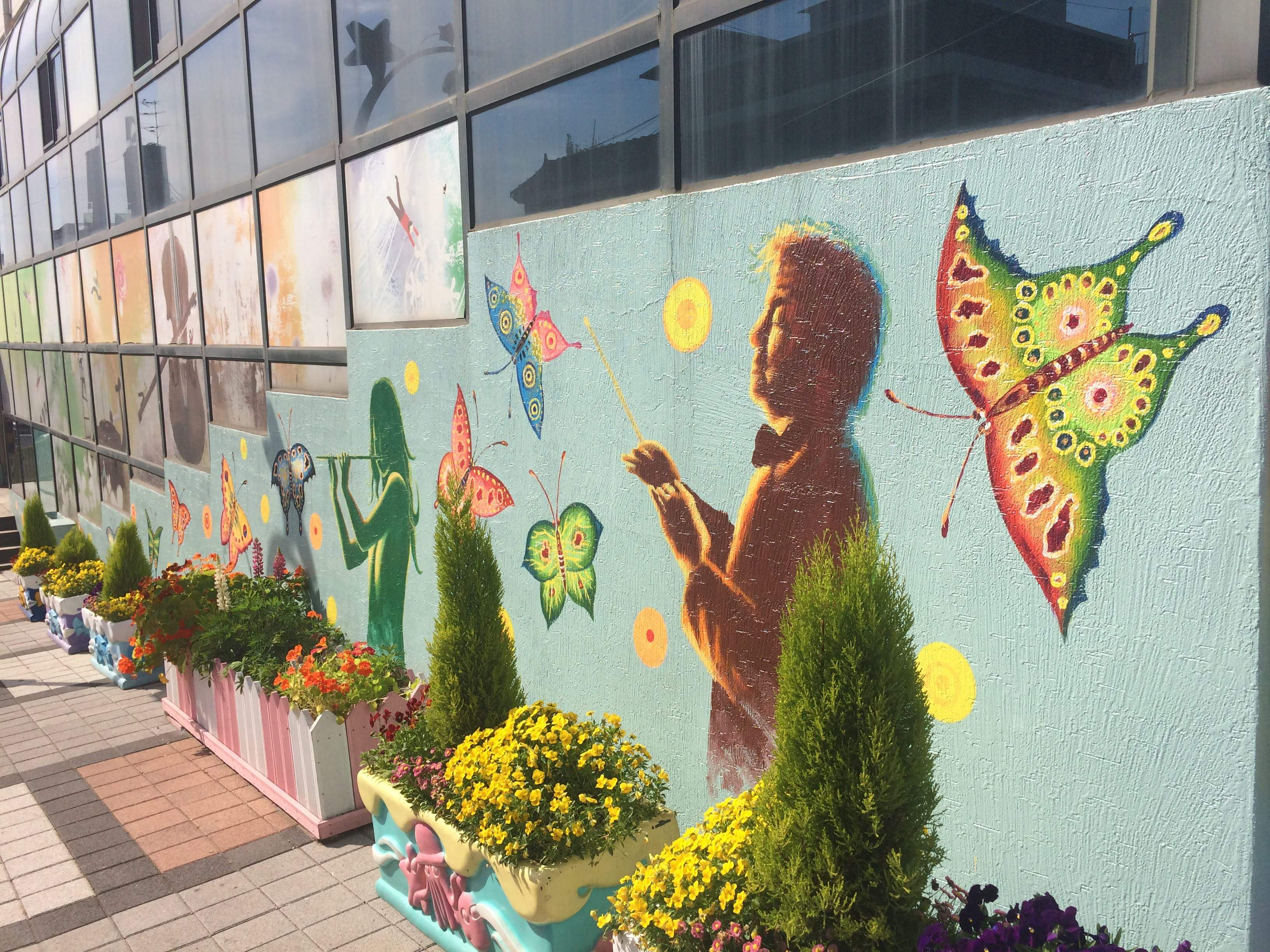
- Interactive map of Songwol-dong Fairy Tale Village
- Coordinates: 37.4777°N 126.6208°E
- Country: South Korea
- City: Incheon
- District: Jung District
- Dong: Songwol-dong

Population (2020)
  - Total: 4,600

Songwol-dong Fairy Tale Village (Korean: 송월동동화마을), or Songwol-dong Donghwa Village, is a themed area of Songwol-dong, Jung District, Incheon, South Korea.

== History ==
=== Background ===
Songwol-dong was called Solgol or Songsan because there were many pine trees, but now it is called Songwol-dong because of the beauty of the moon seen through the pine forest. After the opening of Incheon Port in 1883, foreigners such as Germans began to live there, forming a wealthy village. However, as young people left to settle and work in other regions like Seoul while elderly people lived in the village for decades, the village lost its vitality since 1970 and became stagnant, and empty houses were neglected.

=== Revitalization ===
In order to improve the poor residential environment, a flower road was made, and the walls were painted with the theme of world-famous fairy tales to transform it into a fairy tale village. The residential environment improvement project, which started in 2013, has completely transformed Songwol-dong into Donghwa Village over a period of about two years. A total of 11 themed roads were created, such as Dorothy Road, Little Red Riding Hood Road, and Traditional Fairy Tale Road. The village has become a tourist attraction that is constantly visited by tourists.

== Description ==
Most of the houses and buildings are decorated like a fairy tale village. For example, the gas meter of a house is the body of the Tin Woodman in "The Wizard of Oz" and the telephone pole is the beanstalk in "Jack and the Beanstalk". Unlike other mural villages, it is not flat but three-dimensional. Songwol-dong Fairy Tale Village is decorated by recycling the facilities that local residents usually use as much as possible. "Trick Art Story" features 2D art that looks 3D.

As of 2020, there are 4,600 residents, and most of them are in their 60s to 80s. After the revitalization project, some residents enjoyed watching visitors because the village used to be a quiet place. However, noise, garbage, and invasion of privacy caused by tourists became a problem.
