= Daebul Hotel =

First Western-style hotel in Korea

- 대불호텔
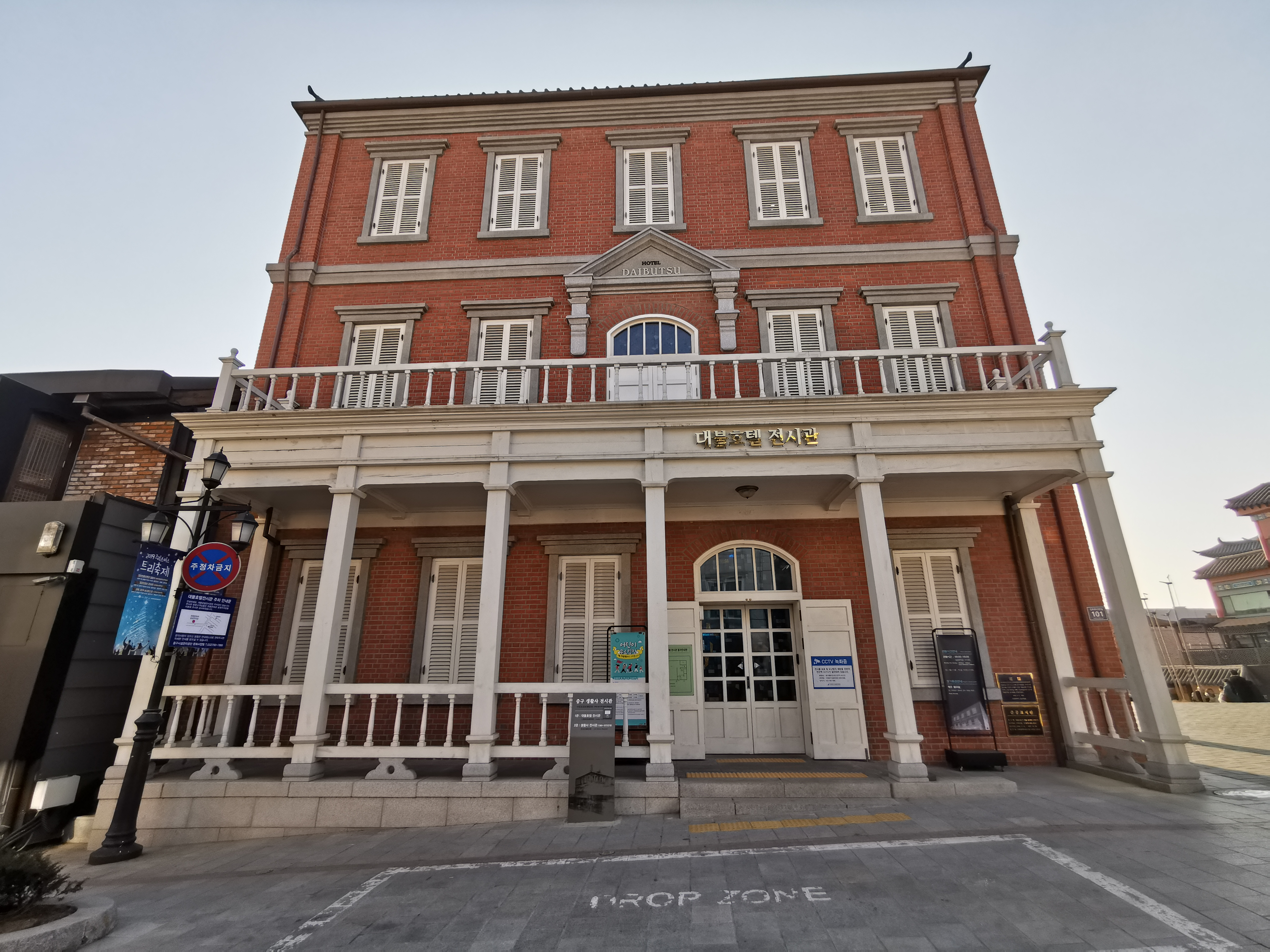
- The reconstructed building (2020)
- Interactive map of the Daebul Hotel area
- Alternative names: Daibutsu Hotel (Japanese: 大仏ホテル)

General information
- Location: 101 Sinpo-ro 23beon-gil, Jung-gu, Incheon, South Korea
- Coordinates: 37.4735°N 126.6199°E
- Completed: 1888; 2018 (reconstruction)
- Demolished: 1978

The Daebul Hotel (Korean: 대불호텔; Hanja: 大佛호텔), Japanese name Daibutsu Hotel (大仏ホテル), was a historic former hotel in Incheon, South Korea. Built in 1888, it was the first ever Western-style hotel to be established in Korea.

The building now operates as a museum. The first floor covers the history of the building, and the second the history of Jung District in the 1960s to 1970s.

== History ==
The hotel started as a two-story Japanese-style wooden building in 1884. Due to lack of facilities to accommodate foreigners, the building was rebuilt in 1888 and became a three-story Western style building. It was operated by Hori Hisataro (堀久太郞), a Japanese shipping agent. It was frequented by sailors in its early history.

Hotels in Incheon began to decline with the opening of the Gyeongin Line in 1899. Daebul Hotel closed around 1907. In 1918, Chinese people including Lai Shaojing (Chinese: 賴紹晶) took over the hotel and opened the Beijing cuisine restaurant Zhonghualou (Chinese: 中華樓). It remained in operation until early 1970 and was used as a rental house until it was demolished in 1978.

=== Reconstruction ===
In 2011, a private business rediscovered the remains of the building, and the Cultural Heritage Administration recommended that the building be preserved. The government moved to recreate the building as an exhibit. They were met with opposition from some civic groups calling it a "waste of budget" that restores cultural heritage without thorough historical research. Nevertheless, the reconstruction was completed in 2018.

== See also ==
- Sontag Hotel
