= Freedom Park, Bengaluru =

Public park

Coordinates: 12°58′38.18″N 77°34′54.64″E

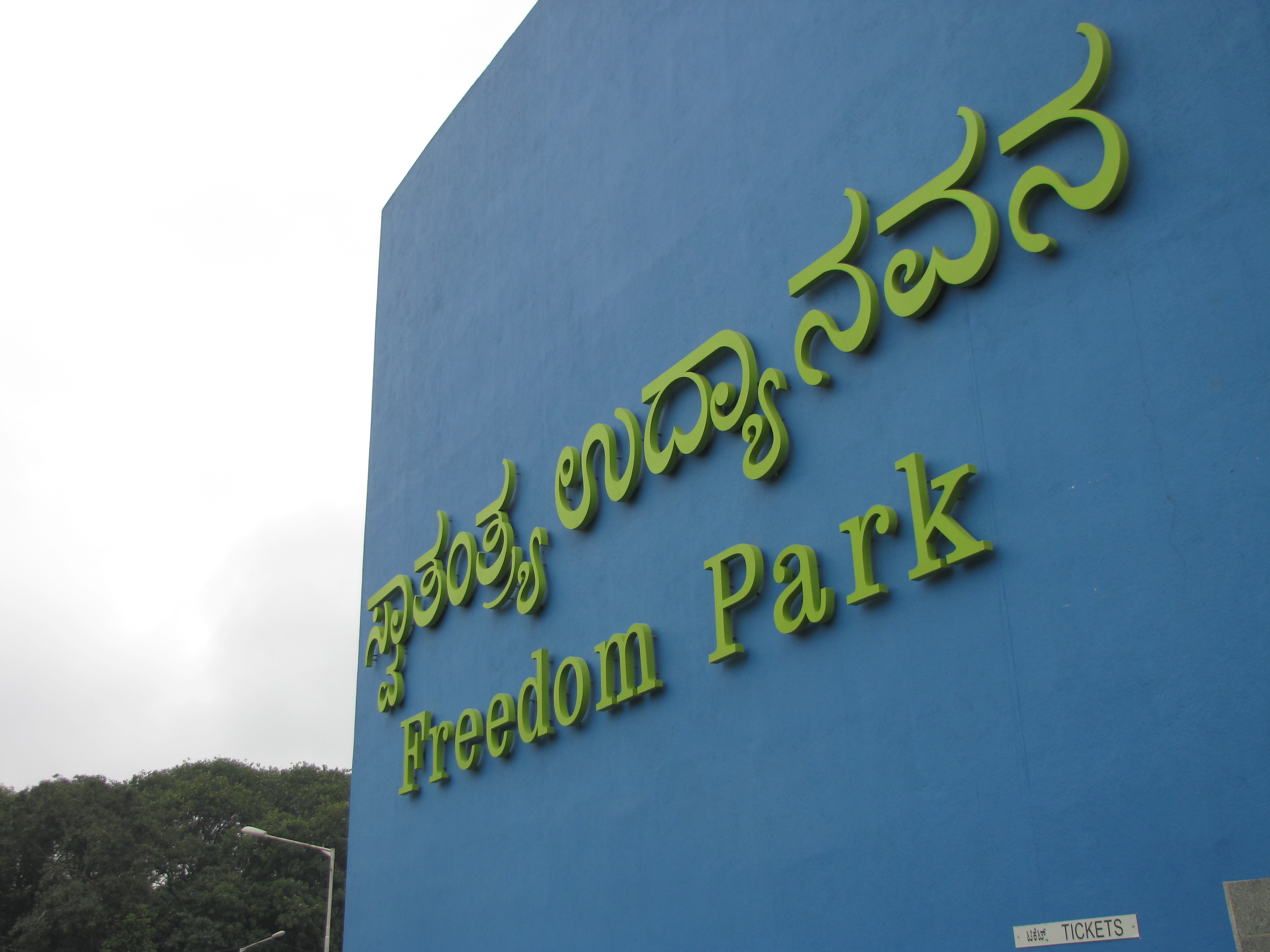
Entrance to Freedom Park

Freedom Park is located in the Central Business District of the city of Bengaluru, Karnataka, India. It was formerly the Central Jail.

It was opened to the public in November 2008. A part of it has been allotted for protests.

When a state of emergency was proclaimed in India in 1975, several opposition leaders including Atal Bihari Vajpayee and L.K. Advani were arrested and jailed at this prison.

It also hosted the India Against Corruption (IAC) supported Anna Hazare indefinite fast for governmental action in the enactment of the Lok Pal bill.

== Gallery ==
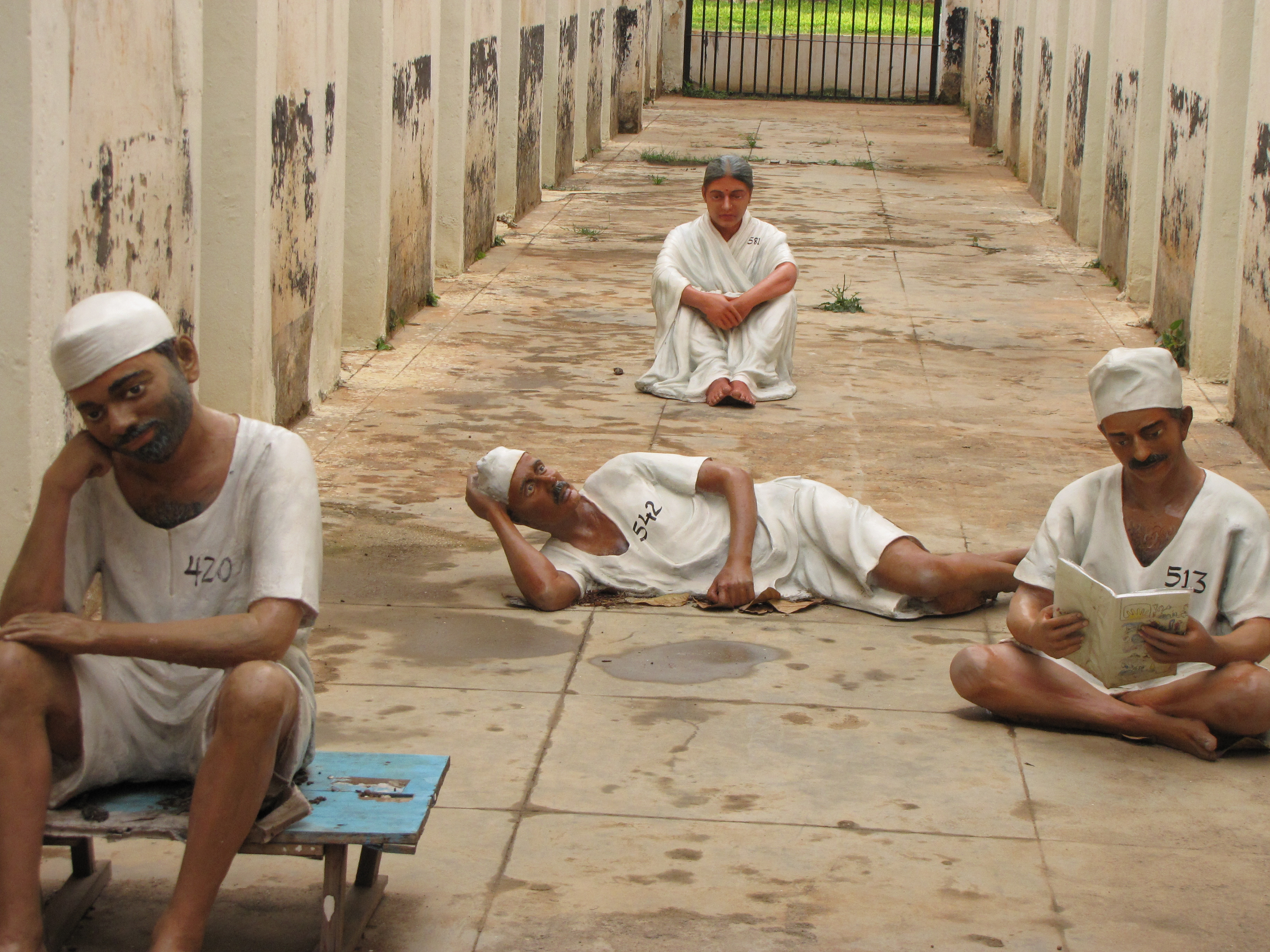
Sculptures of freedom fighters

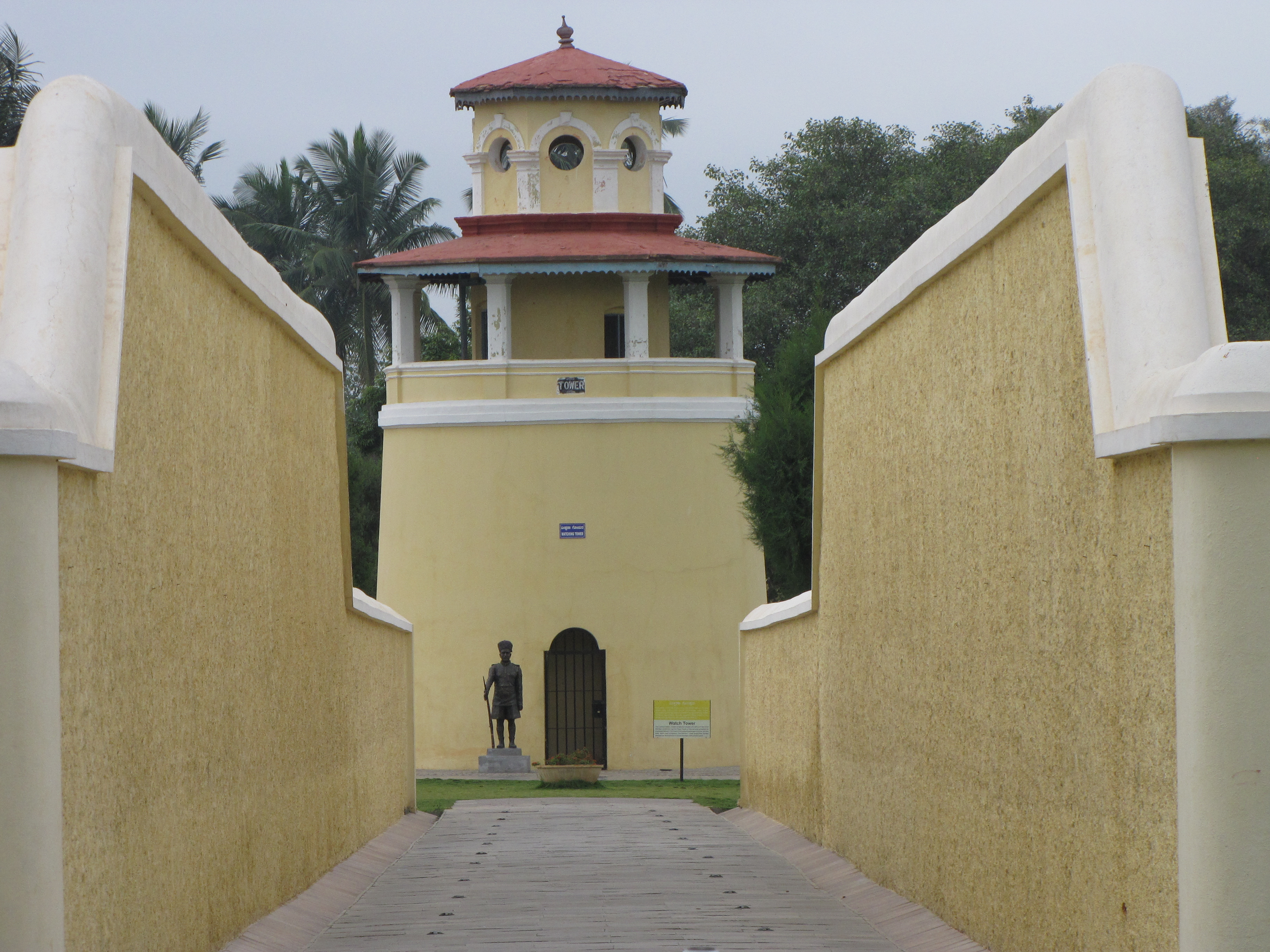
Central Tower, Freedom Park

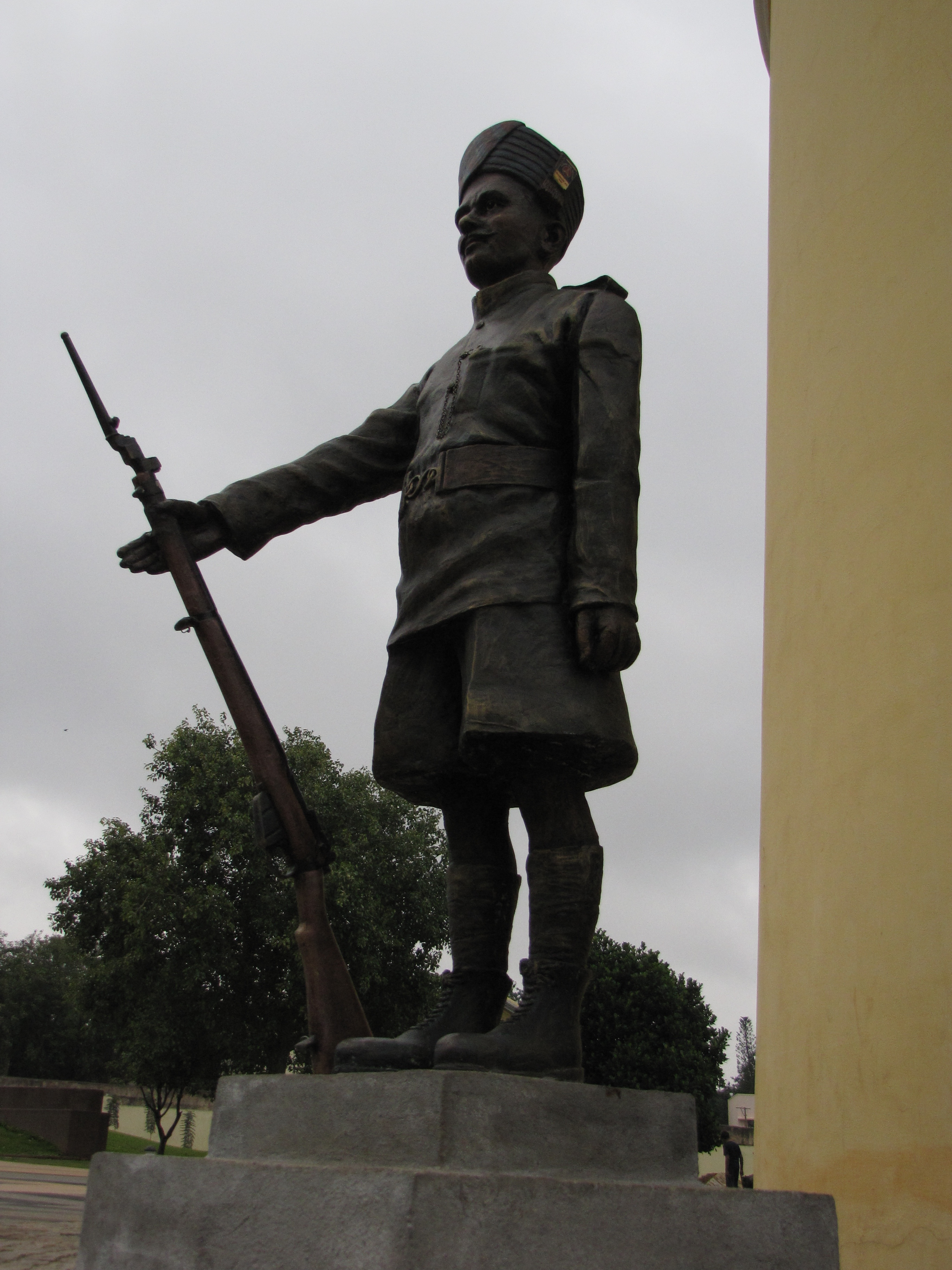
Sculpture of soldier

== See also ==
- Freedom Park
