= JEI University =

Coordinates: 37.47460°N 126.64988°E

- 인천재능대학교(仁川才能大學校)
- Type: Private
- Established: 1970
- President: Jin-Hyung KIM
- Location: Incheon, South Korea
- Mascots: Crane and Seal
- Website: Official website

Korean name
- Hangul: 인천재능대학교
- Hanja: 仁川才能大學校
- RR: Incheon jaeneung daehakgyo
- MR: Inch'ŏn chaenŭng taehakkyo

JEI University (Korean: 인천재능대학교) is a private college located in Dong District, Incheon, South Korea.

It was established in December 1970 as a professional school of Daehun Electronics College of Technology. In 1979, it was reorganized as Daehun College of Technology and changed its name to Daehun Junior College in 1993.

In February 1997, Park Sung-hoon, CEO of JEI Corporation took office as Chairman. In 1998, Daehun Junior College changed its name to JEI College and was renamed Incheon JEI University as of 2011.

== See also ==
- List of universities and colleges in South Korea
