= Freedom Park, North West =

Freedom Park
- Location within North West (South African province) Location within South Africa
- Coordinates: 25.569°S 27.251°E
- Country: South Africa
- Province: North West
- District: Bojanala Platinum
- Municipality: Rustenburg

Area
  - Total: 6.32 km^{2} (2.44 sq mi)

Population (2011)
  - Total: 23,156
  - Density: 3,660/km^{2} (9,490/sq mi)

Racial makeup (2011)
  - Black African: 98.6%
  - Coloured: 0.2%
  - Indian/Asian: 0.2%
  - White: 0.1%
  - Other: 1.0%

First languages (2011)
  - Tswana: 29.7%
  - Xhosa: 29.6%
  - Sotho: 19.0%
  - Tsonga: 9.3%
  - Other: 12.5%
- Time zone: UTC+2 (SAST)
- Postal code (street): 1811

Freedom Park is an informal housing settlement situated near the town of Rustenburg in North West Province, South Africa. It was established in the 1980s when poor people from other parts of South Africa were attracted by the possibility of employment at the nearby Impala Platinum mine. Today the settlement has a population of approximately 25,000 people. There is little public infrastructure at Freedom Park and residents lack adequate access to sanitation, electricity, and potable water.
