= Dong District, Incheon =

Former district of Incheon, South Korea

Coordinates: 37.47°N 126.64°E

Dong
- Autonomous District
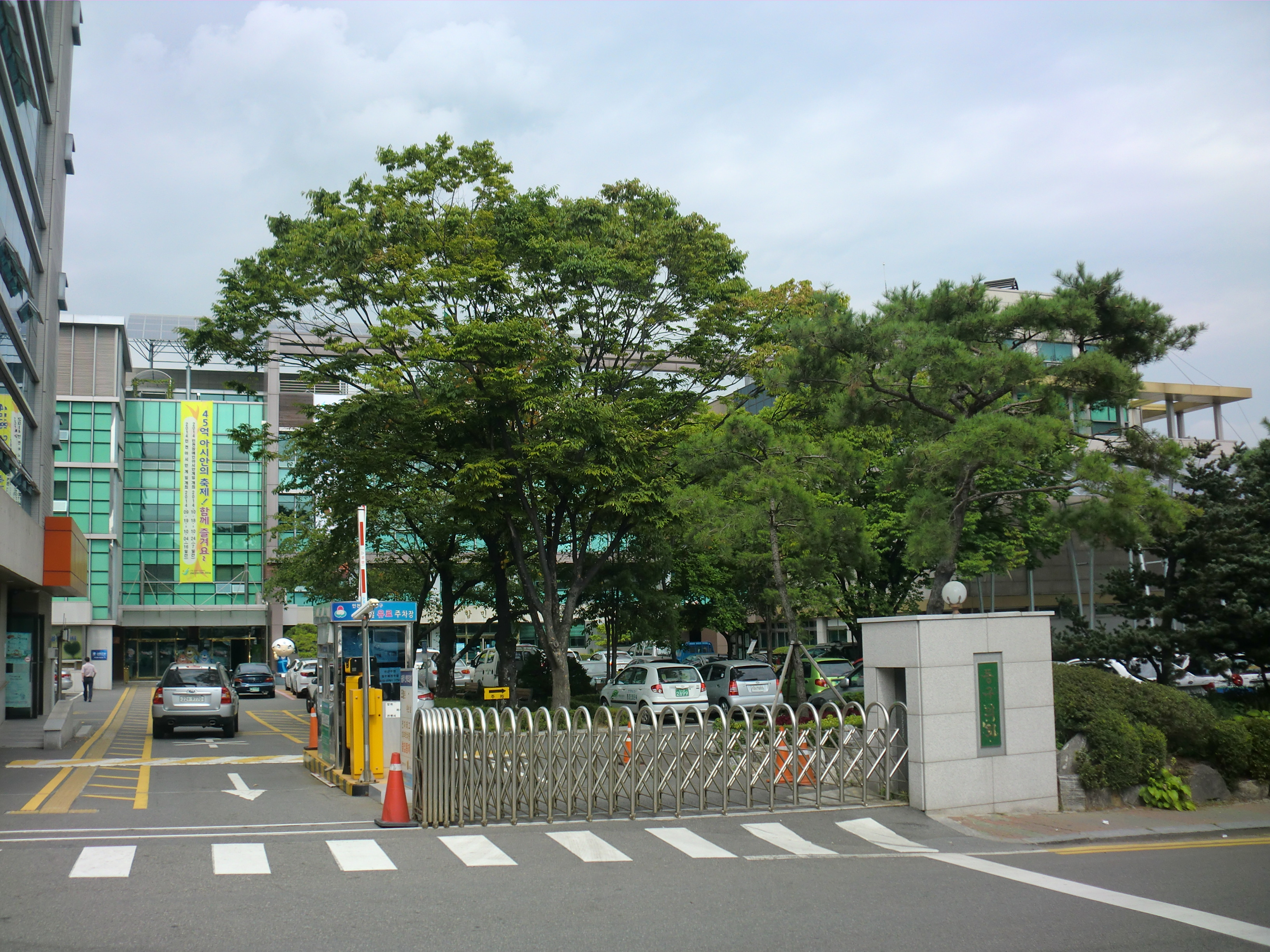
- Dong-gu district office in Incheon

- Flag

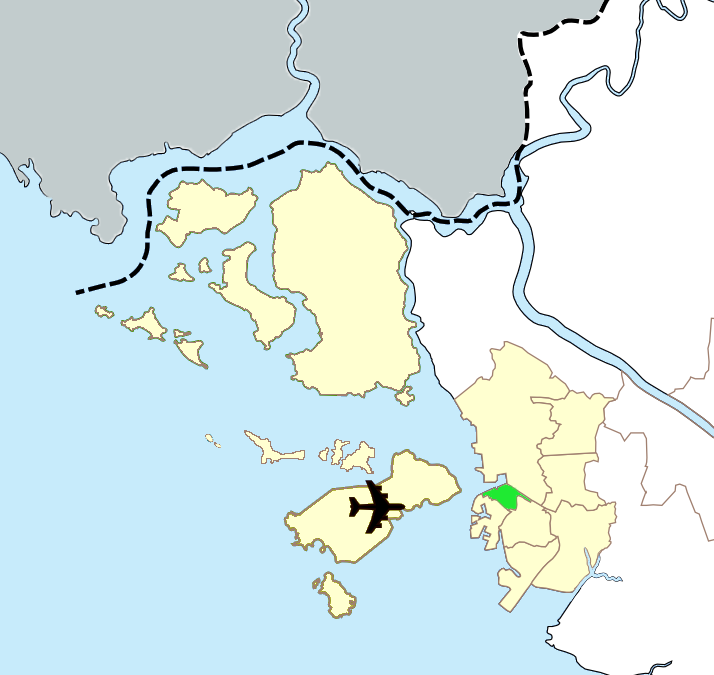
- Country: South Korea
- Region: Sudogwon
- Provincial level: Incheon
- Administrative divisions: 11 dongs

Area
  - Total: 7.20 km^{2} (2.78 sq mi)

Population (2022)
  - Total: 58,999
  - Density: 8,190/km^{2} (21,200/sq mi)
  - Dialect: Seoul
- Website: www.icdonggu.go.kr

Korean name
- Hangul: 동구
- Hanja: 東區
- RR: Dong-gu
- MR: Tong-gu

Dong District (Korean: 동구; Hanja: 東區) was a district of Incheon, South Korea. It existed as an autonomous district from 1968 until July 1, 2026, when it was dissolved as part of a reorganization of Incheon's administrative districts.

== History ==
Dong District was established on January 1, 1968, when Incheon introduced the autonomous district system. In the 1968 administrative reorganization, Incheon was divided into four districts: Jung, Dong, Nam, and Buk.

The district formed part of the historic urban core of Incheon. Incheon had four autonomous districts in 1968, and the number of administrative districts subsequently increased as the city expanded. In 1981, when Incheon was promoted to a directly governed city, it retained four districts and two branch offices; in 1995, following the incorporation of additional territory into Incheon Metropolitan City, the administrative system was expanded to eight districts and two counties.

By the 21st century, Dong District had become one of Incheon's older urban areas. Its industrial areas included concentrations of manufacturing businesses, particularly in Manseok-dong, Hwasu-dong, and surrounding areas.

The district experienced population decline and aging. According to a 2025 study by the Incheon Institute, the industrial areas of Manseok-dong and Hwasu-dong were characterized by aging infrastructure and a concentration of small manufacturing businesses, while manufacturing businesses and employment had declined over the long term.

On July 1, 2026, Dong District was dissolved as part of Incheon's administrative reorganization. Its territory was incorporated into the newly established Jemulpo District, together with the inland area of Jung District.

== Geography and population ==
Dong District covered 7.20 km^{2}. It was a relatively small urban district within Incheon and consisted primarily of established residential and industrial areas.

In 2022, Dong District had a registered population of 58,999 people in 27,618 households.

The population had declined over the preceding years. A 2025 study by the Incheon Institute identified population decline and aging as major characteristics of the district, alongside the decline and restructuring of its manufacturing sector.

The district's industrial economy included machinery, primary metals, and metal-processing industries. The Incheon Institute described Manseok-dong and Hwasu-dong as specialized manufacturing areas with relatively high manufacturing location quotients and with large anchor companies and associated small and medium-sized enterprises.

== Economy ==
Dong District had a significant manufacturing base. The former district government's business directory listed manufacturing companies operating in areas including Manseok-dong, Songhyeon-dong, and Songnim-dong, with products and activities ranging from metalworking and industrial machinery to shipbuilding and electrical equipment.

The industrial character of the district was particularly evident in Manseok-dong and Hwasu-dong, where older industrial facilities and small manufacturing enterprises were concentrated. The Incheon Institute identified the area as an industrial district requiring urban and industrial-space regeneration, while noting its continuing specialization in manufacturing.

== Administrative divisions ==
Administrative divisions

In 2023, Dong District consisted of 11 administrative dongs, 209 tongs, and 1,002 bans, and had a total area of 7.20 km^{2}.

The 11 administrative dongs were:

- Manseok-dong
- Hwasu 1-Hwapyeong-dong
- Hwasu 2-dong
- Songhyeon 1·2-dong
- Songhyeon 3-dong
- Songnim 1-dong
- Songnim 2-dong
- Songnim 3·5-dong
- Songnim 4-dong
- Songnim 6-dong
- Geumchang-dong

== Public facilities ==
The district had a number of public sports and community facilities. These included the Dong-gu District Sports Field in Songnim-dong, Manseok-dong sports facilities, the Songhyeon Reservoir inline skating facility, and the Dong-gu Culture and Sports Center.

The Dong-gu District Sports Field included a regulation-size football pitch, a 400-metre track, basketball and multi-purpose courts, and lighting facilities. The Dong-gu Culture and Sports Center included a swimming pool and fitness facilities.

== Education ==
- JEI University
