= St. Paul's Cathedral, Incheon =

Catholic cathedral in Incheon, South Korea

St. Paul's Cathedral
- 답동 주교좌 성당
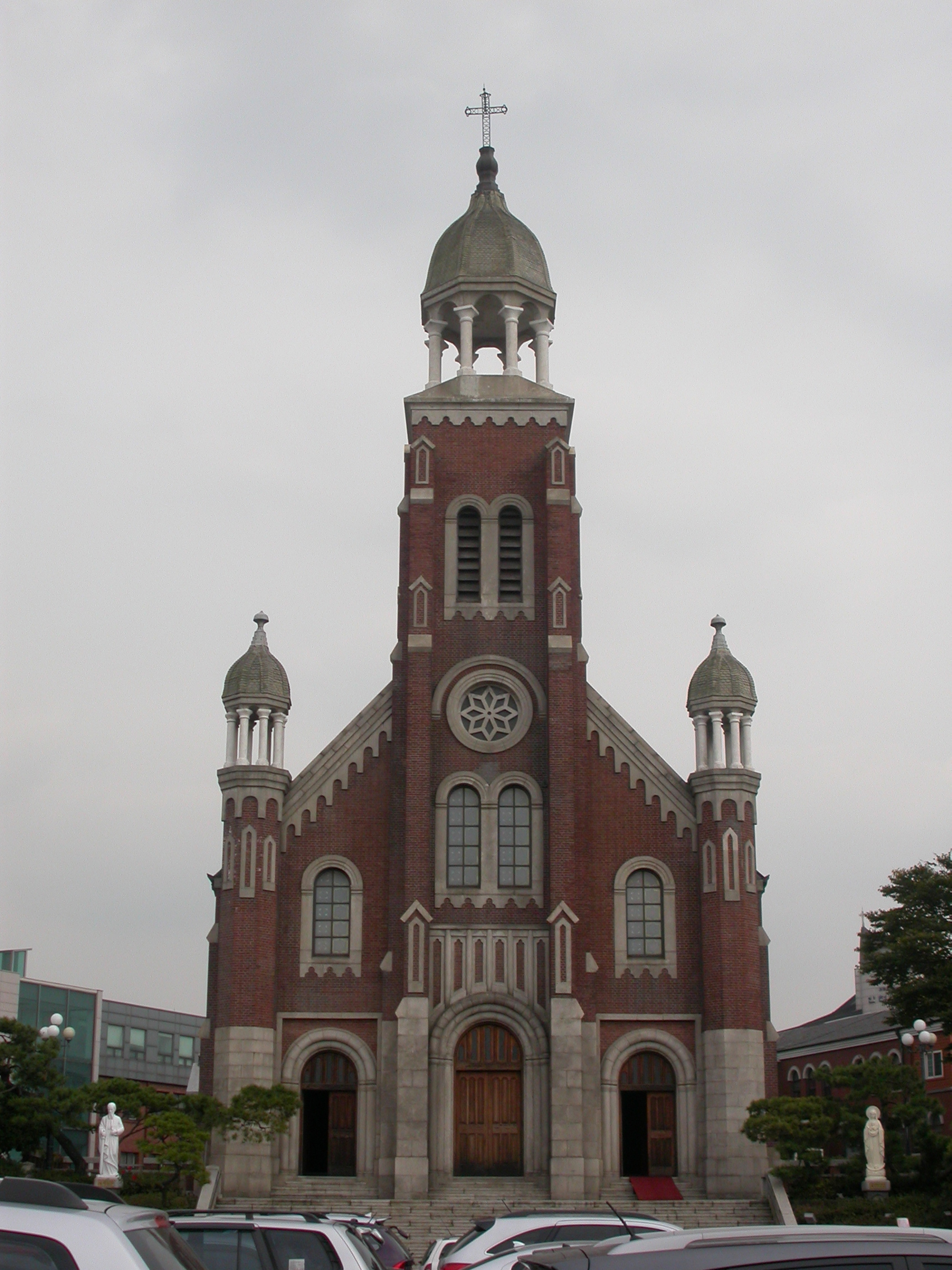
- St. Paul's Cathedral
- 37.4710°N 126.6305°E
- Location: Incheon
- Country: South Korea
- Denomination: Roman Catholic

Architecture
- Heritage designation: Historic Sites of South Korea
- Designated: 1981-09-25

St. Paul's Cathedral (Korean: 답동 주교좌 성당), also known as Incheon Cathedral and Dapdong Cathedral, is a Roman Catholic cathedral located in Incheon, South Korea's third largest city.

The church was designed by Fr. Eugene Cost (of the Paris Foreign Missions Society) in a mixture of styles, including Neo-Gothic and Neo-Romanesque.

The Latin rite church serves as the seat of the Diocese of Incheon (Dioecesis Inchonensis or 인천 교구) which was created in 1962 by Pope John XXIII.

== See also ==
- Roman Catholicism in South Korea
