= Jayu Park =

Park complex in Incheon, South Korea

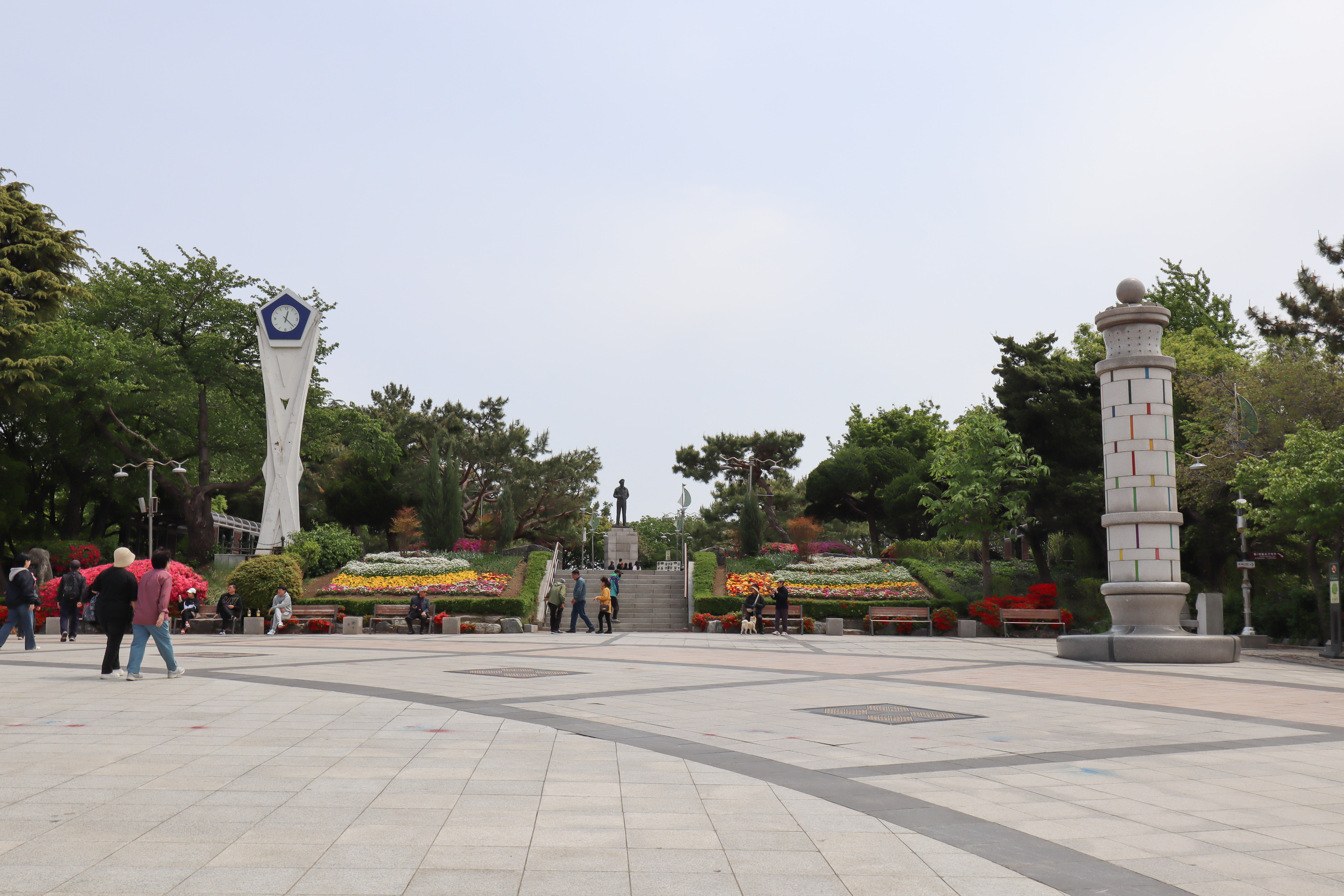
- Main square in the park (2023)
- Interactive map of Jayu Park
- Location: Incheon, South Korea
- Coordinates: 37°28′32″N 126°37′19″E
- Area: 68,555㎡
- Created: 1888
- Status: Open all year
- Parking: Available

Jayu Park (Korean: 자유공원; Hanja: 自由公園; RR: Jayu-gongwon), also known as Freedom Park, is an urban park located in Incheon, South Korea. Established in 1888, it is the first Western-style park of Korea.

== Description ==
The park is located on a hill overlooking the city's harbor. Prominently placed is a statue of general Douglas MacArthur. The park also houses a small zoo and a memorial to the Joseon–United States Treaty of 1882. The park is also renowned for its cherry blossom blooming season.

== History ==
Jayu Park reflects Korea's modern and contemporary history. In 1888, the park was managed by the Foreign Residents' Association, so citizens at that time called it Gakguk-gongwon. After 1914 when foreign settlements were abolished and the park management rights were transferred to Incheon, its name was changed to Seo-gongwon or Yamate Park. After the March First Movement in 1919, Hanseong Provisional Government was declared in the park.

After Korea's liberation in 1945, it was called Manguk-gongwon. More than half of the park was destroyed in the Korean War. After the statue of Douglas MacArthur who lead the Battle of Inchon was built in 1957, its name was changed to Jayugongwon.

== Incident ==
In 2005, a pro-North Korea group (우리민족연방제통일추진회의) protested for the removal of the MacArthur statue.

== Gallery ==
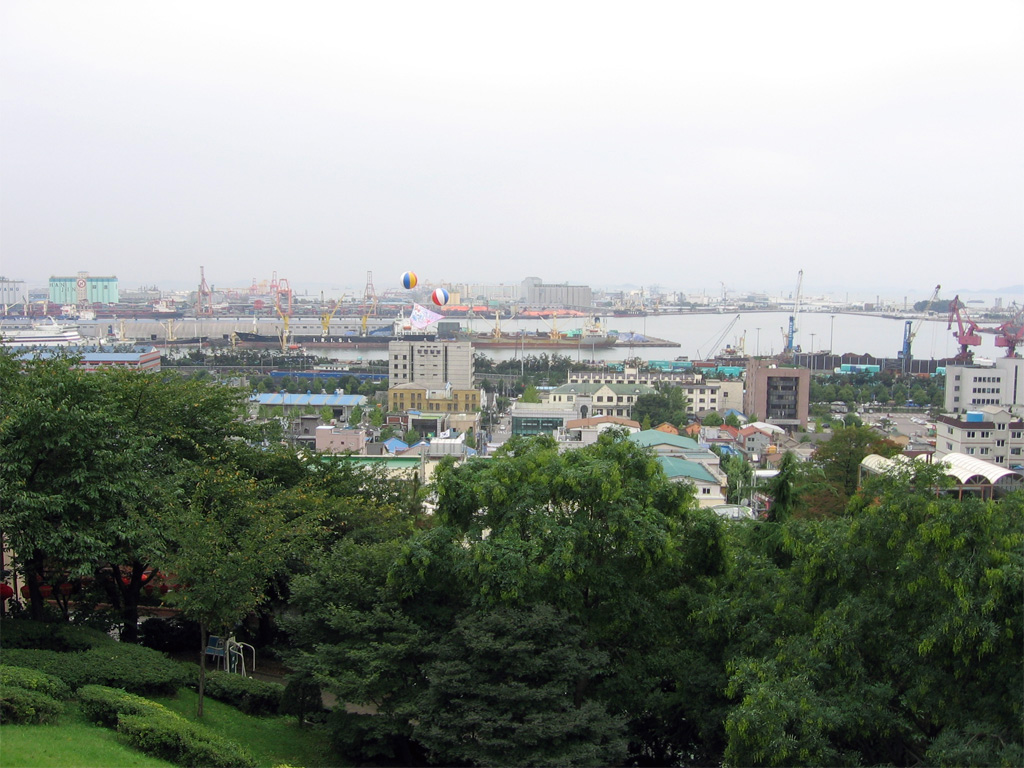
View of the port of Incheon from the park (2006)

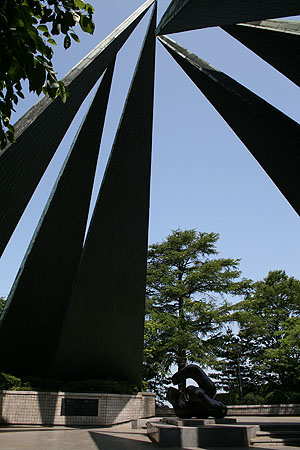
Korea-USA friendship monument (2007)

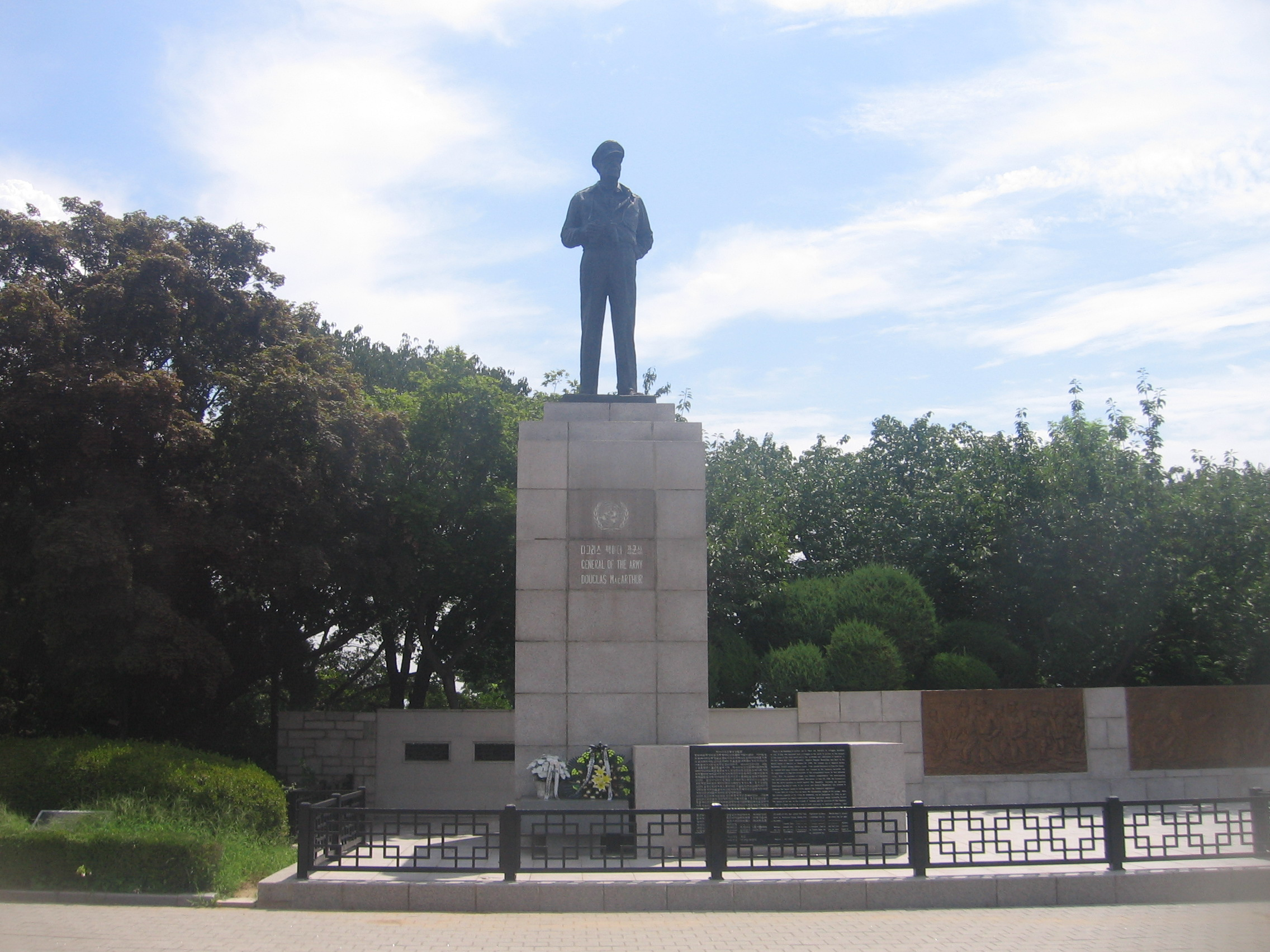
Statue of Douglas MacArthur (2025)
