= Jajangmyeon Museum =

Food museum in Jung, Incheon, South Korea

- 짜장면박물관
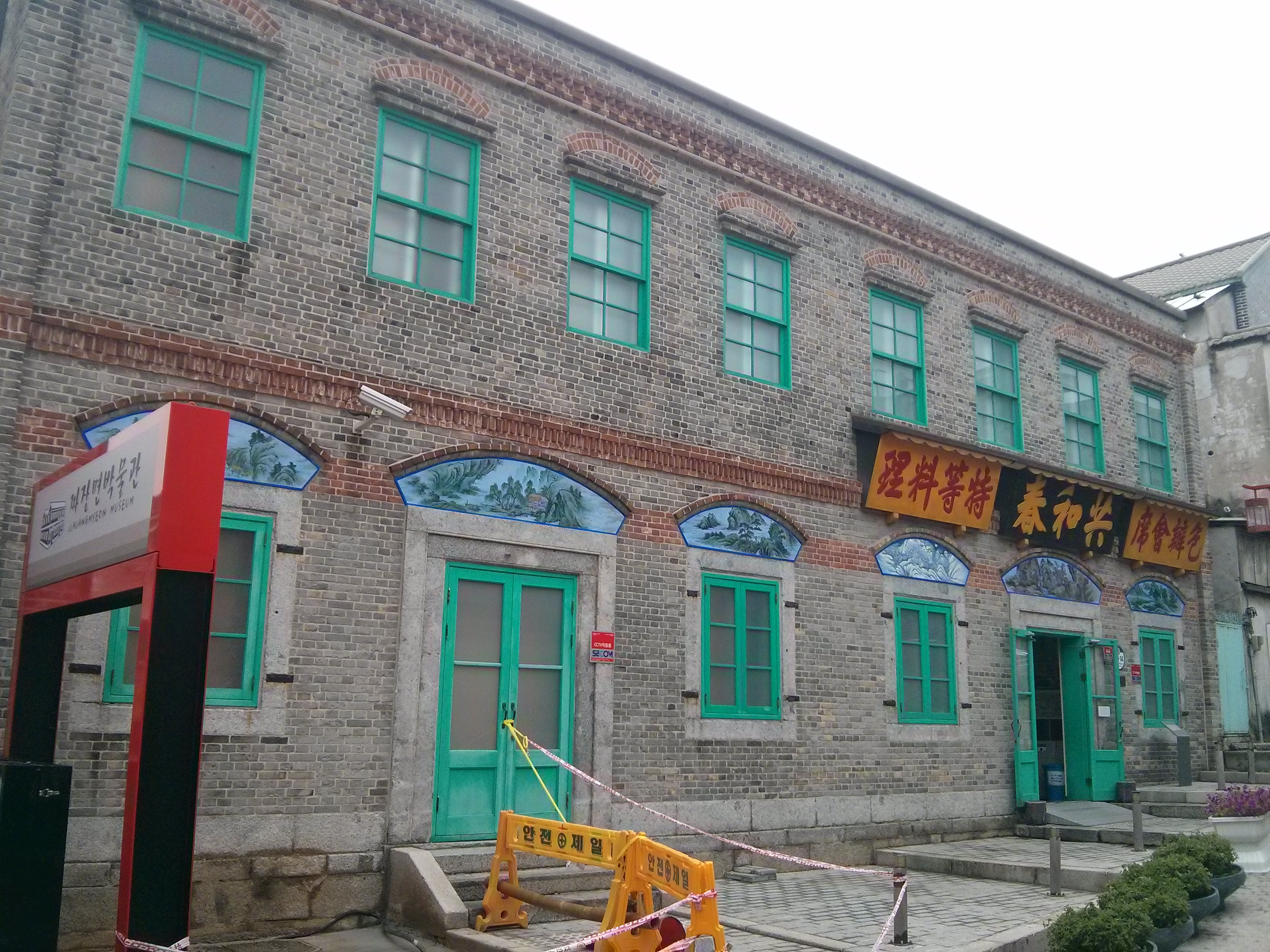
- Established: 28 April 2012
- Location: Jemulpo District, Incheon, South Korea
- Coordinates: 37°28′30″N 126°37′06″E
- Type: food museum
- Website: Official website (in Korean)

The Jajangmyeon Museum (Korean: 짜장면박물관) is a food museum in Jemulpo District, Incheon, South Korea. It focuses on the history of the Korean Chinese cuisine dish jajangmyeon.

== History ==
The museum is located inside the historic former restaurant Gonghwachun (Korean: 공화춘; Hanja: 共和春). The restaurant was founded in either 1905, 1907, or 1908 by Yú Xīguāng (Chinese: 于希光; Korean: 우희광), a Chinese person who came to Incheon from Shandong, China. The restaurant was originally founded under the name Shāndōng Huìguǎn (Chinese: 山東會館; Korean: 산동회관; RR: Shandonghoegwan). In either 1912 or 1913, it changed its name to Gonghwachun. The Chinese dish zhajiangmian, which was popular in Shandong, was served in the restaurant. Over time, this dish eventually became the Korean dish jajangmyeon.

The museum was opened on 28 April 2012.

== Architecture ==
The museum consist of six exhibition halls:

- History of Chinese Immigrants and Jajangmyeon
- The Beginning of Jajangmyeon
- Gonghwachun Guest Room of the 1930s
- The Jajangmyeon Boom Period
- Jajangmyeon, an Iconic Symbol of Today
- Gonghwachun Kitchen in the 1960s

== Transportation ==
The museum is accessible within walking distance southeast of Incheon Station of Seoul Metropolitan Subway.

== See also ==
- List of museums in South Korea
